= Batok (disambiguation) =

Batok may refer to:

- Batok, general terms for indigenous tattoos of the Philippines.
- Bukit Batok (disambiguation), Planning area and matured residential town in West Region of Singapore
- Mount Batok, cinder cone in East Java, Indonesia

== See also ==
- Batuk (disambiguation)
