= Bohra =

Bohra or Bora may refer to:

== Muslim sects ==
- Bohras, several groups in Tayyibi Isma'ilism
- Alavi Bohras, a Tayyibi Isma'ili community in Gujarat, India
- Dawoodi Bohra, a religious denomination within the Ismā'īlī branch of Shia Islam
- Sulaymani Bohras, a Tayyibi Isma'ili community in India
- Hebtiahs Bohra, a branch of the Mustaali community in India
- Sunni Bohra, of Gujarat, India

== People with the surname ==
- Achal Das Bohra (1918–2007), Indian engineer, academic, author, educator and philanthropist
- Ramkumar Bohra (1928–1991), Indian film producer, director, actor and screenwriter
- Karanvir Bohra (born 1982), Indian actor, producer and designer

== Other uses ==
- Bohra (mammal), an extinct marsupial
- Bohra, a fictional character in 2010 Indian film Enthiran

== See also ==
- Vora (disambiguation)
- Bohora, a Nepalese surname
- Vohra, a clan found amongst Sikhs and Hindus of the Punjabi Khatri community
