= Batuk =

Batuk may refer to:

- Batuk Vora, Indian journalist
- Birkan Batuk, Turkish basketball player
- Another spelling of Batuque (music), a music and dance genre from Cape Verde
- British Army Training Unit Kenya, a British Army training unit in Kenya
- Batuk, a musical collective consisting of Spoek Mathambo and others
- Batuk or batok, Visayan tattoos of the Philippines
- Batuk (food), a Nepalese fried lentil fritter
