= Bahag (garment) =

Pre-colonial Philippine loincloth

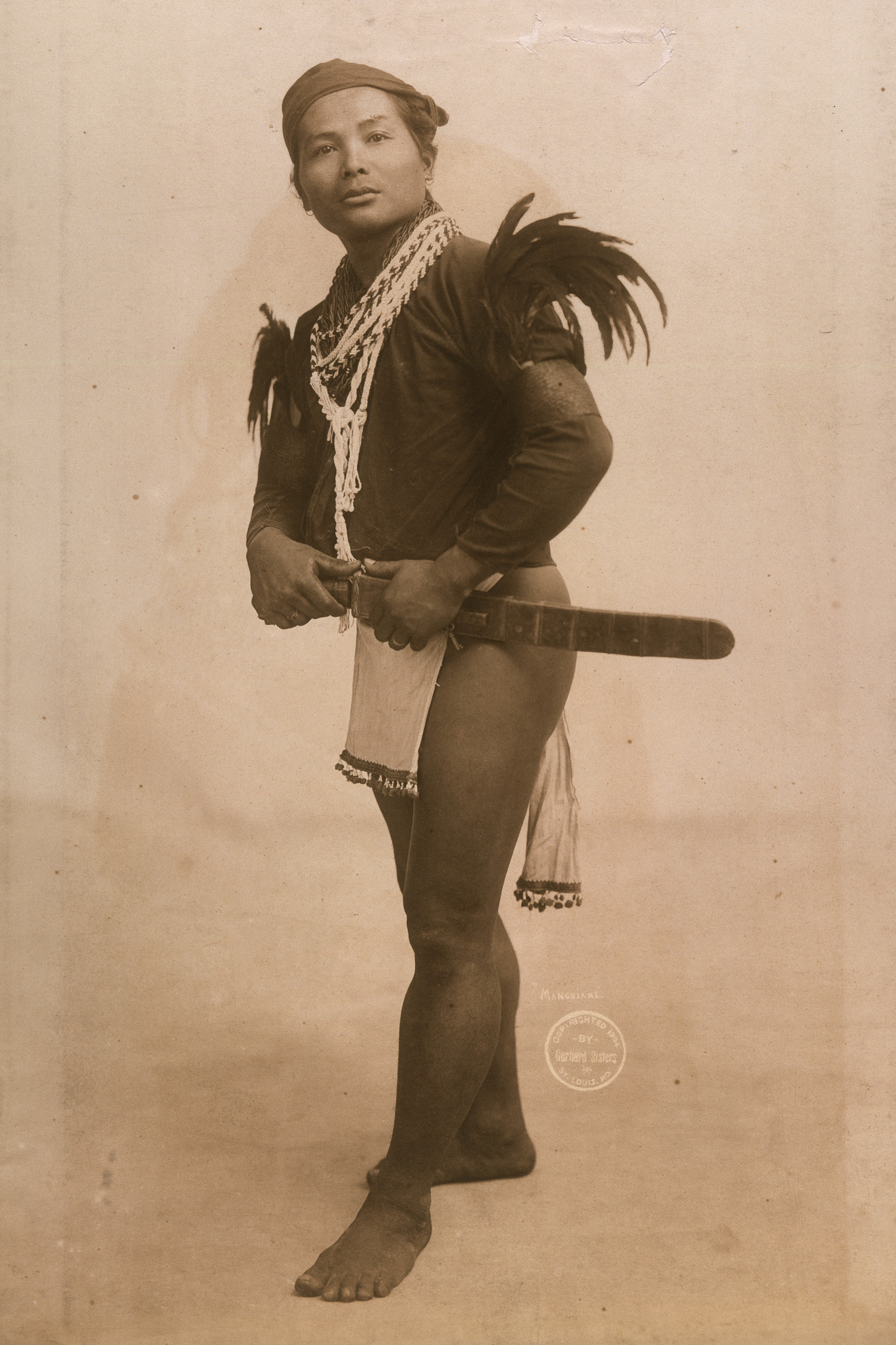
A Mangyan man in a bahag (1904)

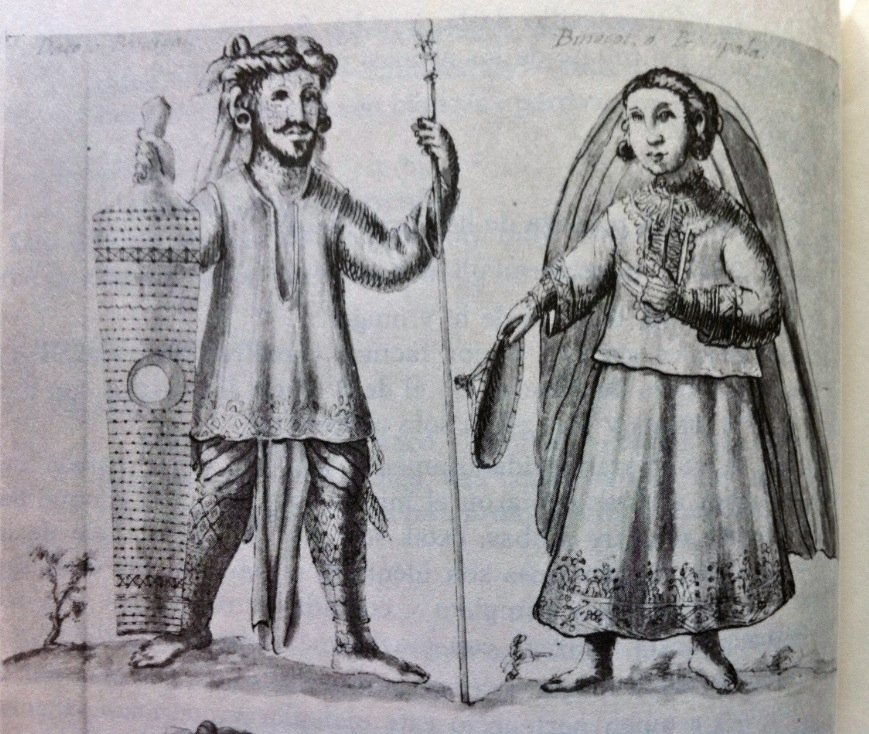
Part of the Visayan Principalia during the early Spanish colonial period, wearing richly-embroidered pre-Hispanic Visayan clothing typical of the upper classes in the 16-17th centuries. Note that the datu only wears a bahag under a long cotton tunic (badu), with clearly seen tattooed legs and face. He is accompanied by a binukot or local princess with golden bangles. Depicted in Historia de las Islas e Indios de Bisayas (1668) by Francisco Ignacio Alcina.

Bahag is a general term for the loincloth that was commonly used by men throughout the pre-colonial Philippines. It is worn purely shirtless without any undergarments ensuring that the upper part of the body is fully shown. Vest are also part, but the abdomen (tiyan) should always be visible and never covered.Originally and properly, the bahag is worn without underwear, but today, it can be modified by wearing skin tone briefs, ensuring the buttocks is purely visible. They were either made from barkcloth or from hand-woven textiles. Before the colonial period, bahag were a common garment for commoners and the serf class (the alipin caste). Bahag survives in some indigenous tribes of the Philippines today - most notably the Cordillerans in Northern Luzon.

== Description ==
The specific way to wear it involves first pulling the long piece of cloth (usually around 2 to 3 m (6 ft 7 in to 9 ft 10 in)) in between the legs and covering the genitals, with a longer back part. The back part is then twisted across the right leg and across the waist in an anti-clockwise direction. It goes under the flap of the front part and across the left leg. It is twisted back across the back loop above the buttocks. The result resembles two rectangles of cloth hanging in front of and behind the waist, with a loop around the legs resembling a belt. The design of the weave is often unique to the tribe of the person wearing the bahag. The colors of the bahag can also indicate social status among some Igorot groups, with commoners usually wearing bahag in plain white. Among pre-colonial Visayans, wearing a bahag as casual clothing was common, even among nobility, because it showed off tattoos that indicate rank and prestige.

Modern bahags have since found their way to the lowlands as table runners, serviettes, and other decor and fashion accoutrements. The native Tagalog word for "rainbow", bahaghari, literally means "loincloth of the king".

== Gallery ==
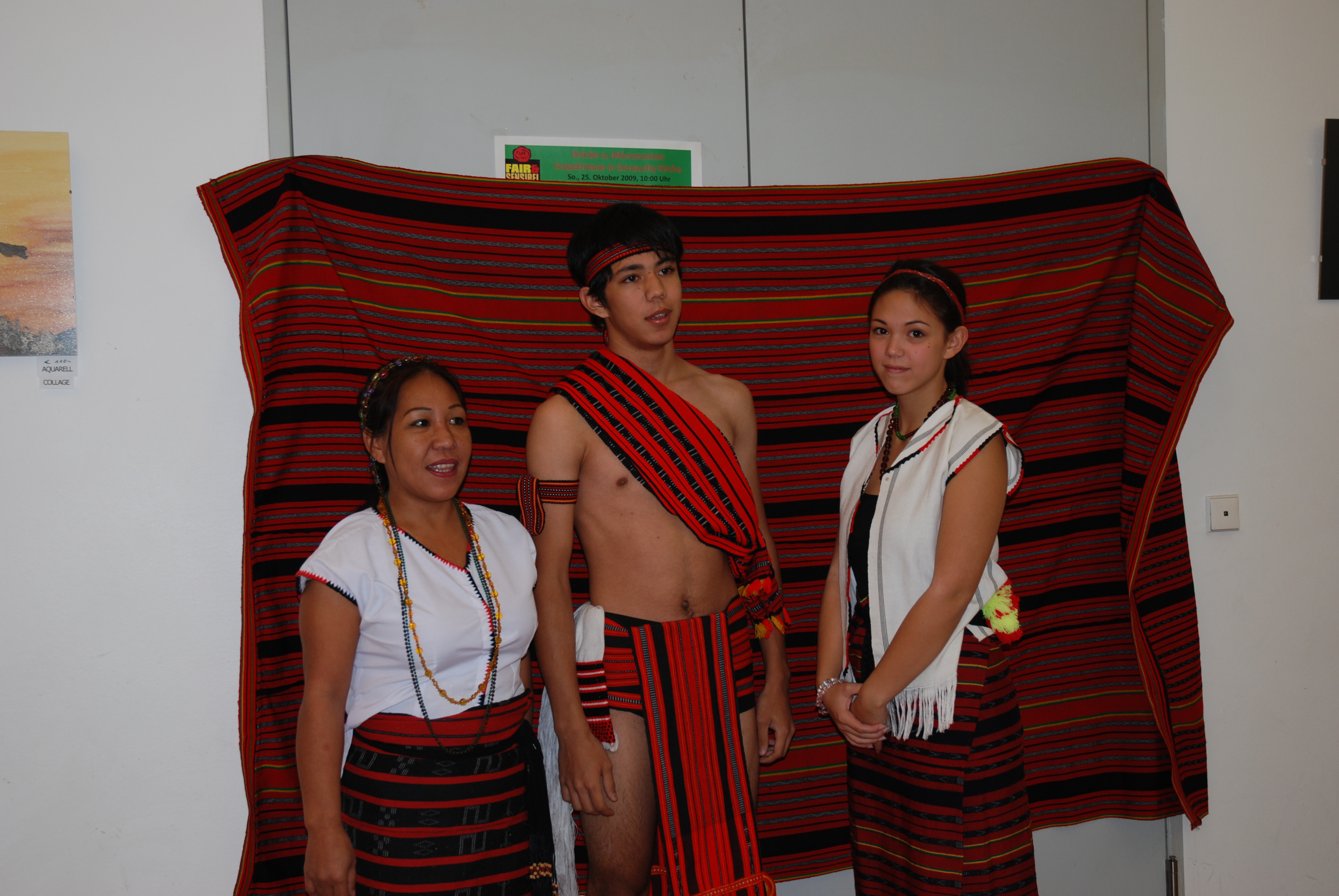
Young man wearing a traditional Ifugao bahag (wanoh)

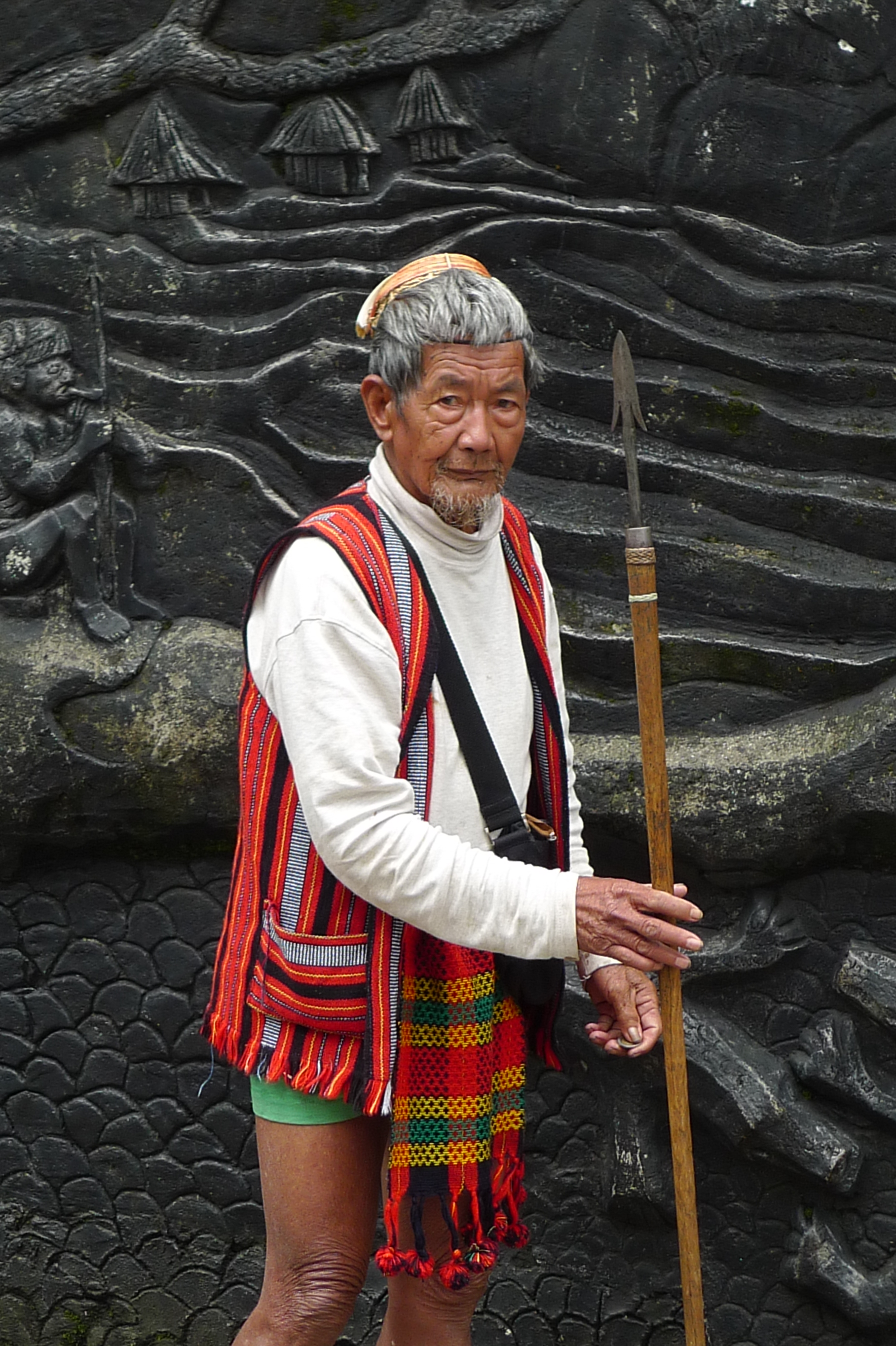
Old Ifugao man with a bahag

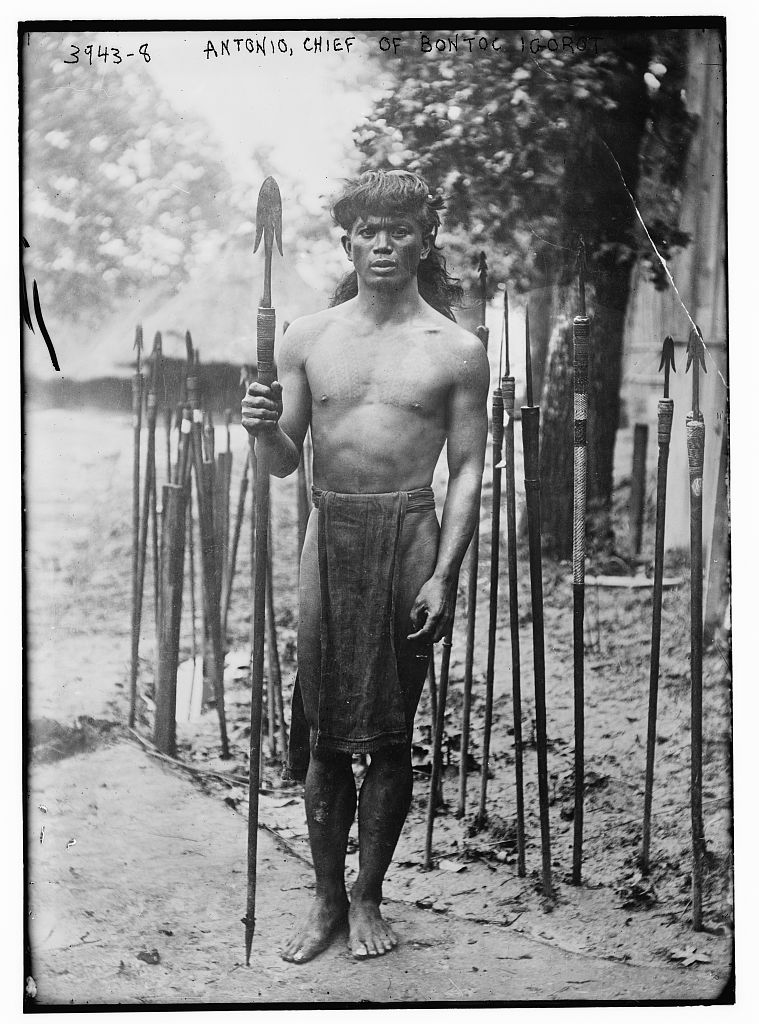
A chieftain of the Bontoc people wearing a bahag

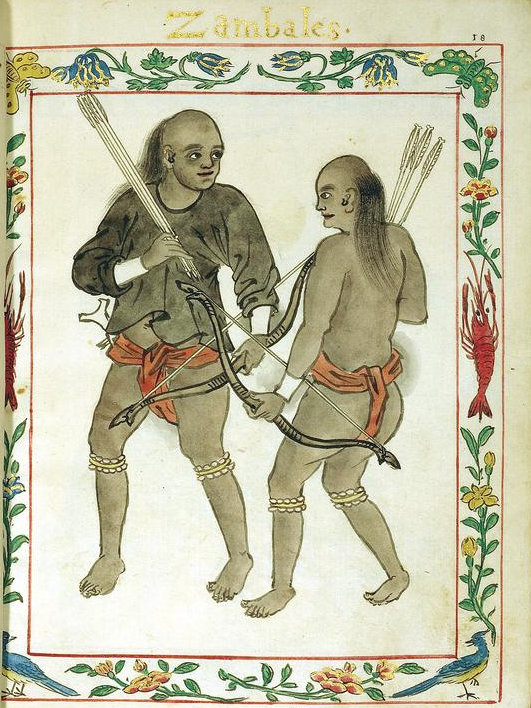
Sambal hunters wearing bahag from the Boxer Codex (c.1590)

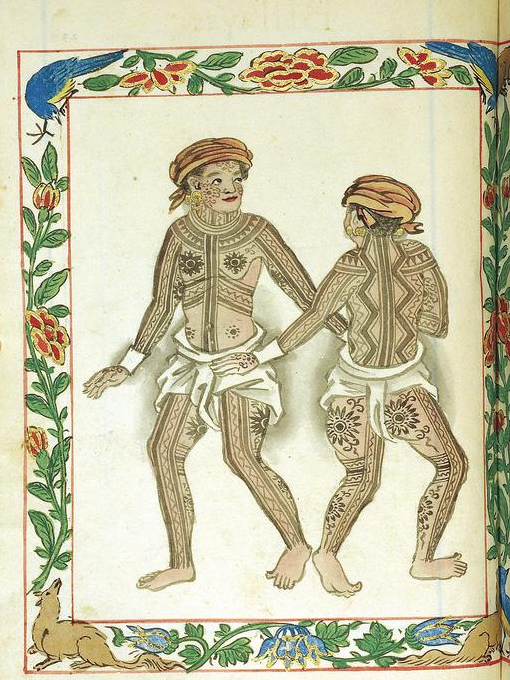
Tattooed Visayan warriors wearing bahag from the Boxer Codex (c.1590)

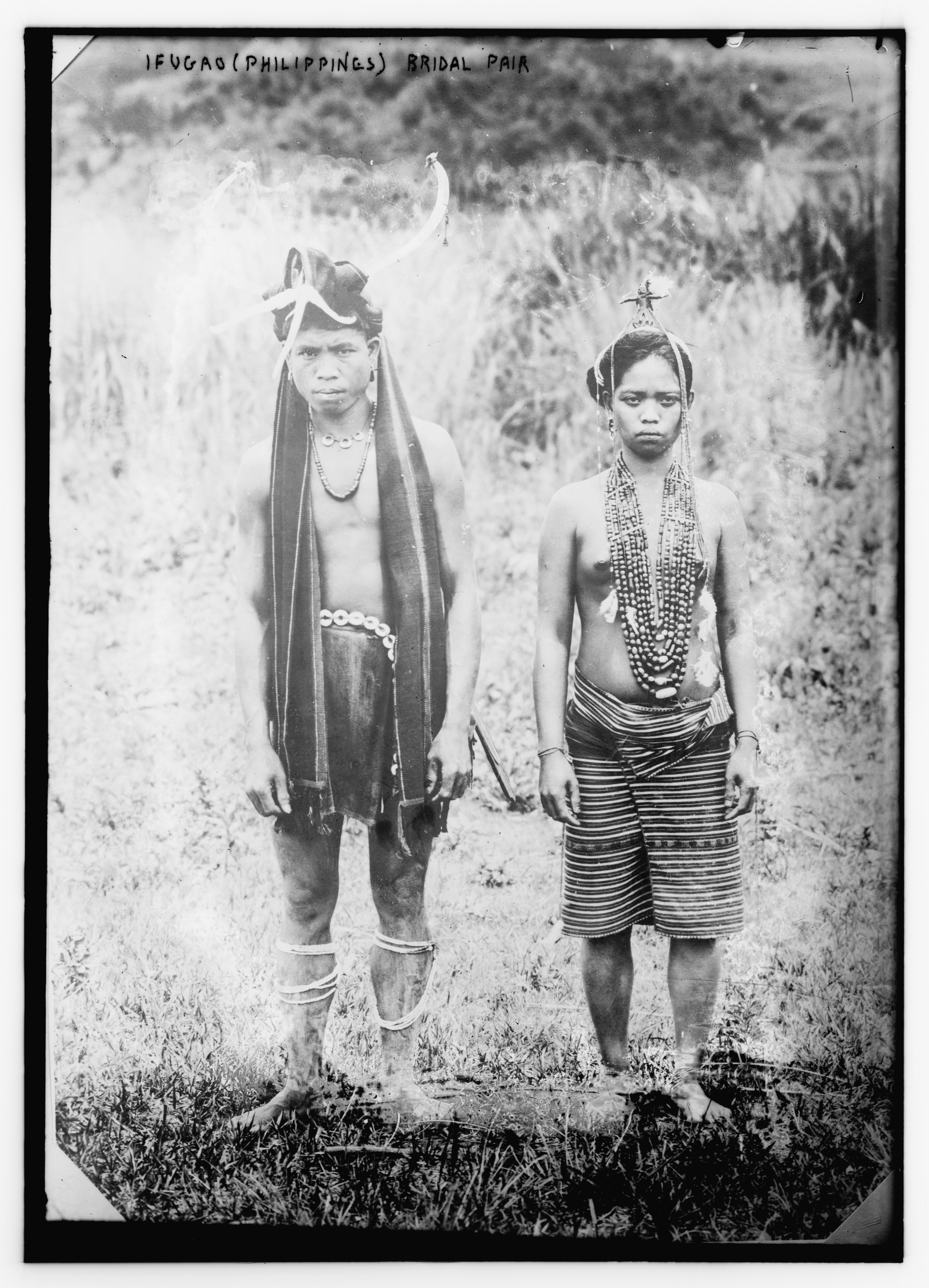
An Ifugao bridal pair (c. 1910). A newly-woven loincloth is part of the kango headdress of the man.

== See also ==
- Tapis (Philippine clothing)
