= Vohra =

Vohra is the name of a clan found amongst Sikhs and Hindus of the Punjabi Khatri community. The origin of the name is not known, but is thought to derive from the Sanskrit word vyūha meaning 'battle array'. It is also perhaps a Muslim surname from "bohora" meaning "merchant" in Urdu.

== Notables ==
- Arshad Vohra (born 1958), Pakistani politician
- Bhagwati Charan Vohra (1903–1930), Indian revolutionary
- Chandra Prakash Vohra, Indian geologist, glaciologist and mountaineer
- Chirag Vohra, Indian actor
- Darshan Singh Vohra, Indian Army officer, engineer and prosthetics pioneer
- Deepak Vohra (born 1951), Indian diplomat
- Hans Raj Vohra (1909–1985), Indian revolutionary, government witness and journalist
- Kaashish Vohra, Indian actress
- Karan Vohra, Indian actor
- Manan Vohra (born 1993), Indian cricketer
- Manpreet Vohra (born 1963), Indian diplomat
- Narinder Nath Vohra (born 1936), Governor of the Indian state of Jammu and Kashmir
- Paromita Vohra, Indian filmmaker and writer
- Raj Mohan Vohra (1932–2020), Indian general
- Reema Worah, Indian actress
- Rishi Vohra, Indian author
- Sankalp Vohra (born 1983), Indian cricketer
- Sheel Vohra (1936–2010), Indian cricketer, mathematician and teacher
- Sunny Leone (born 1981 as Karenjit Kaur Vohra), Canadian-born businesswoman and model
- Vineet Vohra (born 1973), Indian street photographer

== See also ==
- Vora (disambiguation)
- Sunni Vohra
