= Vora =

Vora may refer to:

== Places ==
- Vörå, a municipality in Finland
- Vorë or Vora, a town in Albania

== People ==
- Arun Vora, Indian politician
- Batuk Vora, Indian journalist
- Motilal Vora, Indian politician
- Neeraj Vora, Indian film director
- Ramanlal Vora, Indian politician
- Virji Vora, Indian merchant

== See also ==
- Bohra (disambiguation)
