= Batok =

Indigenous tattoos of the Philippines

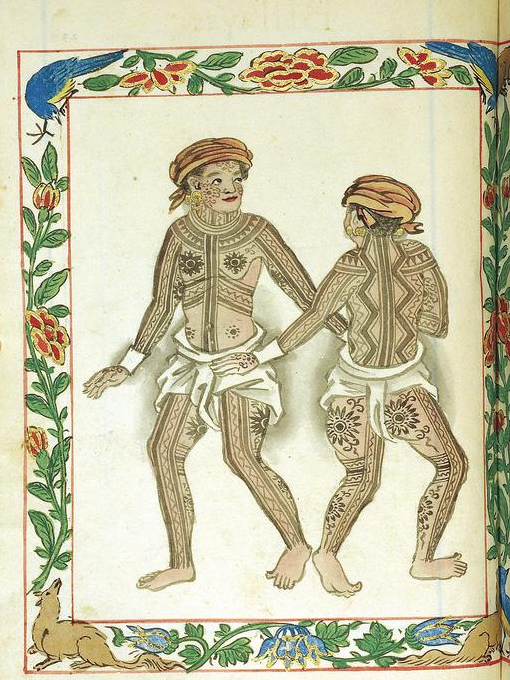
Spanish depiction of the tattoos of the Visayan Pintados ("the painted ones") of the Philippines in the Boxer Codex (c. 1590), one of the earliest depictions of native Austronesian tattoos by European explorers

Batok, batek, patik, batik, or buri, among other names, are general terms for indigenous tattoos of the Philippines. Tattooing on both sexes was practiced by almost all ethnic groups of the Philippine Islands during the pre-colonial era. Like other Austronesian groups, these tattoos were made traditionally with hafted tools tapped with a length of wood (called the "mallet"). Each ethnic group had specific terms and designs for tattoos, which are also often the same designs used in other art forms and decorations such as pottery and weaving. Tattoos range from being restricted only to certain parts of the body to covering the entire body. Tattoos were symbols of tribal identity and kinship, as well as bravery, beauty, and social or wealth status.

Tattooing traditions were mostly lost as Filipinos were converted to Christianity during the Spanish colonial era. Tattooing was also lost in some groups (like the Tagalog and the Moro people) shortly before the colonial period due to their (then recent) conversion to Islam. It survived until around the 19th to the mid-20th centuries in more remote areas of the Philippines, but also fell out of practice due to modernization and western influence. Today, it is a highly endangered tradition and only survives among some members of the Cordilleran peoples of the Luzon highlands, some Lumad people of the Mindanao highlands, and the Sulodnon people of the Panay highlands.

== Etymology ==
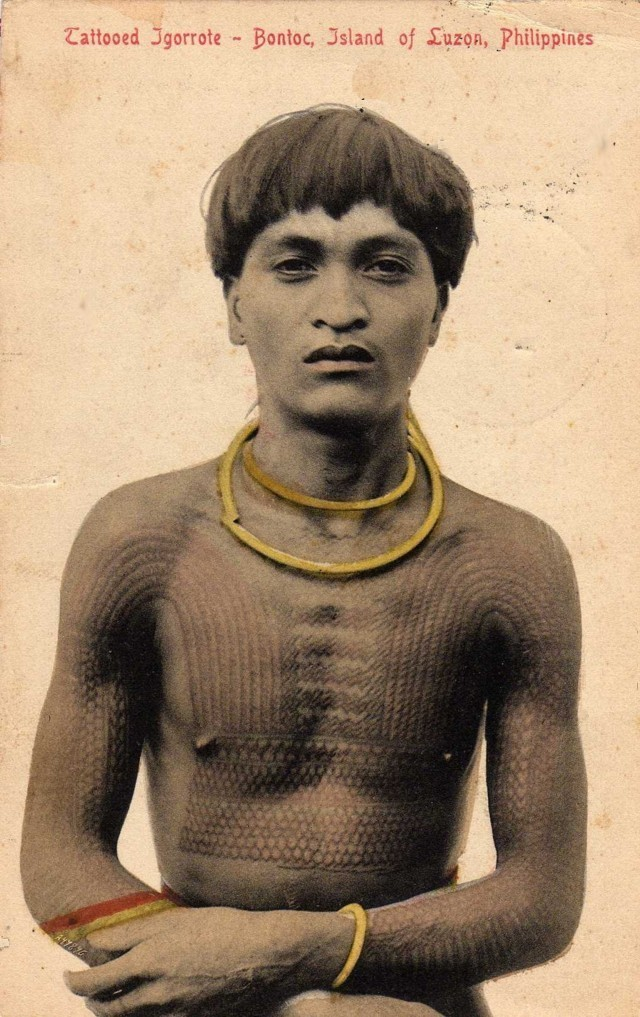
A 1908 photo of a Bontoc warrior bearing a headhunter's chaklag chest tattoo

Most names for tattoos in the different languages of the Philippines are derived from Proto-Austronesian *beCik ("tattoo"), *patik ("mottled pattern"), and *burik ("speckled").

== Description ==
Tattoos are known as batok (or batuk) or patik among the Visayan people; batik, buri, or tatak among the Tagalog people; buri among the Pangasinan, Kapampangan, and Bicolano people; batek, butak, or burik among the Ilocano people; batek, batok, batak, fatek, whatok (also spelled fatok), or buri among the various Cordilleran peoples; and pangotoeb (also spelled pa-ngo-túb, pengeteb, or pengetev) among the various Manobo peoples. These terms were also applied to identical designs used in woven textiles, pottery, and decorations for shields, tool and weapon handles, musical instruments, and others. Affixed forms of these words were used to describe tattooed people, often as a synonym for "renowned/skilled person"; like Tagalog batikan, Visayan binatakan, and Ilocano burikan.

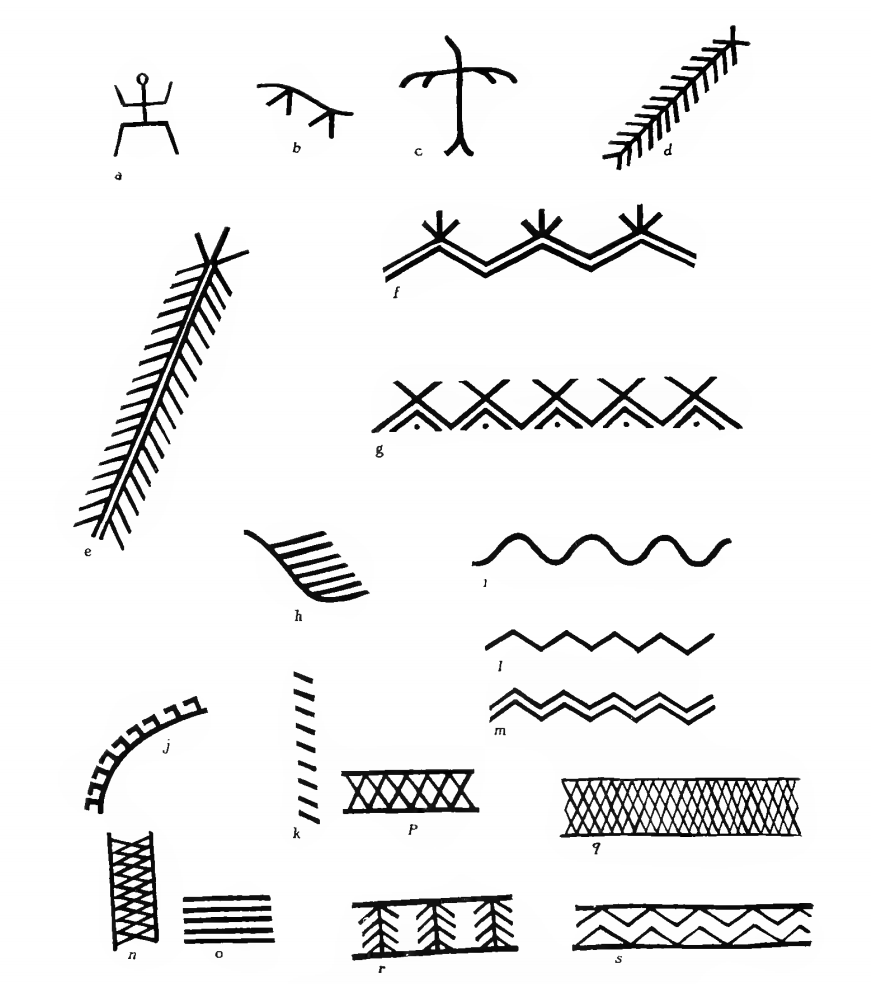
Ifugao tattoos depicting humans, dogs, birds, centipedes, and ferns, among others (1929)

They were commonly repeating geometric designs (lines, zigzags, chevrons, checkered patterns, repeating shapes); stylized representations of animals (like snakes, lizards, eagles, dogs, deer, frogs, or giant centipedes), plants (like grass, ferns, or flowers), or humans; lightning, mountains, water, stars, or the sun. Each motif had a name, and usually a story or significance behind it, though most of them have been lost to time. They were the same patterns and motifs used in other artforms and decorations of the particular ethnic groups they belong to. Tattoos were, in fact, regarded as a type of clothing in itself, and men would commonly wear only loincloths (bahag) to show them off.

"The principal clothing of the Cebuanos and all the Visayans is the tattooing of which we have already spoken, with which a naked man appears to be dressed in a kind of handsome armor engraved with very fine work, a dress so esteemed by them they take it for their proudest attire, covering their bodies neither more nor less than a Christ crucified, so that although for solemn occasions they have the marlotas (robes) we mentioned, their dress at home and in their barrio is their tattoos and a bahag, as they call that cloth they wrap around their waist, which is the sort the ancient actors and gladiators used in Rome for decency's sake."

— Pedro Chirino, Relación de las Islas Filipinas (1604),

Tattoos were symbols of tribal identity and kinship, as well as bravery, beauty, and social or wealth status. Most tattoos for men were for important achievements like success in warfare and headhunting, while tattoos in women were primarily enhancements to beauty. They were also believed to have magical or apotropaic abilities (especially for animal designs), and can also document personal or communal history. The pain that recipients must endure for their tattoos also served as a rite of passage. It is said, that once a person can endure the pain of tattooing, they can endure pain encountered later on in life, thus symbolically transitioning into adulthood. Tattoos are also commonly believed to survive into the afterlife, unlike material possessions. In some cultures, they are believed to illuminate the path to the spirit world, or serve as a way for ancestor spirits to gauge the worthiness of a soul to live with them.

Their design and placement varied by ethnic group, affiliation, status, and gender. They ranged from almost completely covering the body, including tattoos on the face meant to evoke frightening masks among the elite warriors of the Visayans; to being restricted only to certain areas of the body like Manobo tattoos which were only done on the forearms, lower abdomen, back, breasts, and ankles.

=== Process ===
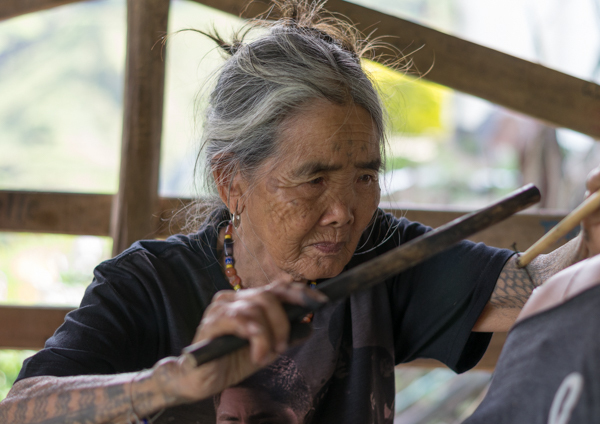
Apo Whang-od applying traditional Kalinga tattoos (batok) using the characteristic Austronesian tattooing tools - the hafted needle and the mallet

Tattoos were made by skilled artists using the distinctively Austronesian hafted tattooing technique. This involves using a small hammer to tap the tattooing needle (either a single needle or a brush-like bundle of needles) set perpendicular to a wooden handle in an L-shape (hence "hafted"). This handle makes the needle more stable and easier to position. The tapping moves the needle in and out of the skin rapidly (around 90 to 120 taps a minute). The needles were usually made from wood, horn, bone, ivory, metal, bamboo, or citrus thorns. The needles created wounds on the skin that were then rubbed with the ink made from soot or ashes mixed with water, oil, plant extracts (like sugarcane juice), or even pig bile.

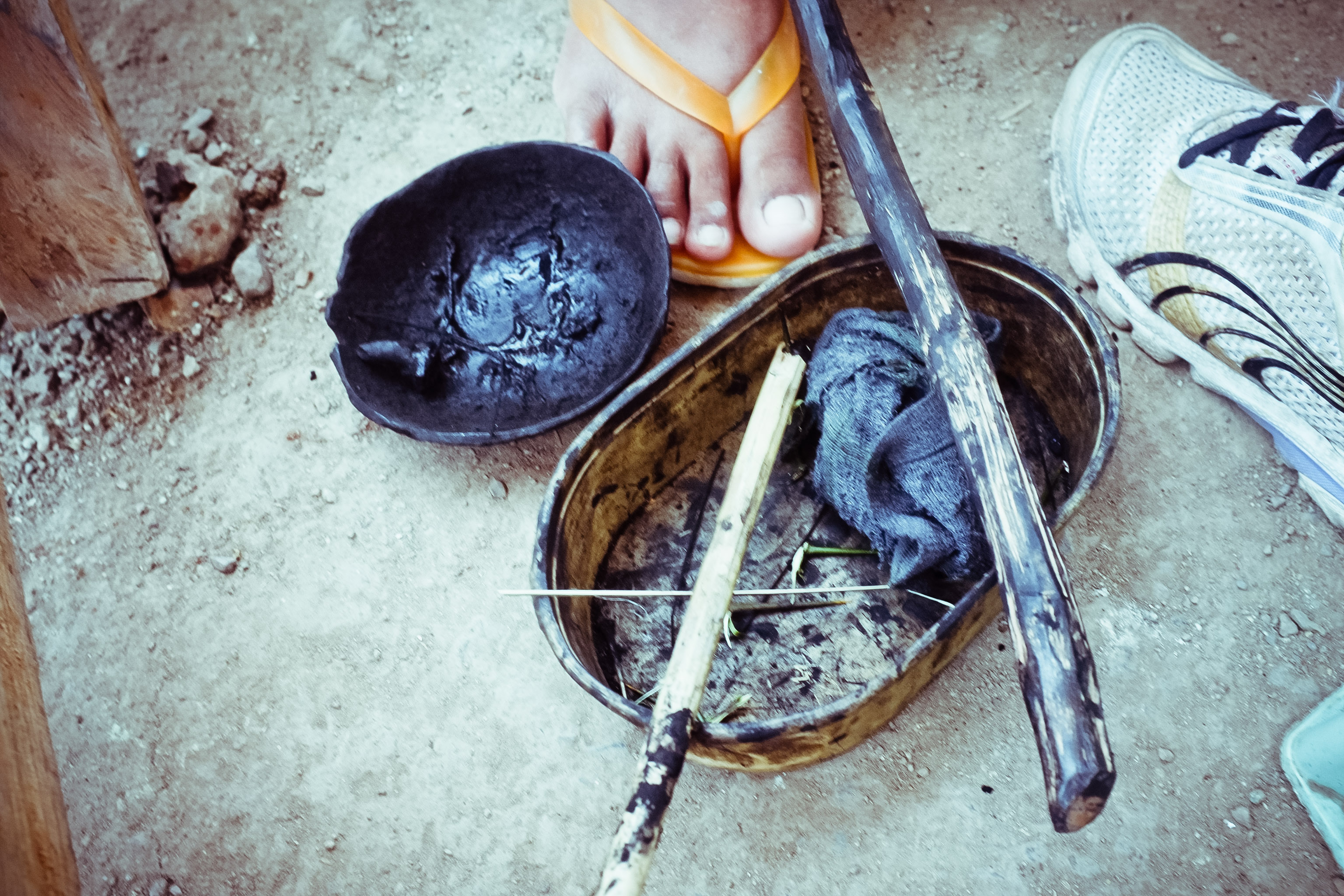
Hafted needle, mallet, and ink bowl used in traditional Filipino tattoos

The artists also commonly traced an outline of the designs on the skin with the ink, using pieces of string or blades of grass, prior to tattooing. In some cases, the ink was applied before the tattoo points are driven into the skin. Most tattoo practitioners were men, though female practitioners also existed. They were either residents to a single village or traveling artists who visited different villages.

Another tattooing technique predominantly practiced by the Lumad and Negrito peoples uses a small knife or a hafted tattooing chisel to quickly incise the skin in small dashes. The wounds are then rubbed with pigment. They differ from the techniques which use points in that the process also produces scarification. Regardless, the motifs and placements are very similar to the tattoos made with hafted needles.

Tattooing was a complicated labor-intensive process that was also very painful to the recipient. Tattoos are acquired gradually over the years, and patterns can take months to complete and heal. The tattooing process were usually sacred events that involved rituals to ancestral spirits (anito) and the heeding of omens. For example, if the artist or the recipient sneezes before a tattooing, it was seen as a sign of disapproval by the spirits, and the session was called off or rescheduled. Artists were usually paid with livestock, heirloom beads, or precious metals. They were also housed and fed by the family of the recipient during the process. A celebration was usually held after a completed tattoo.

== History and archaeology ==
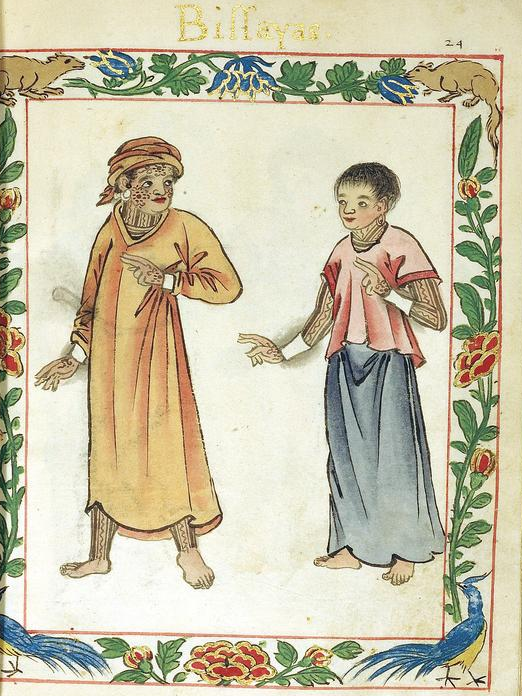
A Visayan timawa (warrior-nobility) couple in the Boxer Codex (c. 1590)

Ancient clay human figurines found in archaeological sites in the Batanes Islands, around 2500 to 3000 years old, have simplified stamped-circle patterns which clearly represent tattoos. Excavations at the Arku Cave burial site in Cagayan Province in northern Luzon have also yielded both chisel and serrated-type heads of possible hafted bone tattoo instruments alongside Austronesian material culture markers like adzes, spindle whorls, barkcloth beaters, and lingling-o jade ornaments. These were dated to before 1500 BCE and are remarkably similar to the comb-type tattoo chisels found throughout Polynesia.

Ancient tattoos can also be found among mummified remains of various Cordilleran peoples in cave and hanging coffin burials in northern Luzon, with the oldest surviving examples of which going back to the 13th century. The tattoos on the mummies are often highly individualized, covering the arms of female adults and the whole body of adult males. A 700 to 900-year-old Kankanaey mummy in particular, nicknamed "Apo Anno", had tattoos covering even the soles of the feet and the fingertips. The tattoo patterns are often also carved on the coffins containing the mummies.

When Antonio Pigafetta of the Magellan expedition (c. 1521) first encountered the Visayans of the islands, he repeatedly described them as "painted all over." The original Spanish name for the Visayans, "Los Pintados" ("The Painted Ones") was a reference to their tattoos.

"Besides the exterior clothing and dress, some of these nations wore another inside dress, which could not be removed after it was once put on. These are the tattoos of the body so greatly practiced among Visayans, whom we call Pintados for that reason. For it was custom among them, and was a mark of nobility and bravery, to tattoo the whole body from top to toe when they were of an age and strength sufficient to endure the tortures of the tattooing which was done (after being carefully designed by the artists, and in accordance with the proportion of the parts of the body and the sex) with instruments like brushes or small twigs, with very fine points of bamboo."

"The body was pricked and marked with them until blood was drawn. Upon that a black powder or soot made from pitch, which never faded, was put on. The whole body was not tattooed at one time, but it was done gradually. In olden times no tattooing was begun until some brave deed had been performed; and after that, for each one of the parts of the body which was tattooed some new deed had to be performed. The men tattooed even their chins and about the eyes so that they appeared to be masked. Children were not tattooed, and the women only one hand and part of the other. The Ilocanos in this island of Manila also tattooed themselves but not to the same extent as the Visayans."

— Francisco Colins, Labor Evangelica (1663),

== Traditions ==
=== Aeta ===
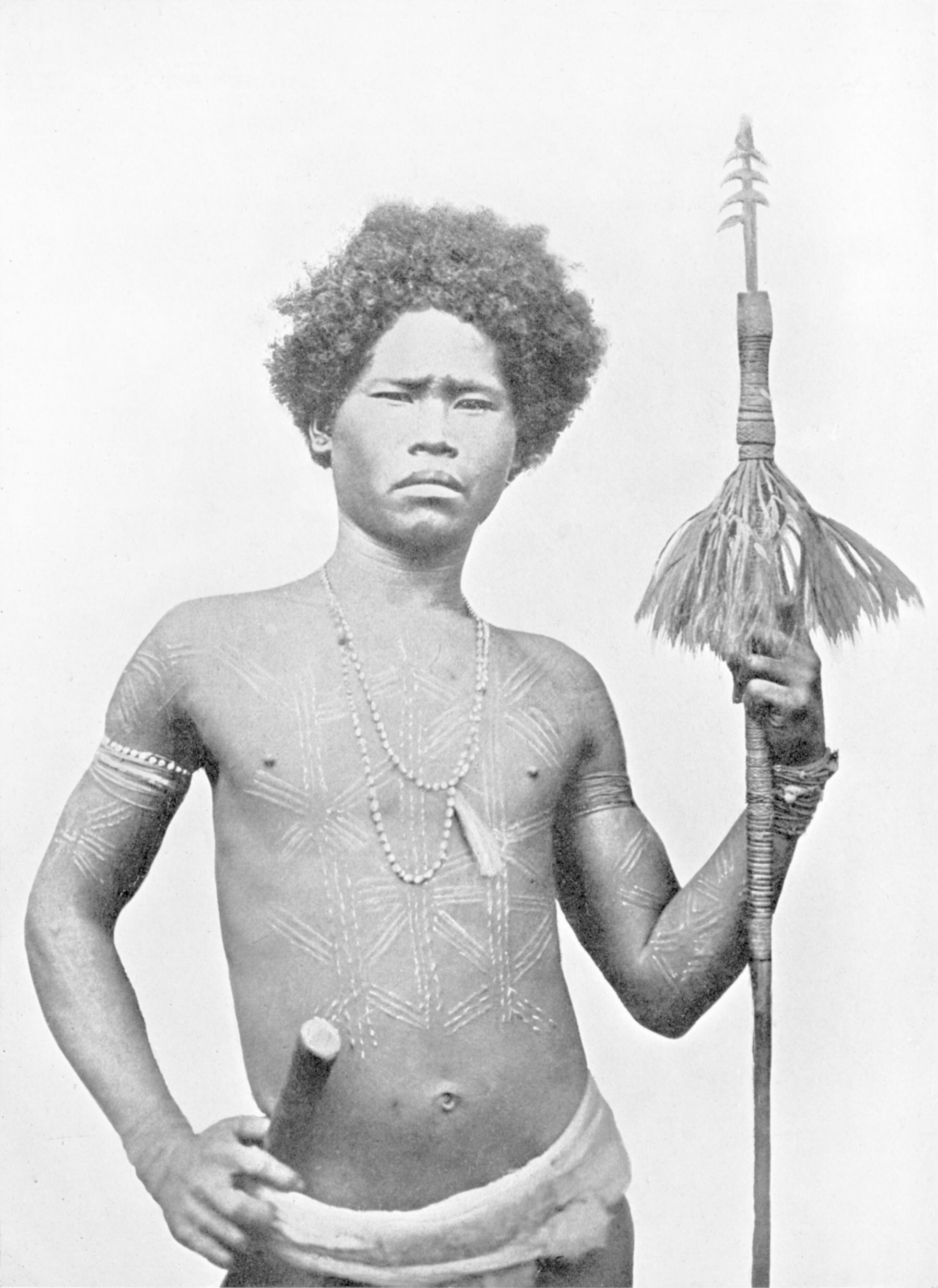
An Aeta man with scarified tattoos (c. 1885)

Among the Aeta peoples, tattoos are known as pika among the Agta and cadlet among the Dumagat.

=== Bicolano ===
Tattoos are known as buri among the Bicolano people. The Spanish recorded that tattooing was just as prominent among the Bicolano people of Albay, Camarines, and Catanduanes, as in the Visayas.

=== Cordilleran ===
The various Cordilleran ethnic groups (also collectively known as "Igorot") of the Cordillera Central mountain range of Northern Luzon have the best-documented and best-preserved tattooing traditions among Filipino ethnic groups. This is due to their isolation and their resistance to colonization during the Spanish colonial era. Tattooing among Cordillerans was regarded as a form of clothing. Having no tattoos was formerly equated to being naked.

Cordilleran tattoos typically depict snakes, centipedes, human figures, dogs, eagles, ferns, grass, rice grains (as diamond shapes), rice paddies, mountains, bodies of water, as well as repeating geometric shapes.

Tattooing was a religious experience among the Cordilleran peoples, involving direct participation of the anito spirits who are attracted to the flowing blood during the process. Men's tattoos, in particular, were strongly associated with the traditions of headhunting. Chest tattoos were not applied until men had taken a head. The practice was outlawed during the American colonial period. The last tattoos associated with headhunting was in World War II, when Cordilleran peoples acquired tattoos for killing Imperial Japanese soldiers.

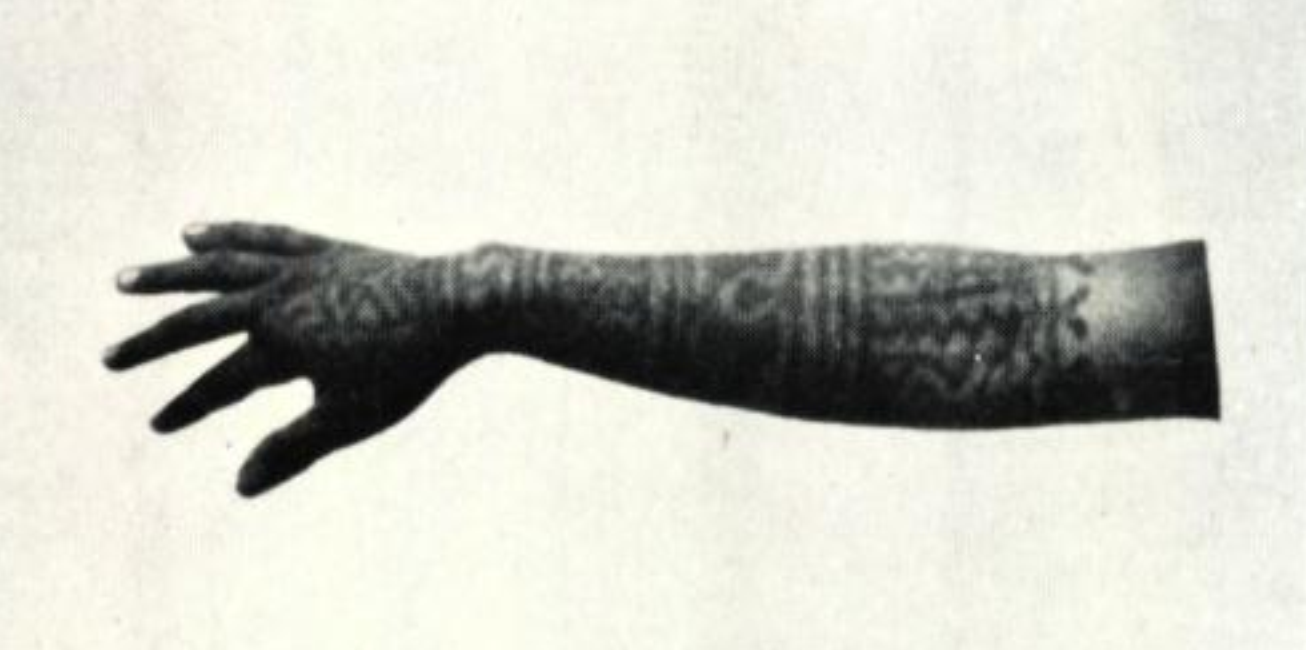
Tattoos on the arm of a Kankanaey woman (1906)

They survived up until the mid-20th century. Headhunting chest tattoos among men were the first to disappear, as the practice of headhunting ceased due to government bans and changing cultural norms. Arm tattoos and other decorative tattoos survived for a little while longer, until modernization and conversion to Christianity finally made most tattooing traditions extinct among Cordillerans. A few elders of the Bontoc and Kalinga people retain tattoos up to today; but they are believed to be extinct among the Kankanaey, Apayao, Ibaloi, and other Cordilleran ethnic groups. Despite this, tattoo designs are preserved among the mummies of the Cordilleran peoples.

There are also modern efforts to preserve the tattoos among younger generations. However, copying the chest tattoo designs of old warriors is seen as taboo since it marks a person as a killer. Copying the older designs is believed to bring bad luck, blindness, or an early death. Even the men who participated in conflicts defending their villages against the military or communist rebels during the Marcos era (1960s to 1970s), refused to acquire traditional chest tattoos on the advice of village elders. Modern Cordilleran designs typically deliberately vary the designs, sizes, and/or locations of tattoos (as well as include more figurative designs of animals and plants) so as not to copy the traditional chest designs of warrior tattoos; though they still use the same techniques, usually have the same general appearance, and have the same social importance.

Among the Butbut Kalinga, whatok sa awi ("tattoos of the past") are distinguished from whatok sa sana ("tattoos of the present") or emben a whatok ("invented tattoos"). The former are culturally significant and are reserved for respected elders; while the latter are modern and used for decorative purposes only. Whatok sa sana are the tattoos given to tourists (both local and foreign), not whatok sa awi. Regardless, whatok sa sana are portions of or have similar motifs to whatok sa awi, and thus are still traditional.

==== Apayao ====
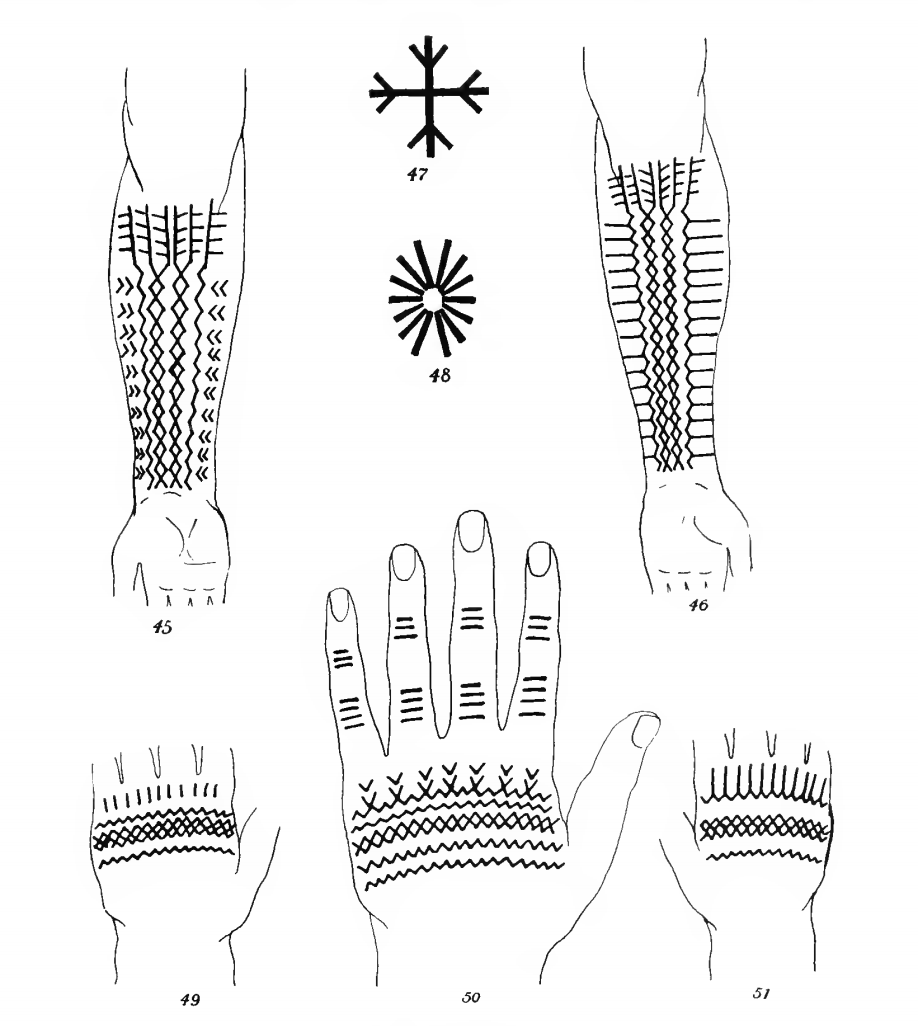
Apayao tattoos (1929)

Among the Apayao people (also known as the Isneg or Isnag), both men and women wore tattoos. The most prominent tattoo is called the andori, which features geometric shapes (like chevrons, zigzags, lines, diamonds, and triangles) that start from the wrist up to the arms and the shoulders. The andori was present in both men and women. In men, it was linked to martial prowess and headhunting. Its length was indicative of the number of enemies the wearer has killed. In women, it indicated the number of enemies her father has killed.

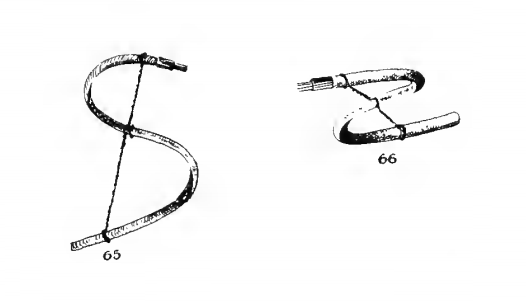
The uniquely S-shaped tattooing instrument (igihisi) of the Apayao people (1929)

Other tattoos for men include the babalakay, sun-like or cross-like tattoos on the thigh that represented spiders; and the hisi, a tattoo on the back of the hand to the middle of the forearm which is uniformly black except for a narrow untattooed line running along the pulse of the wrist. These tattoos are applied to all men as soon as they come of age and are not tied to headhunting. In women, for whom tattoos were largely decorative, they were also tattooed with the babalakay, usually on the throat and sometimes on the forearms, in addition to one or both thighs; and the tutungrat, a series of lines and dots on the back of the hands and fingers. Women's thigh tattoos were normally hidden by the tapis.

The Apayao tattooing tool, known as igihisi is unique among all Cordilleran hafted tools. It consists of an S-shaped curved length of rattan where a bundle of four or five needles are set on one end. Both ends of the rattan are then connected with a string to the middle part of the S-shape. In use, the tattoo artist rapidly taps the curve of the rattan nearest to the bundle of needles. Pigments (talang) made from soot and sugarcane juice are then rubbed unto the wounds created.

Apayao tattooing traditions are extinct today.

==== Bontoc ====
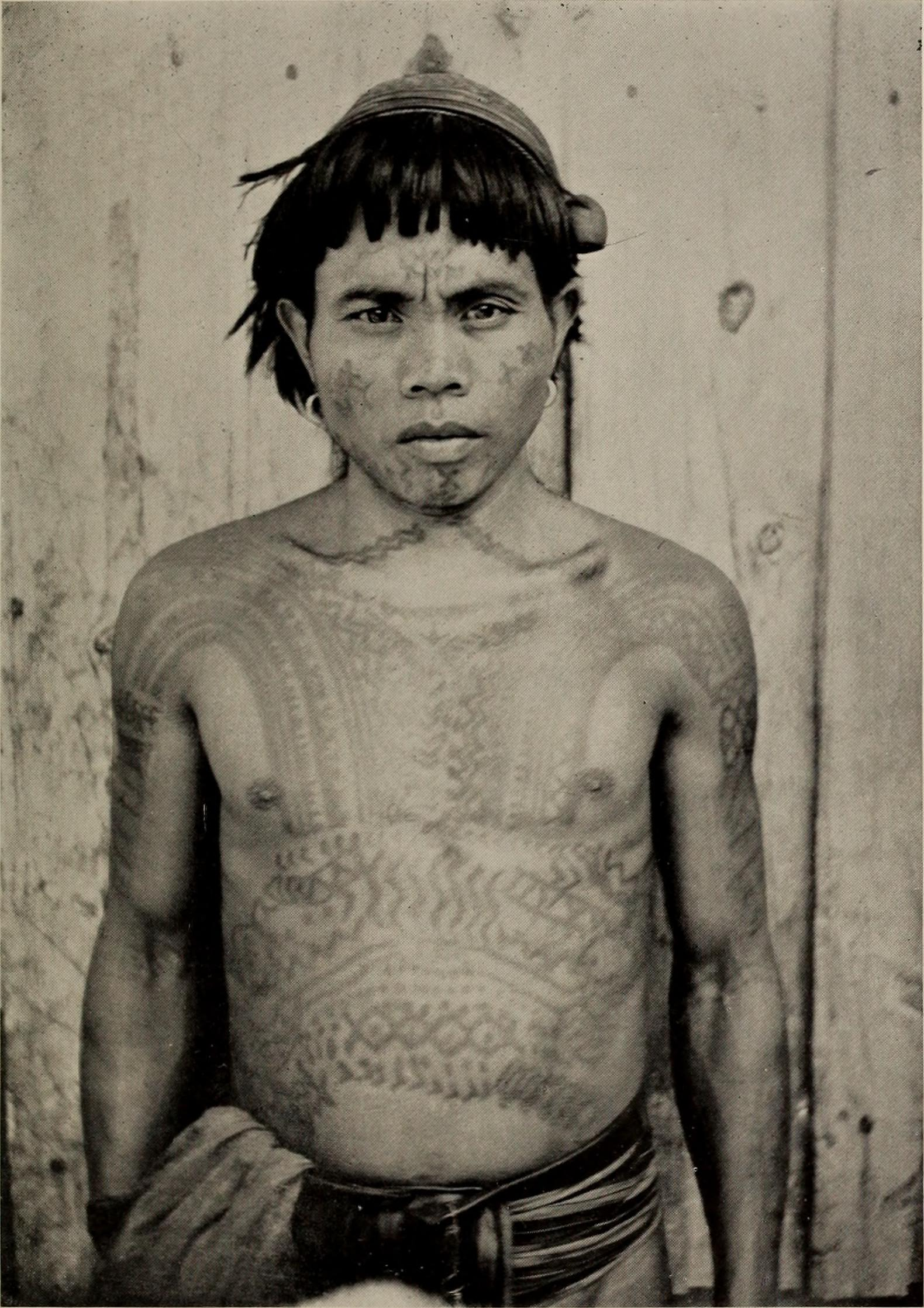
A tattooed Bontoc warrior (1903)

Among the Bontoc people of Mountain Province, tattoos are known as in general as fatek or fatak. There were two special types of fatek: the chaklag which were warrior chest tattoos tied to headhunting; and the pongo, which were arm tattoos of both men and women.

Men were tattooed on the chest, arms, face, stomach, and neck. Boys receive their first tattoo at the age of 10, usually consisting of a simple line on the nose or cheeks. The chaklag is only done after a man has taken his first head in battle. The chaklag begins around the nipple area and moves up to the shoulders and over the upper arms. Two or three sets of horizontal lines are placed on the upper arms, on the ends of the curving main design. When a man earns his chaklag, other members of his ato (a political subdivision within a community), including women and children, would also get tattooed.

Women, in contrast, were usually only tattooed on the arms. Arm tattoos were regarded as beautiful and signified their readiness for marriage. The arms were the most visible parts of the body during traditional dances called sagni. It is believed that men would not court women who are not tattooed.

Bontoc tattoo designs are usually repeating geometric patterns. They include star-like designs (falatong), zigzags (tik-tiko), lattice designs (alad), and ladder designs (tey-tey). In addition, figurative designs are also commonly used, including those depicting centipedes, ferns, rice heavy with grain (pang ti'i), lightning, and the stairs of a traditional house.

The Bontoc traditional tattooing tool is called the chakayyum. It consists of a wooden handle with needles attached at one end. The ink is made from soot mixed with water. Every village among the Bontoc had at least one tattoo artist.

==== Ibaloi ====
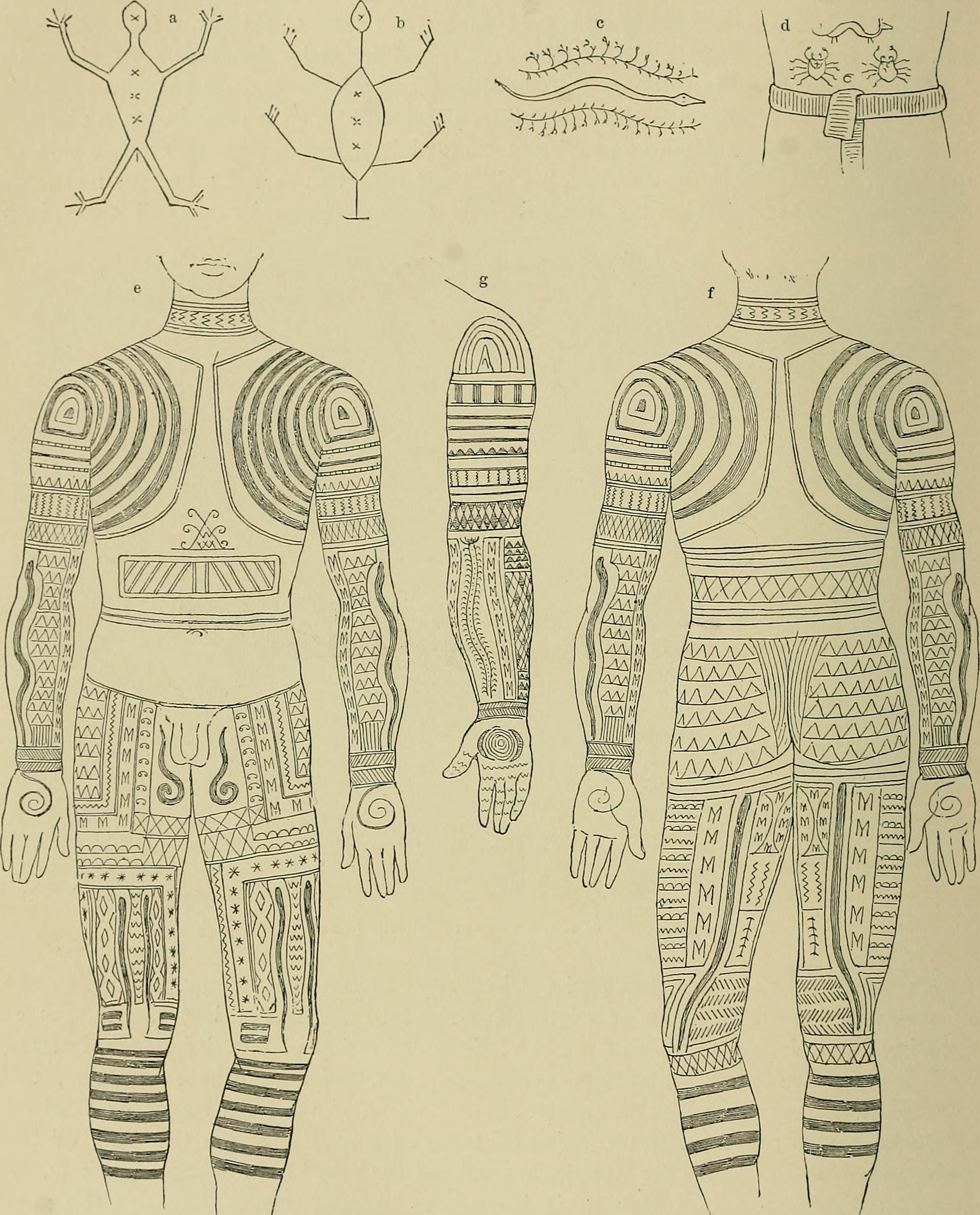
1896 illustration of Ibaloi tattoo patterns (burik), which are records of war exploits and status. The figurative designs included (left to right) a human being (to-o), a lizard (batingal or karat), a snake (oleg), and scorpions. Also note the wheel-like sun (akew) motif on the hands.

Among the Ibaloi people, tattoos are known as burik. It is practiced by both men and women, who were among the most profusely tattooed ethnic groups of the Philippines. Burik traditions are extinct today but survive in the designs found in some elders and in the Ibaloi and Kankanaey mummies in Kabayan, Benguet. Tattoos differed by gender. Women were tattooed only on the forearms and upper arms, while men were tattooed gradually until their entire body was covered completely by the time they reached middle age or old age. The tattoos were believed to be administered to mark significant life events and rites of passage.

Some mummies had unfinished tattoos, indicating they died before the full tattoos could be completed. Many of these mummies were stolen or moved into makeshift glass displays in the mid-1970s. But a majority were preserved in situ and were declared one of the National Cultural Treasures of the Philippines in 1973 through Presidential Decree 260.

"Tattooing is very general amongst them. In some districts you can hardly find a man or woman who has not a figure of the sun tattooed in blue on the back of the hand, for in Central Benguet they worship the sun. Some of them tattoo the breast and arms in patterns of straight and curved lines pricked in with a needle in indigo blue."

— Frederic Henry Read Sawyer, The Inhabitants of the Philippines (1900),

Ibaloi tattoo patterns and designs are also depicted in their funerary blankets (variously known as panagpagpagan, dill-i, or kuabaw). These blankets were used to wrap the corpses of wealthy individuals. The designs are also found carved directly on the wooden coffins of the Kabayan Mummies.

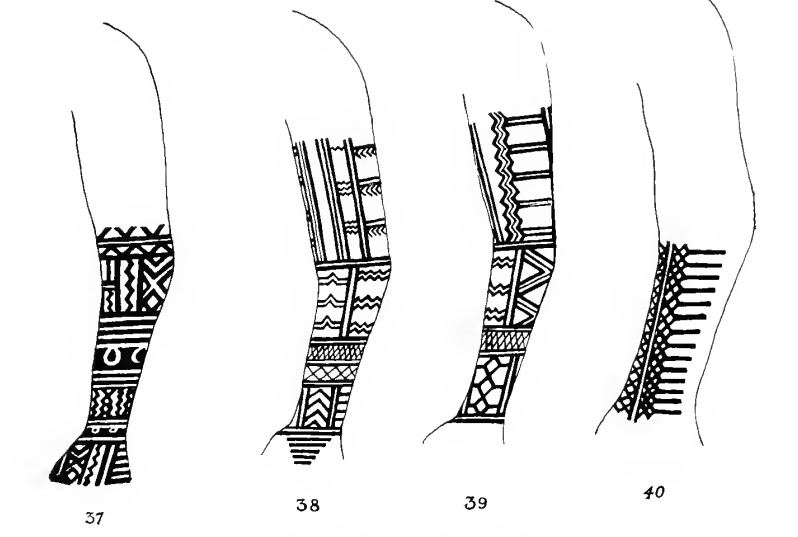
Arm tattoos of an Ibaloi woman (37); a Northern Kalinga woman (38,39); and a Northern Kalinga man (40)

The most characteristic burik design was the wheel-like representation of the sun (akew) tattooed on the backs of both hands (also preserved in the mummies). The entire body was also tattooed with flowing geometric lines, as well as stylized representations of animals and plants. The tattoos usually covered the chest, back, sides of the stomach, buttocks, arms, shoulders, hands, fingers, neck, throat, face, and legs among men. Among women, the tattoos usually begin above the elbow down to the wrist, the back of the hand, and the knuckles of the fingers. The geometric designs included lines and various shapes like circles, triangles, chevrons and others. The animals and plants depicted included centipedes (kamajan), snakes (oleg), lizards (batingal or karat), dogs (aso), and deer (olsa), among others. Other designs included stars (talaw), carabaos (nuang), jawbones (pad-padanga), rice mortars (pinat-pattu), basket weave (inak-akbu), zigzags (tiniktiku or batikua), seeds (pinak-paksey), and rivers (balenay). The designs are often highly individualized, and the preferred designs and combinations vary by village and by individual.

Much of the knowledge of the functions of the designs have been lost to time. Many of these designs were believed to have healing, apotropaic, or magical powers, and tied in closely with the indigenous animistic beliefs of the Ibaloi people. The animals and plants depicted were considered manifestations of ancestor spirits or omen creatures. Snakes, for example, are believed to be manifestations of wise ancestor spirits. While an ever-present design, the to-o, which depicted a small human figure with the arms and legs bent outwards at the elbows and knees, represented humankind in the material world. The sun, an iconic motif, was also considered a powerful nature spirit and a supreme deity, and was appealed to during hardships. The sun figures prominently in funerary rites, where the dead are always interred facing the sun. This is due to the belief that when the soul (kalaching) awakens in the spirit world, they will be greeted by their ancestors to join them in the convergence place of the spirits (kaapuan) on Mount Pulag.

Tattoos were also indicative of wealth and social status. Arm tattoos in men were particularly important as indications that their wearer belonged to a wealthy family (baknang), and not all men had them. Arm tattoos were also done for descendants of prominent members of a community. But the most important function of tattoos among the Ibaloi is to serve as identification markers so that their spirits will be recognized by their ancestors in the afterlife.

Tattoos were applied using hafted techniques. The needle was made from plant thorns (like citrus). The tattooing tools of the Ibaloi usually have a bundle of three needles, staggered apart slightly so that the points do not reach the skin at the same time. The ink was described as being derived from the fruits of the atilba plant (Viburnum luzonicum), or from soot and water (or pig's bile) mixed with leaves from a native tomato-like plant. In the early 20th century, steel sewing needles (panatak) were also being used to tattoo both Ibaloi and Kankanaey women. However, most of these women would have already passed away by the 1980s. Ibaloi tattoo artists could either be male or female. Burik tattoos would take months to finish, and the tattoo artist often stayed with the client during the entire time, becoming almost a part of the client's family. The client was responsible for providing food and shelter for the artist.

==== Ifugao ====
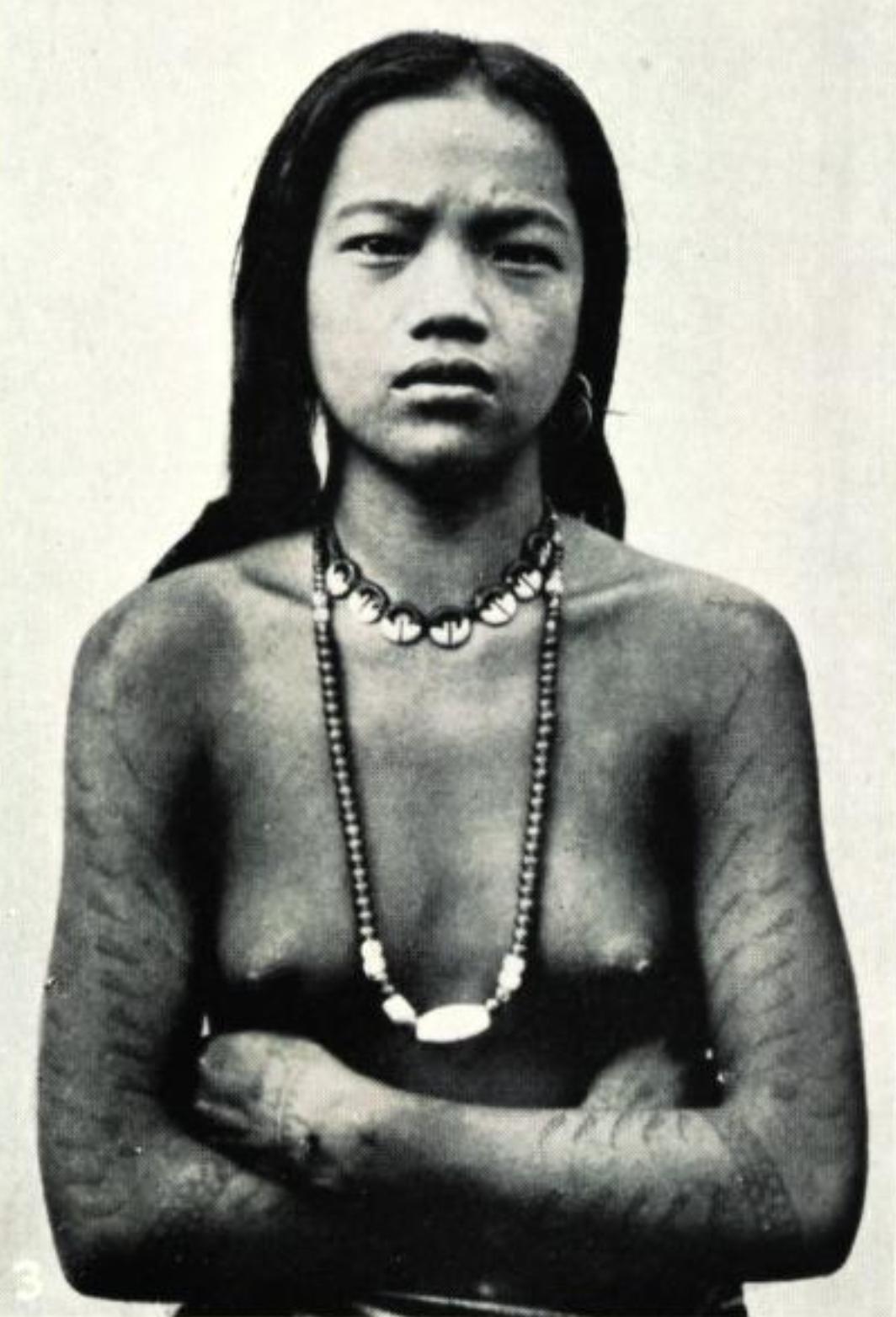
A young Ifugao woman from Banaue showing characteristic inangkid (fern) and pongo (bracelet) tattoos on her arms (1906)

Tattoos among the Ifugao people are known as batok. Like in other Cordilleran groups, Ifugao tattoos were strongly linked to headhunting and social status. They were also believed to have magical powers of protection, helped warriors during battle, and were symbols of beauty.

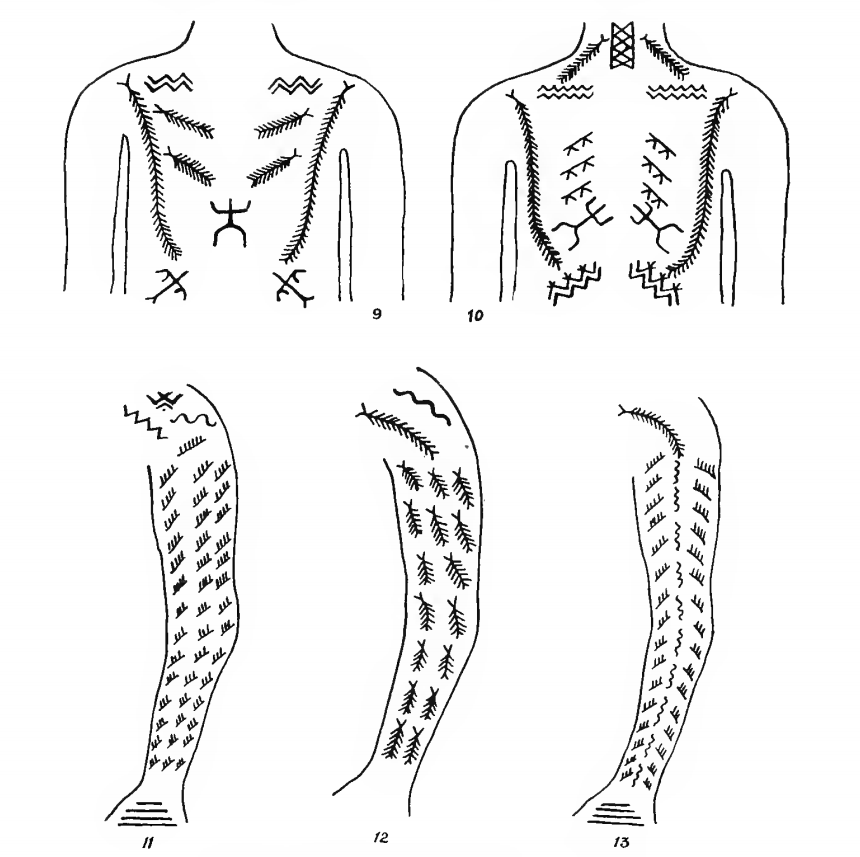
Ifugao tattoos (1929)

Men are usually tattooed on the chest, arms, shoulders, legs, cheeks, chin, and forehead. Only warriors who had taken heads can wear the chaklag (chest tattoos) and the ardan (a ladder tattoo on the neck). The Ifugao chaklag starts at the nipple and moves up to the shoulders and the upper arms. It consists of curvilinear designs. Women, on the other hand, were tattooed on the arms up to the shoulderblades as a sign of maturity and eligibility for marriage.

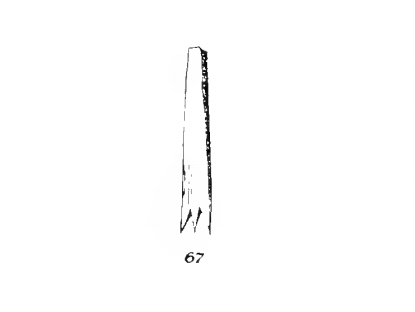
Ifugao tattooing instrument (1929)

Common Ifugao motifs include the kinabu or kinahu (dog), usually placed on the chest and cheeks; tinagu or tinatagu (small human figures), usually on the center of the chest; ginawang (eagles), usually on the chest and shoulders; ginayaman (centipedes), placed anywhere; kinilat (lightning), usually on the neck, shoulders, and lower chest; hinuliab (repeating chevrons and X-shapes), usually on shoulders, neck, arms, and thighs; pinulikawkaw (wavy lines); tiniku (zigzag lines); hinanghangal (vertical repeating X-shapes bordered by lines), usually on the throat; pongo (various bracelet patterns), usually on women's arms; halapag (parallel lines), usually on forehead and backs of hands; and scorpions. Arm tattoos were usually fern (inangkid), grass, and other plant motifs forming bands around the forearms and upper arms.

The Ifugao tattoo instrument is comb-like with two or three points. Early 20th century examples were made entirely out of metal. Ifugao tattoos are largely extinct today and only survived among some older individuals.

==== Itneg ====
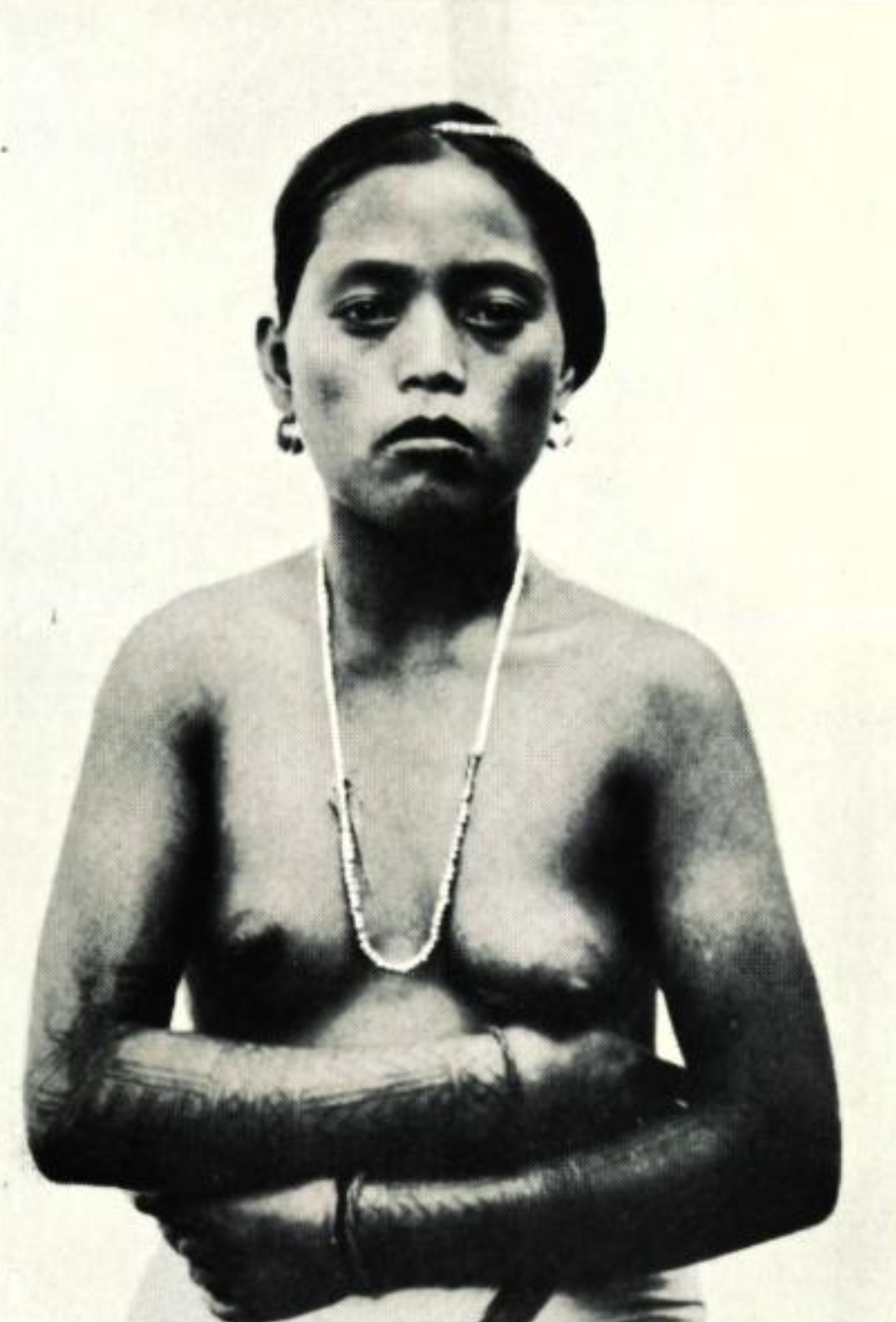
Tattoo patterns on the forearms of an Itneg woman from Balbalan, Kalinga (1906)

In The Inhabitants of the Philippines (1900), the author describes two subgroups of the Banao people (itself a subgroup of the Itneg or "Tinguian" people), the Busao and the Burik people, as having elaborate tattoos, though he also notes that the custom was in the process of disappearing by the time he described them:

"The Busao Igorrotes who live in the North of Lepanto, tattoo flowers on their arms, and in war-dress wear a cylindrical shako made of wood or plaited rattan, and large copper pendants on their ears. These people do not use the talibon, and prefer the spear. The Burik Igorrotes tattoo their body in a curious manner, giving them the appearance of wearing a coat of mail. But this custom is probably now becoming obsolete, for at least those of the Igorrotes who live near the Christian natives are gradually adopting their dress and customs."

— Frederic Henry Read Sawyer, The Inhabitants of the Philippines (1900),

The hafted tools used by the Itneg were described as having a brush-like bundle of ten needles made of plant thorns attached to a handle made from a bent buffalo horn. The "ink" was made from soot obtained by burning a certain type of resinous wood.

Most other groups of Itneg people were already being assimilated by Christianized lowlanders by the 19th century. Among these groups of Itneg, tattooing was not as prominent. Adult women usually tattooed their forearms with delicate patterns of blue lines, but these are usually covered up completely by the large amounts of beads and bracelets worn by women. Some men tattoo small patterns on their arms and legs, which are the same patterns they use to brand their animals or mark their possessions. Warrior tattoos that indicate successful head-hunts were already extinct among the "civilized" Itneg, and warriors were not distinguished with special identifying marks or clothing from the general population.

==== Kalinga ====
Tattoos among the Kalinga peoples are known as batok or batek (whatok in Butbut Kalinga). They are among the best known Cordilleran tattoos due to the efforts of Apo Whang-od. She was once known as the "last mambabatok (tattoo artist)", though she is currently teaching younger artists to continue the tradition.

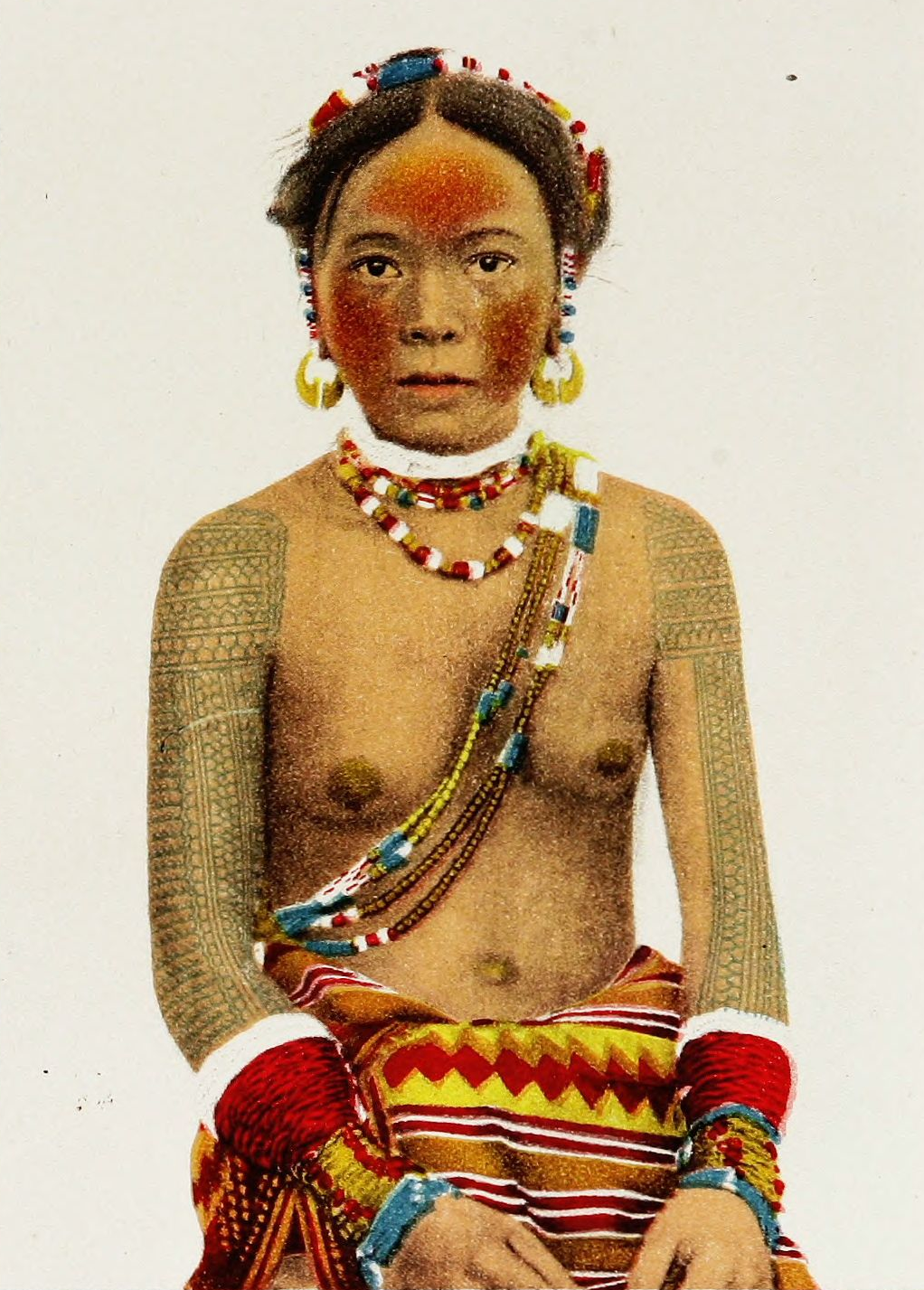
A young Lubuagan Kalinga woman with traditional face paint and arm tattoos (1913)

Common tattoo motifs include centipedes (gayaman), centipede legs (tiniktiku), snakes (tabwhad), snakeskin (tinulipao), hexagonal shapes representing snake belly scales (chillag), coiled snakes (inong-oo), rain (inud-uchan), various fern designs (inam-am, inalapat, and nilawhat), fruits (binunga), parallel lines (chuyos), alternating lines (sinagkikao), hourglass shapes representing day and night (tinatalaaw), rice mortars (lusong), pig's hind legs (tibul), rice bundles (sinwhuto or panyat), criss-crossing designs (sina-sao), ladders (inar-archan), eagles (tulayan), frogs (tokak), and axe blades (sinawit). The same designs are used to decorate textiles, pottery, and tools. Some designs even specifically mimic the designs on the garments normally worn on that body part. Each design has different symbolic meanings or magical/talismanic abilities. The tinulipao, for example, is believed to camouflage warriors and protect them from attacks. Ferns indicates that a woman is ready to conceive, enhances their health, and protects against stillbirth. The hourglass and rice mortar designs indicate that a family is wealthy. Rice bundles symbolize abundance.

Like in other Cordilleran groups, men's tattoos were intimately linked to headhunting. Murder was considered wrong in Kalinga society, but the killing of an enemy was seen as noble act, and part of the nakem (sense of responsibility) by warriors for the protection of the entire village. A boy can only acquire tattoos after participating in a successful headhunting expedition (kayaw) or inter-village warfare (baraknit), even if they did not personally take part in the kill. The boy is allowed to cut the head off of slain enemies, thereby transitioning into adulthood (igam) and gaining the right to acquire a tattoo. Their first tattoo is known as the gulot (literally "cutter of the head", also pinaliid or binulibud in Butbut Kalinga). These were three parallel lines encircling the forearm, starting at the wrist.

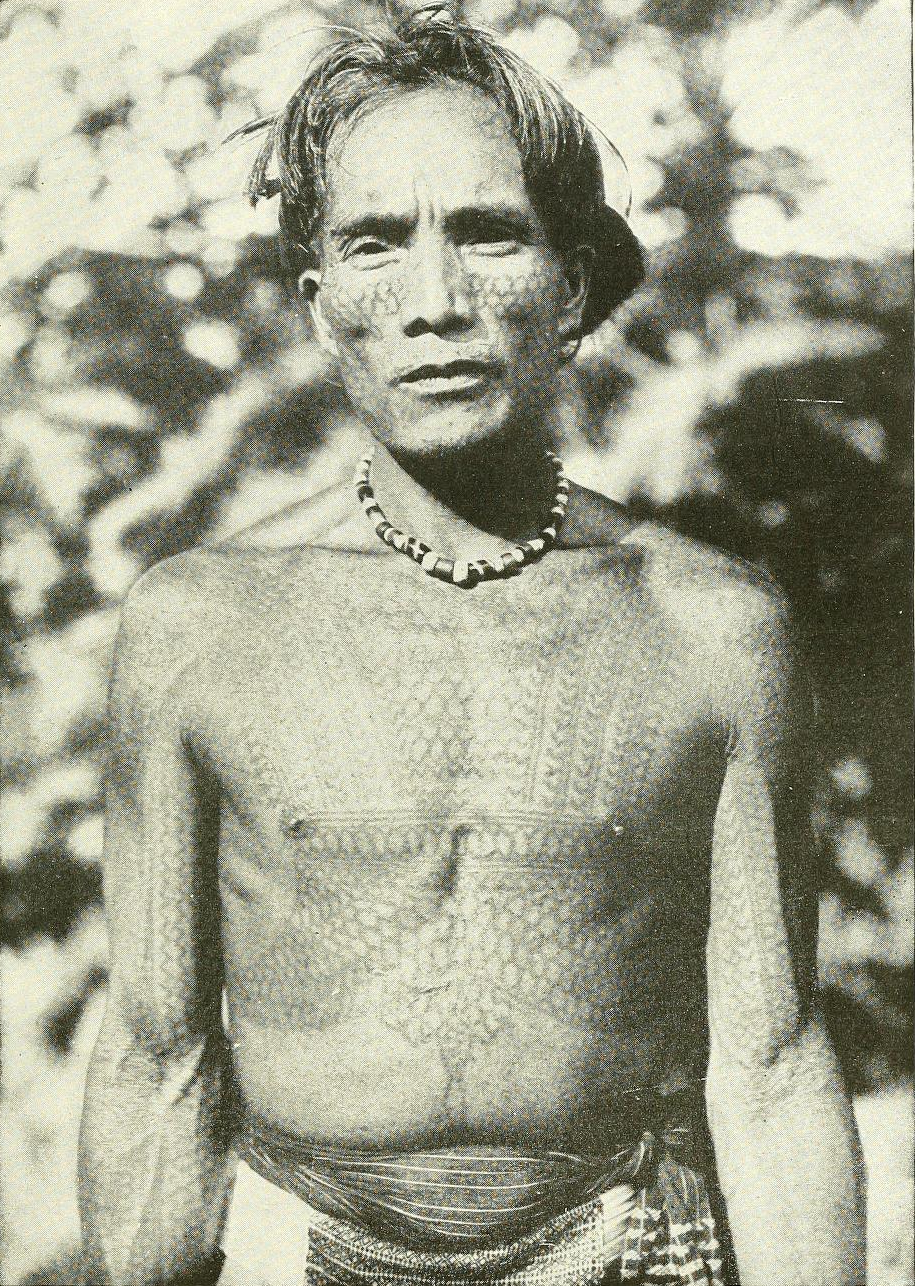
Lakay Wanawan of the Kalinga people (c. 1912), a renowned warrior and later a pangat (tribal elder). Note the biking chest tattoos and the face tattoos.

Further participation in raids entitled him to more tattoos, until he finally receives the chest tattoos (biking or bikking, whiing among the Butbut Kalinga) that indicates his high social standing as part of the warrior class (kamaranan). The biking is a symmetrical design consisting of horizontal patterns on the upper abdomen, followed by parallel curving lines connecting the chest to the upper shoulders. Men with biking tattoos are considered to be respected warriors (maingor, mingol, or maur'mot). Back tattoos (dakag) were earned when a warrior successfully kills an enemy but retreats during a battle. The dakag consists of a vertical pattern following the spine, flanked by horizontal patterns following the ribs. Elite warriors who have fought in face-to-face combat had both chest and back tattoos. Both warriors and tattooed elders (papangat, former warriors) had the highest status in Kalinga society. Men's tattoos were believed to confer both spiritual and physical protection, similar to a talisman.

Women were tattooed on the arms, backs of the hands, shoulder blades, and in some cases, the breasts and the throat. Women's tattoos begin at adolescence, at about 13 to 15 years old, usually just shortly before or after the menarche (dumara). These were initially giant centipede designs made on the neck, shoulder blades, and arms. The tattoos are believed to help ease menstrual pain as well as signalling suitors that she is ready to marry. Tattoos on women's arms (known as sinokray) typically have several motifs, separated by lines. The children and the female first cousins of a renowned warrior were also tattooed to record their membership to a lineage of warriors.

Pregnant women also receive a characteristic tattoo known as the lin-lingao or chung-it. These are small x-marks made on the forehead, cheeks, and the tip of the nose. The marks are believed to confuse the spirits of slain enemies, protecting the women and the unborn children from their vengeance.

Tattoos were also believed to allow ancestor spirits to see if a person is worthy of joining them in the spirit world (Jugkao).

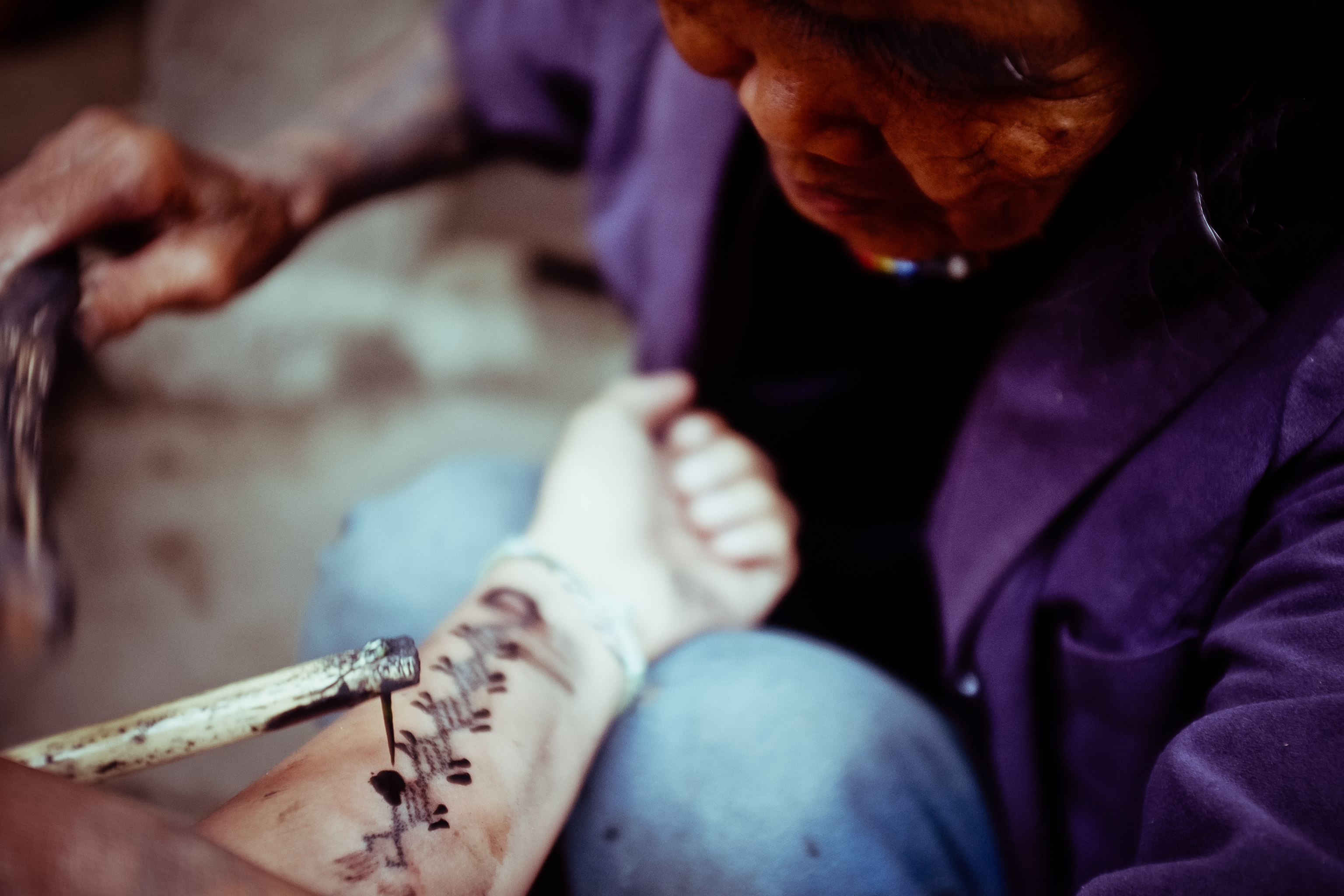
Apo Whang-od applying a snake (tabwhad) tattoo

Aside from prestige and ritual importance, tattoos were also considered aesthetically pleasing. Tattooed women are traditionally considered beautiful (ambaru or whayyu), while tattooed men were considered strong (mangkusdor). During pre-colonial times, people without tattoos were known as dinuras (or chinur-as in Butbut Kalinga) and were teased as cowards and bad omens for the community. The social stigma usually encouraged people to get tattooed.

Tattoo artists were predominantly male among the Kalinga, female artists were rarer. They are known as manbatok or manwhatok. Tattoos are first outlined with uyot, a dried rice stalk bent into a triangle, or with shaped wooden blocks. These are dipped into ink and used to trace patterns into the skin before the tattoos are applied. The uyot also serves to measure the scale of the tattoos, ensuring they are symmetrical.

The ink is traditionally made from powdered charcoal or soot from cooking pots mixed with water in a half coconut shell and thickened with starchy tubers. They are applied to the skin using an instrument known as the gisi (also kisi), these can either be citrus thorns inserted at a right angle to a stick, or a carabao horn bent with heat with a cluster of metal needles at the tip. The gisi is placed over the tattoo location and rapidly tapped with another stick (the pat-ik). The gisi can also be used to measure distances in symmetrical tattoos. The citrus thorn is preferred because the strong smell is believed to drive away malevolent spirits (ayan) which are attracted to the blood (chara). The tattooing process is traditionally accompanied by chanting, which is believed to enhance the magical potency and efficacy of tattoos.

Tattoo artists traditionally commanded very expensive fees. A chest tattoo for men or two arm tattoos for women, for example, would cost a pig, an amount of rice, an amount of silver, two kain (skirts) or bahag (loincloths), and beads of an equivalent price to a carabao or pig.

==== Kankanaey ====
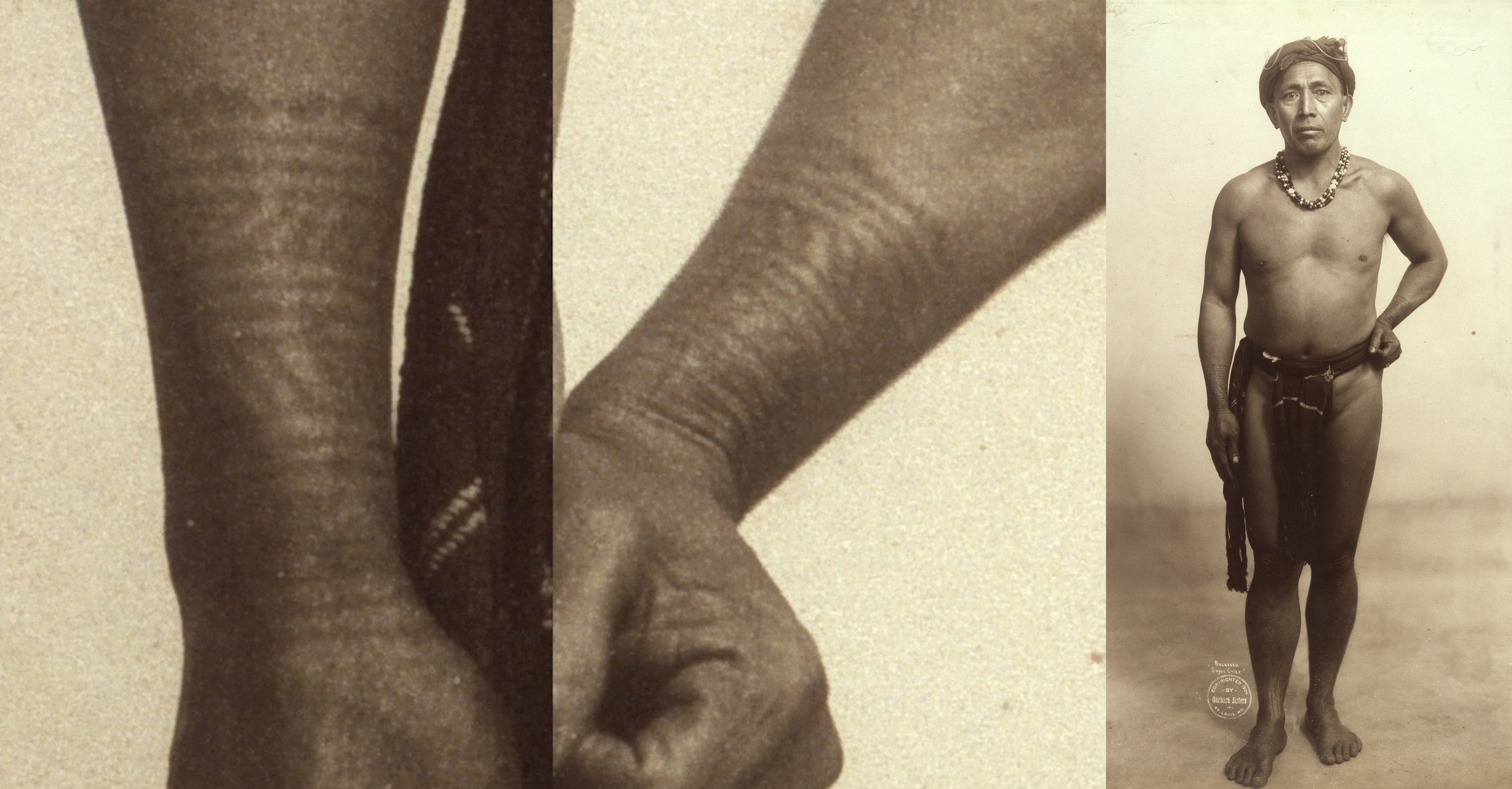
Detail of forearm tattoos on Bucassen, chieftain of the Suyoc Kankanaey at the 1904 St. Louis World's Fair. Note the absence of a headhunter's chest tattoo.

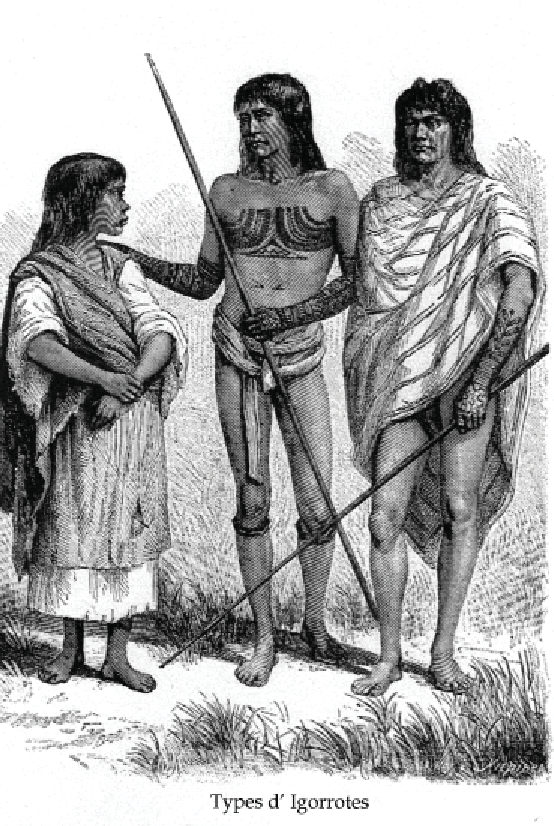
Drawing of tattooed Kankanaey people by the French naturalist Antoine-Alfred Marche (1887)

Kankanaey tattoos (bátak) are very similar to the neighboring Ibaloi tattoos, both in design and location, and were just as extensively practiced. They survive in the designs found in the Ibaloi and Kankanaey mummies in Kabayan, Benguet. The most famous of the mummies, a Kankanaey man named Apo Anno ("Elder Anno") from Natubleng, Buguias, Benguet, dated from c. 1100-1300 CE, has very well-preserved whole-body tattoos that covered even the fingertips and the soles of the feet. He was a legendary hunter, the son of the chieftain Tugtugaka of the community of Nabalicong in Buguias, Benguet. His mother was allegedly a non-human guardian spirit of forest animals named Cuyapon.

Another description comes from the French naturalist Antoine-Alfred Marche, who visited Mankayan, Benguet in the late 19th century. He noted that the Kankanaey tattoos were "done with great precision and depicting serpents and flowers sometimes, but most frequently executed with great care and method. As one becomes richer and more powerful, the designs increase. Some [Kankanaey] only have them around their wrists, while others have their arms, legs, and torso completely tattooed." Illustrations of Kankanaey tattoos were also drawn by his companion.

Descriptions of the tattoos of two chieftains of the Kankanaey people (known in historical records as the "Lepanto Igorot") were also recorded after they were taken to Madrid for the Exposición General de las Islas Filipinas in 1887. One of the chieftains (Gumad-ang) was described as having curved lines on the back of his arms that signified his tribal affiliation. The other chieftain, Lao-Lao, was described as having a toothed wheel representing the sun on the back of his right hand; another wheel with a cross in the center on the back of his left hand; two dog figures on his right arm; a dog and a frog figure on his left arm; another dog figure in his upper abdomen; and multiple scarified marks on his chest, abdomen, legs, and arms.

Both men and women wore tattoos. Men's tattoos were tied to headhunting and accomplishments in battle. It was rarer for men to have the full set of tattoos because headhunting as a practice was already in decline among the Kankanaey, who came under the Spanish colonial jurisdiction in the mid-19th century. Arm and hand tattoos in both men and women persisted longer since they were not tied to headhunting. Kankanaey tattoos today are virtually extinct.

The Kankanaey tattoo instrument is called a gisi. It consists of a set of thorns (or metal needles in recent times) set on a wooden handle. It is tapped unto the skin with a mallet.

=== Ibanag ===
The Ibanag people called their tattoos bato’. They were symbols of status and martial prowess and were most prominent among the Ibanag warriors (mengal). Ibanag tattoos were limited, with less variations than their neighbors (and traditional enemies), the Cordillerans. Unfortunately, most traditional Ibanag designs were undocumented. The only design described in colonial records is the appaku, from paku ("fern"), which were fern patterns applied on the back of the hands in a glove-like appearance.

However, since tattoo designs are usually identical with general crafting decorative patterns, it can be assumed that design patterns that survive in other Ibanag material culture (like in weaving, goldworking, and smithing), were also used for tattoos. These include designs like lozenges or eye shapes (nammata-mata), zigzags (lassigassing), stripes (buri-buri), and human figures (inattolayan), among others.

The Ibanag people believed that people without tattoos could not enter the lands of their ancestors in the spirit world.

=== Ilocano ===
Among the Ilocano people, tattoos were known as burik or bátek, they primarily tattooed their arms or hands, though their tattooing practices were not as extensive as those of their neighboring Cordilleran (Igorot) ethnolinguistic groups, such as the Itneg (Tinguian), or the Visayan peoples.

=== Manobo ===
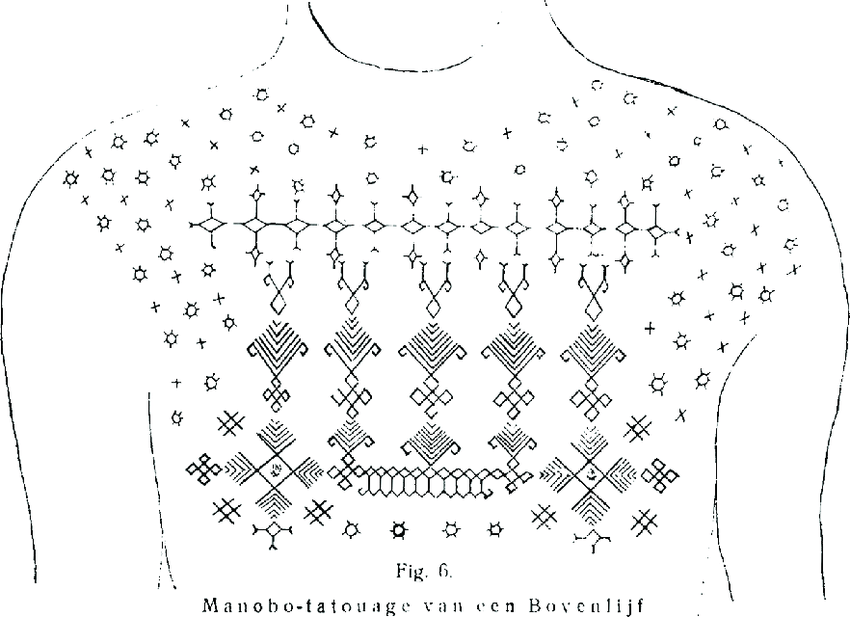
Agusan Manobo chest tattoos (1925)

Traditional tattooing among the Manobo peoples of Agusan, Bukidnon, and the Davao Region of Mindanao (including the Agusan Manobo, Arakan Manobo, Kulaman Manobo, Matiglangilan, Matigsalug, Tagakaulo, Tigwahonon, Matigtalomo, Matigsimong, and the Bagobo, among others) is known as pangotoeb (also spelled pa-ngo-túb, pengeteb, or pengetev; or erroneously as "pang-o-túb"). Manobo tattooing traditions were first recorded in 1879 by Saturnino Urios, a Jesuit missionary in Butuan, who wrote that "[The Manobo] wore their pretty costumes, their hair long, their bodies tattooed like some of the European convicts." It was also noted by other 19th-century European explorers, including German explorer Alexander Schadenberg.

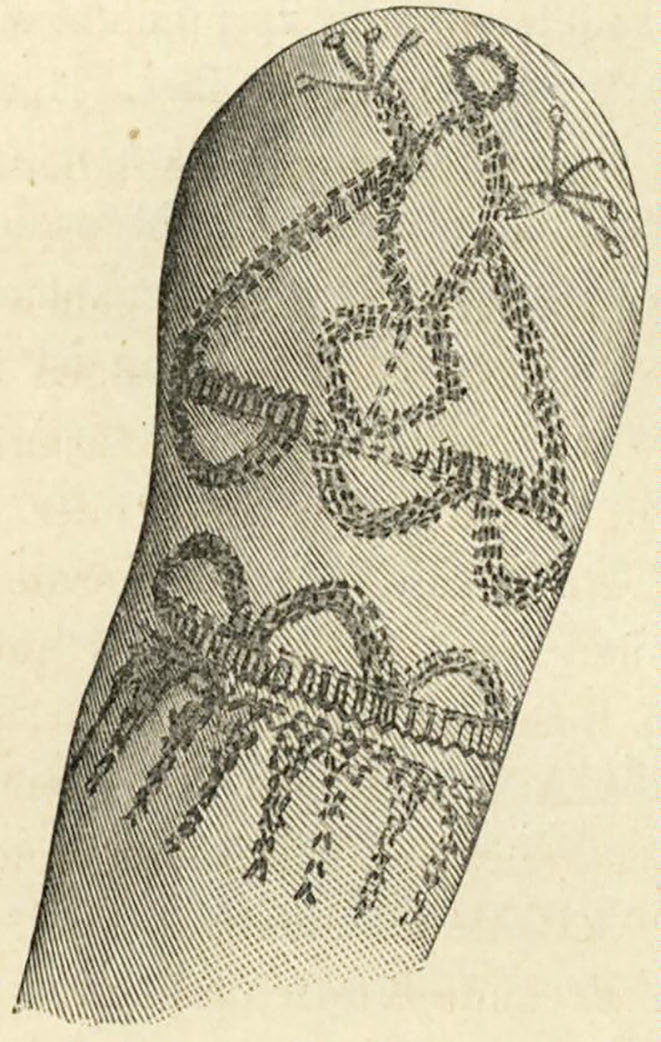
Bagobo upper arm tattoos (1885)

Both men and women are tattooed, usually starting at around 8 to 10 years old. The location and designs of tattoos vary by tribe and by sex. Among the Manobo of the Pantaron Mountains, tattoos on the forearms and chest/breasts are found in both sexes, but tattoos on the lower legs and lower abdomen are restricted to women.

The designs of pangotoeb are predominantly simple repeating geometric shapes like lines, circles, triangles, and squares. They can also represent animals (like paloos, monitor lizards), plants (like salorom, ferns), or human shapes. The patterns have individual names like linabod (parallel diagonal lines) or ngipon-ngipon (an unbroken straight line in between two broken lines).

Unlike most Philippine tattooing traditions, Manobo tattoos are not compulsory and do not indicate rank or status. They are largely decorative, though women's tattoos on the lower abdomen are believed to help ease childbirth as well as giving women strength for working the fields. The designs and amount of tattoos are also based solely on the preference of the recipient, though it is limited by location and what designs are appropriate for the recipient's sex.

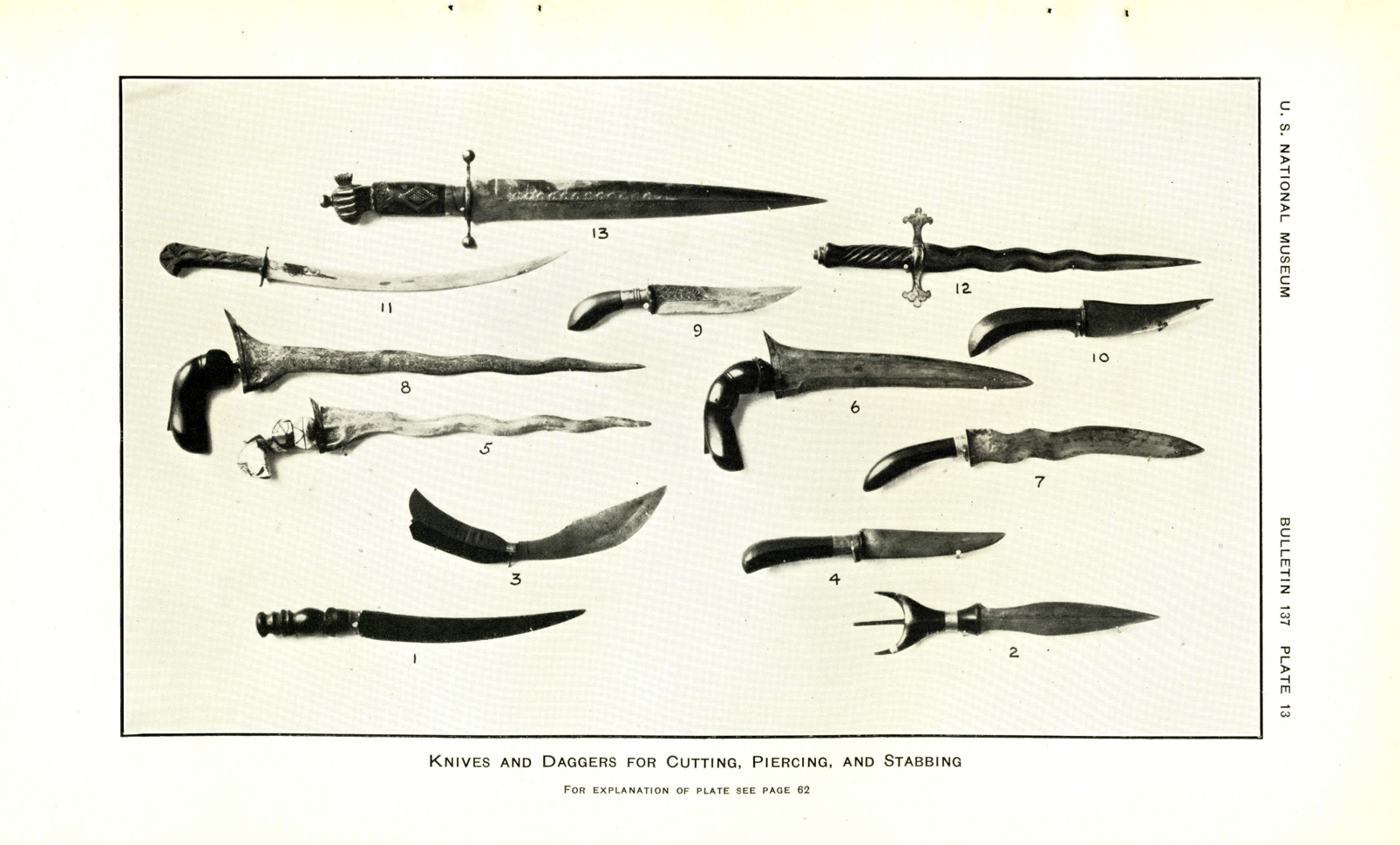
The curving Bagobo blade (3) labeled as a "woman's knife" is a sagni (1926)

Parents would usually encourage children to get tattoos by telling stories of a gigantic supernatural creature called Ologasi, which would supposedly eat people who are not tattooed during the end times (baton). In Manobo mythology, Ologasi is depicted as an antagonist and a guardian of the gate to the spirit world (Somolaw) where the souls of the dead travel to by boat. Tattoos are also believed to help illuminate the way for a soul traveling to the afterlife.

Mangotoeb, tattoo artists, are also keepers of the knowledge of tattoo meanings. They are predominantly female or (historically) feminized men. Some male practitioners exist but are restricted to tattooing other men, as touching the body of a woman who is not a relative or their spouse is regarded as socially inappropriate in Manobo culture. Mangotoeb learn their trade by apprenticing to an older practitioner from childhood (usually a relative).

Mangotoeb are traditionally offered gifts by the recipient before the tattooing process, usually beads (baliog), fiber leglets (tikos), and food. This was to "remove the blood from the eyes" of the artist, as it is believed that over time, the artist's eyesight can fail due to seeing the blood incurred in the tattooing process. Certain taboos (liliyan or pamaleye) also exist during the process. This includes the prohibition of the recipient from grabbing someone during the process (including the artist), not washing the new tattoos with water, and keeping the tattoo uncovered with clothing for at least three days after the process. However, the tattooing process itself is not regarded as a religious event, and do not involve rituals to the anito.

The tattooing process involves two documented techniques. The first uses a hafted bundle of needles to prick the skin in rapid tapping motions with a mallet, similar to other Austronesian groups in the Philippines. The second uses a small blade called goppos (also ilab or sagni). It is held like a pen by the artist and used to make quick short dash-like cuts on the skin, a few millimeters in length and depth. Unlike the hafted needle technique, this process also produces scarification. The ink is soot resulting from burning certain species of trees, most notably salumayag (Agathis philippinensis). In modern times, with the increasing rarity of native trees, some artists use soot from burned rubber tires instead. During the healing process, the wounds are rubbed with heated nodules of an epiphyte called kagopkop, which soothes the itching and supposedly keeps the tattoo color dark.

=== Visayan ===
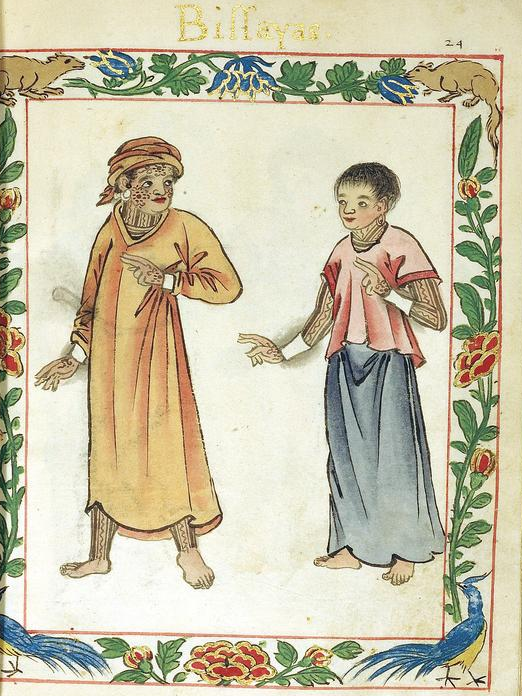
Tattooed Visayan timawa (warrior nobility), with visible tattoos beneath their clothing (Boxer Codex, c. 1590)

Visayans had the most prominent and documented tattooing traditions among Philippine ethnic groups. The first Spanish name for the Visayans, Los Pintados ("The Painted Ones") was a reference to the tattooed people particularly of Samar, Leyte, Mindanao, Bohol, and Cebu, whom were the first of such encountered by the Magellan expedition in the Philippine islands.

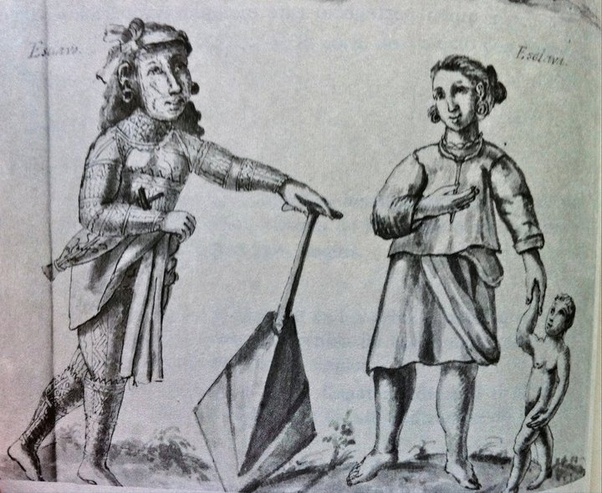
A tattooed Visayan uluhan (commoner warrior) with a paddle from Historia de las Islas e Indios de Bisayas (1668)

Tattoos were called batok (also spelled batuk) or patik and tattooed individuals were generally known as binatakan (also: batukan, batkan, hamatuk, or himatuk). Renowned warriors covered in tattoos were known as lipong. Both sexes had tattoos. It was expected of adults to have them, with the exception of asog (feminized men, usually shamans) for whom it was socially acceptable to be mapuraw or puraw (unmarked, compare with Samoan pulaʻu). Tattoos were so highly regarded that men will often just wear a loincloth (bahag) to show them off. The most elaborately tattooed were members of the royal (kadatuan) and nobility (tumao) classes.

Visayan tattoos were characterized by bold lines and geometric and floral designs on the chest and buttocks. Tattoo designs varied by region. They can be repeating geometric designs, stylized representations of animals, and floral or sun-like patterns. The most distinctive feature is the labid, filled lines around 1 in (2.5 cm) thick that can either be straight, zigzagging, or sinuous. Shoulder work was ablay; chest and throat as dubdub; arms as daya-daya (or tagur in Panay); and waist as hinawak. Elite warriors also often had frightening mask-like facial tattoos on chin and face (reaching up to the eyelids) called bangut or langi meant to resemble crocodile jaws or raptorial beaks, among others. Women were tattooed on one or both hands, with intricate designs that resemble damask embroidery, or had geometric motifs on the arms.

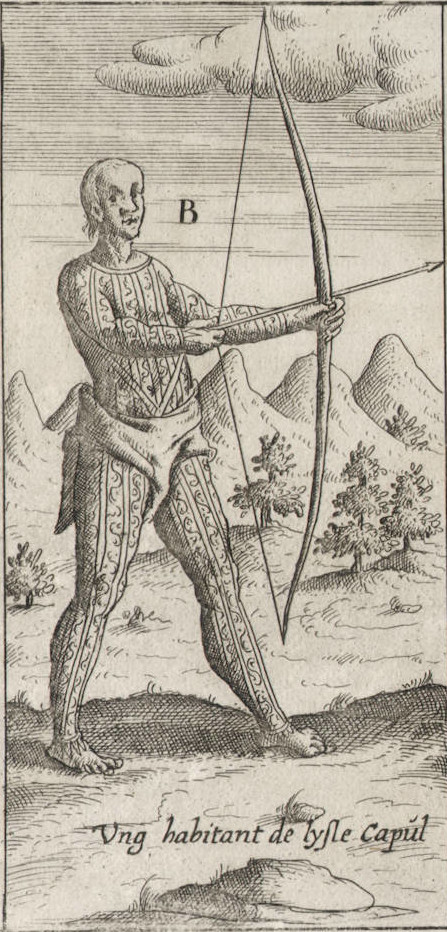
An Abaknon native of Capul (c. 1601-1602) with tattoos

The first tattoos were acquired during the initiation into adulthood (the Boxer Codex records this as around twenty years old). They are initially made on the ankles, gradually moving up to the legs and finally the waist. These were done on all men and did not indicate special status, though not getting tattoos was regarded as cowardice. Tattoos on the upper body, however, were only done after notable feats (including in love) and after participation in battles. Once the chest and throat are covered, tattoos are further applied to the back. Tattoos on the face are restricted to the most elite warriors. They may also be further augmented with scarification (labong) burned into the arms.

==== Butuanon, Surigaonon, and Kalagan ====
The rulers of the Rajahnate of Butuan and the region of Surigao (pre-colonial Karaga) were among the first "painted" (tattooed) Filipinos encounted by the Magellan expedition and described by Antonio Pigafetta.

==== Kagay-anon ====
Tattoos were described among the mixed Visayan and Lumad settlements of Cagayan de Oro by Spanish priests in 1622.

==== Sulodnon ====
Visayan tattooing traditions only survive in modern times among the Suludnon people, a Visayan ethnic group that preserved some pre-colonial customs due to their relative isolation during the Spanish colonial era in the highlands of Panay. Both men and women are tattooed. The ink they use is made from the extracts of a plant known as langi-ngi (Cayratia trifolia) mixed with powdered charcoal. Soot may also be used. In contrast to the customs described by the Spanish, modern Suludnon tattooing do not indicate rank or accomplishments. Instead they are merely decorative, with the designs depending on the preferences of the recipient.

==== Abaknon ====
A 17th century illustration from the Dutch pirate Olivier van Noort depicts an Abaknon man from the island of Capul covered in tattoos. The Abaknon people are a subgroup of the Sama-Bajau peoples. They originated from the southern Philippines (allegedly Balabac Island, off the southern tip of Palawan). They migrated in the pre-colonial era to Capul in the Visayas Islands to avoid Islamization and becoming subjects of the burgeoning Moro Sultanates in their old homelands. They were assimilated into the neighboring Visayan cultures.

=== Subanon ===
The Subanon people were not recorded having tattoos. Though they have terms for tattoos (putik or lulik), due to contact with Visayans.

=== T'boli ===
The T'boli people applied tattoos and scarification on their forearms, the backs of the hands, and on their bodies. They believed that the tattoos glow in the afterlife and guide the dead to the spirit world. T'boli tattoo designs include hakang (human figures), bekong (animal figures like frogs or lizards), and ligo bed (zigzags). Such tattoos are rarely practiced today.

=== Other groups ===
Tattoos were also present among the Pangasinan and Tagalog people. In the case of the Tagalogs, their tattoos were in the process of disappearing by the time the Spanish arrived, due to their (then recent) partial conversion to Islam. Tagalog tattooing traditions might have persisted on the island of Marinduque as recorded by the Spanish conquistador Miguel de Loarca (c. 1582-1583), who described the locals as "pintados" not under the jurisdiction of Cebu, Arevalo (Panay), or Camarines (Bicol Region). Among the Muslim Filipinos in the Sulu archipelago and southwestern Mindanao, tattooing traditions had already disappeared before the Spanish colonial era.

== Revival ==
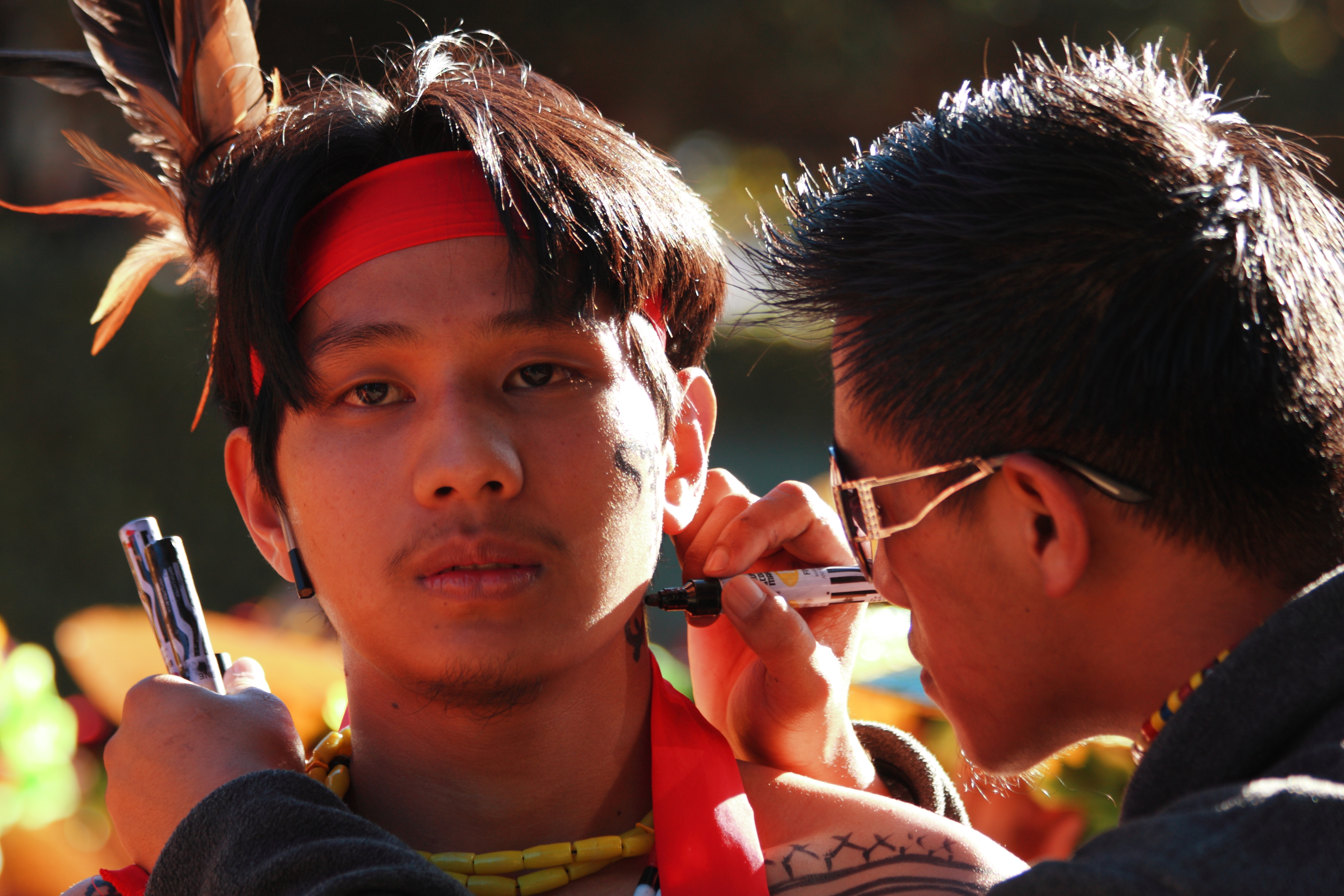
Cordilleran "tattoo" designs being applied with marker pens on a performer in the 2009 Panagbenga Festival of Baguio

Indigenous Filipino tattoos have regained some of their popularity in the modern Philippines, especially with the surge of interest in Apo Whang-od of the Butbut Kalinga. Though unlike in the past, where tattoos were closely tied to ethnic identity, modern tattoos based on ancestral designs are more often used as a form of self-expression. They are frequently "modernized", combined with other tattooing traditions, and enhanced by the skill and creativity of modern tattoo artists, though the traditional motifs are still retained. Most modern tattoo artists of batok designs use electric tattooing machines, though a few still use the hand-tapping techniques using traditional hafted tools.

Indigenous Filipino tattoos have also become popular among the Filipino diaspora. A notable organization is the Mark of the Four Waves Tribe, founded by Elle Festin in 1998 in Orange County, California. It has hundreds of members of Filipino heritage and aims to revitalize the endangered tattooing traditions of the Philippines. Members consult with historians and selected tattoo artists to fashion tattoos based on their ethnic backgrounds. Their tattoos are notable in that they are chosen precisely for their connection to the ancestral cultures of the individual, not solely for aesthetics.

Batok designs have also been incorporated into modern garments like barong tagalog or even T-shirts.

The Philippine Tattoo Artists Guild (PHILTAG) hosts an annual tattoo exposition known as "Dutdutan" (from Tagalog dutdut, "to insert [ink] with the use of needles").

== See also ==
Tattoo

- History of tattooing

Austronesian traditions:

- Bornean traditional tattooing
- Peʻa (Samoa)
- Tā moko (Maori)

Other neighboring and worldwide traditions:

- Yantra (Thailand, Cambodia, Laos, Myanmar)
- Tattooing in Myanmar
- Irezumi (Japan)
- Deq (Kurdish)
- Sicanje (Bosnia & Herzegovina)
- Sailor tattoos (Europe & Americas)
