= Deq (tattoo) =

Traditional Kurdish tattoos

Deq (Kurdish: deq, دەق; Syriac: ܕܰܩܩܶܐ, romanized: Daqqe or Dyoqo), also known as xał (خاڵ), is a traditional and unique form of tattooing that is most prominent in Mardin, Diyarbakır, and Şanlıurfa Province in southeastern Turkey. Although it is primarily a practice observed by Kurdish women, deq is also observed among men.

The tradition of Deq is primarily observed among Kurds and Yazidis, however other groups such as Arabs and Assyrians have also been recorded as having partaken in similar customs. Due to religious, cultural, and economic influences, the practice has declined and has often been replaced by henna, which is temporary, unlike the permanent nature of deq. However, recent efforts have been made to revive deq as a means of reasserting Kurdish identity.

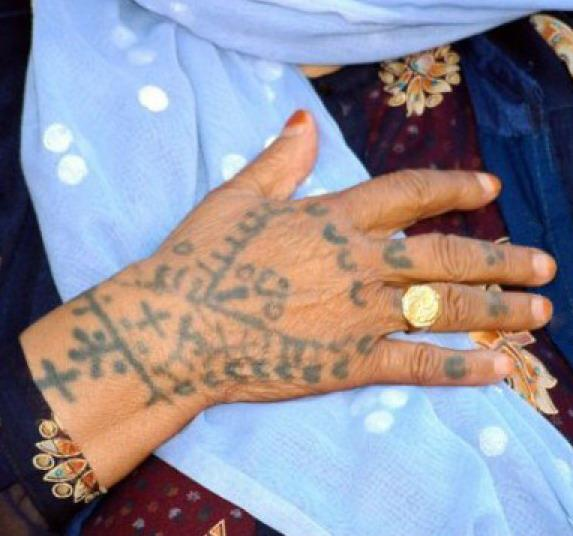
Traditional Kurdish tattoo or deq on female hand

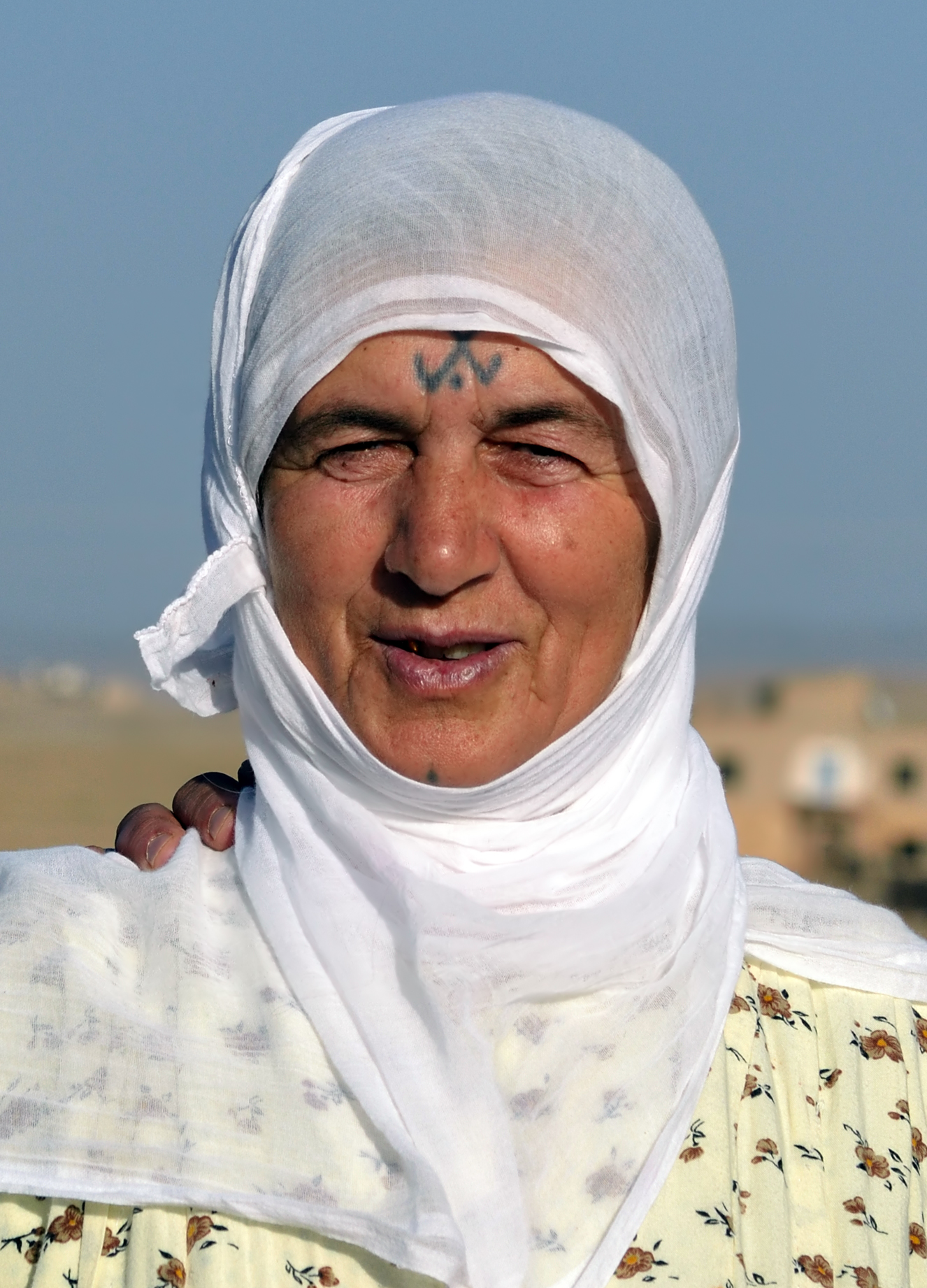
Kurdish woman with a deq pattern on her face, Savur

== Etymology ==
The term deq is derived from the Arabic and Syriac word Dyoqo (Syriac: ܕܝܘܩܐ), which means "puncturing". This etymology reflects the process of applying the tattoos, which involves puncturing the skin to create permanent marks. The practice of Deq is thus closely linked to this concept of puncturing as a form of body art and cultural expression.

The word "Deq" is also broadly used to describe tattoos or people who apply them onto the body. In Arabic, the word is used in two variations, vesm and veshm (veșm). A male tattooer is called deqqak (dekkak), while a female tattooer is called deqqake (dekkake). A tattooed male is called medquk (medkuk), while a tattooed female is called medquke (medkuke).

== History ==
The origins of deq are unknown, but they are traced back to ancient Iraq (Mesopotamia), where it is still worn by the Marsh-Arabs the descendents of the ancient Sumerians. In the early 6th century, Aëtius of Amida wrote about the deq and how it was prepared which he published in his work Medicae Artis Principes. In this work, he explained that the deq material was prepared by crushing and mixing pine wood (preferably its bark), some corroded bronze, gum and oil from trees. Beside this mixture, corroded bronze was also mixed with vinegar to create a second mixture. Then, leek juice and water is mixed together. The place for the tattoo is then cleaned by this leek juice mixture, a design is drawn by piercing and the combined mixture is then put on the skin. Other discussions of deq are also seen in article 226 of the Code of Hammurabi.

Jacques de Morgan observed the tattooing of Kurdish women in 1895, and mentioned that old women had most tattoos and were sometimes tattooed all over the body. When men were tattooed, it was predominantly on their hands and rarely on the face. Henry Field also observed this phenomenon when he visited the provinces of Kurdistan and Kermanshah in Iran in the 1950s. It was rarer for upper classmen to receive tattoos compared to villagers and nomads.

== Signification and usage ==
The practice of deq predates Christianity, Yezidism and Islam and is associated with local traditions. They can have different significations depending on placement, including pure adornment, spiritual protection and tribal affiliation. On women, they are usually found on faces, necks, feet, hands and to a lesser degree breasts and near the genitals. Facial deq is believed to ward off evil spirits, provide good health and fertility. In the past, it was also possible to identify the tribal affiliation of a Kurd by their deq, often marked as a "V" shape. There are rules to the usage of deq and women who are divorced or who have given birth to stillborn children cannot be tattooed.

In inking women, the tattooist first draws the design on the skin with a needle dipped in ink and pricked into the skin. The ink is made from milk (usually breast milk), but it can also be made using herbs, animal intestines, and lamp soot. designs are usually lines, stars, swastikas, suns, semicircles, rectangles, diamonds and crosses. In some cases, women who converted to Islam from Yazidism would have a moon symbol tattooed. It is circles that are particularly associated with fertility, while crosses are believed to ward off evil spirits and diamonds bring strength. The deq can be seen as a diary for the particular woman. Usually, for women under the age of 60, deq designs are minimalistic, and are often as small as a simple dot on the cheek or chin. The process of applying deq is regarded as painful, and the tattoo is permanent once applied.

Although much less common than women, men usually get tattooed on the hands, legs, neck, chest and face (temporal tattoos are common). The primary significations among men are medicinal and protective.

Recent efforts have been made by Kurds to preserve the tradition of Deq, as the tradition is currently at threat of being lost. Though being more common in the 1960s, the tradition is currently mostly practiced by older women, who have deq on their faces or bodies. Newer generations typically regard deq as being sacrilegious or old-fashioned, although some are now using it to express Kurdish identity and Kurdish nationalist sentiments.

=== Patterns among other groups ===
Assyrians used deq and similar types of tattoos to display Christian symbols, with common motifs such as the cross often being tattooed. Those who lived in Mardin developed cultural ties with nearby Kurds and adopted deq tattooing, often showing religious or cultural symbolism. Arabs and Yezidis also experienced a share of culture from being in and around the same area, and a number of Arab villages in Turkey have at least one tattooed woman.

Patterns among the Yazidis include a comb, a cross, a gazelle, an animal called daqqayeh, a sandgrouse foot, a moon (both full or crescent), a doll, a spindle, an inverted 'v' called res daqq and a dimlich (figure which looks like a bag with two strings).

== Bibliography ==
- Drower, Ethel S. (1941). ""Sairey Gamp" Again". Peacock Angel: Being Some Account of Votaries of a Secret Cult and Their Sanctuaries. London. ISBN 9780404164256.
- DeMello, Margo (30 May 2014). Inked: Tattoos and Body Art around the World. ABC-Clio. ISBN 978-1610690751.
- Nanda, Serena; Warms, Richard L. (2020). "Creative Expression: Anthropology and the Arts". Cultural Anthropology (12 ed.). Wadsworth. ISBN 9781133948667.
- Taşğin, Ahmet; Mollica, Marcello (March 2017). "The tradition of tattooing in Siverek, Turkey". Middle Eastern Studies. 53 (2): 271–280. doi:10.1080/00263206.2016.1237355. JSTOR 48543658 – via JSTOR.
