= Batuk Vora =

Indian journalist and politician

Batukrai H Vora (1930–2004) was a journalist from Palitana, Gujarat, India. He represented Palitana constituency from 1972 to 1975. 1949-1950 he worked with Jay Gujarat and Mashal, Gujarati language-journalist published in Bombay. He then became involved in trade union struggles and joined the Communist Party of India. After returning to journalistic work, he wrote for the CPI party organ New Age. He also worked for India Abroad, and was its correspondent in San Francisco, United States.

In the 1978 Gujarat state assembly elections he contested and won the Palitana seat in Bhavnagar district as a CPI candidate. He is the only CPI candidate in history which has won a seat in the Gujarat state assembly.

Following the 2002 Gujarat violence, Vora emerged as a staunch critic of the Narendra Modi state government. Vora died from cancer at the age of 74 in 2004.
