= Daramba =

Padding and fighting platforms on a balangay

Daramba is a Visayan term referring to paddling and fighting platforms mounted directly on the outriggers (katig) of traditional large trimaran warships (balangay) of the Philippines. They accommodated one or more rows on each side of commoner warriors (uluhan) with large leaf-shaped paddles (bugsay) during travel, naval warfare, and seasonal coastal raids (mangayaw). The paddlers were kept in rhythm by various chants and songs. The platforms for the uluhan are distinguished from the side-mounted fighting platforms (pagguray) of the warrior-nobility (the timawa and tumao), which were also built on the outriggers, in that the daramba was mounted on or near the water surface, while the pagguray was mounted above, closer to the hull.

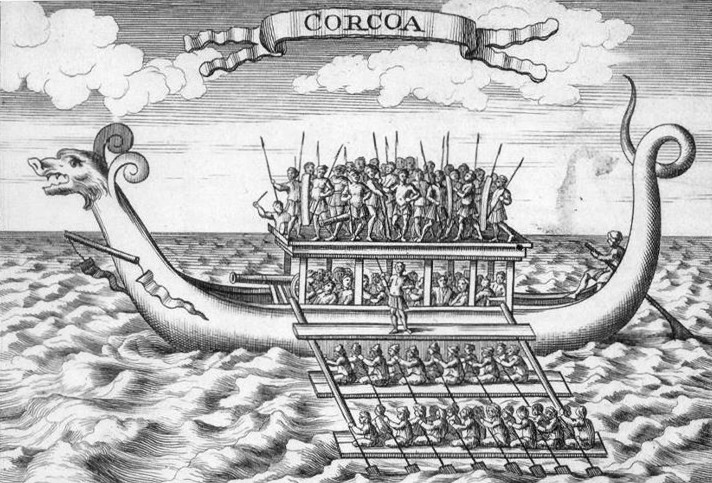
18th-century engraving of a karakoa from The Discovery and Conquest of the Molucco and Philippine Islands (1711) by Bartolomé Leonardo de Argensola, showing two pairs of daramba on each side

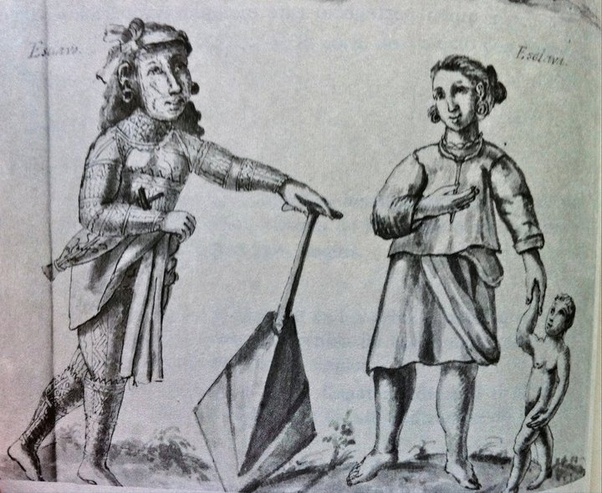
An illustration from Historia de las Islas e Indios de Bisayas depicting a tattooed Visayan uluhan (commoner warrior) with a leaf-shaped paddle (bugsay).

== See also ==
- Outrigger boat
- Lashed-lug boat
- Balangay
- Karakoa
- Lanong
- Bangka (boat)
