= Joanga =

Joanga or juanga is Spanish for "junk". It can also refer to other large native ships in Southeast Asia, including:

- Djong (ship), a large trading ship of the Javanese people of Indonesia
- Juanga (ship), a larger version of karakoa and kora kora
- Karakoa, a large outrigger warship of the Visayan and Kapampangan people of the Philippines
- Kora kora, a large outrigger ship from the Maluku Islands of Indonesia
- Lanong, a large outrigger warship from the Iranun people of the Philippines
