= Burulan =

Fighting platforms on a balangay

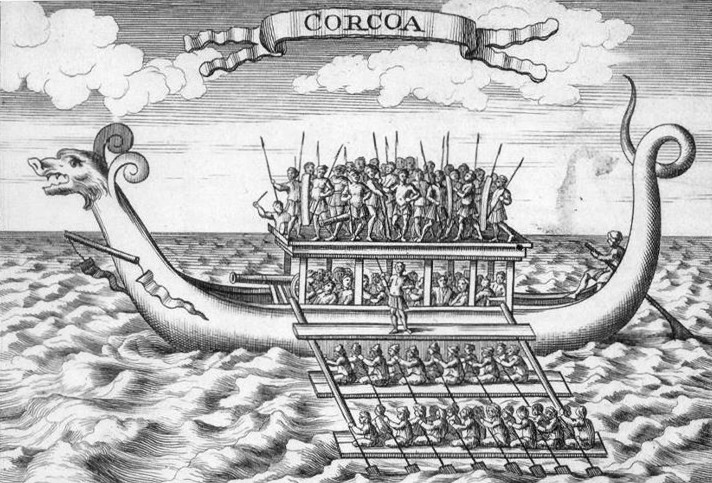
18th-century engraving of a karakoa from The Discovery and Conquest of the Molucco and Philippine Islands (1711) by Bartolomé Leonardo de Argensola, showing burulan amidships, a pair of pagguray, and two pairs of daramba on each side

Burulan is a Visayan term referring to fighting platforms on the traditional large trimaran warships (balangay) of the Philippines. They were made from bamboo and were distinctively raised from the deck. They carried the warrior-nobility of the Visayans and other passengers during travel, naval warfare, and seasonal coastal raids (mangayaw), so as to avoid interfering with the paddlers. This platform can be covered by an awning of woven palm leaves (kayang, Spanish: cayanes) during hot days or when it rains, protecting the crew and cargo.

In very large ships, the burulan can be augmented by a pair of fighting platforms mounted directly on the cross-wise supports (batangan) of the outriggers (katig). These were known as pagguray. They differed from the daramba, which were also platforms mounted on the outriggers, in that the latter were mounted on the water and were used by commoner warriors (horo-han) primarily for paddling, and occasionally for fighting.

== See also ==
- Outrigger boat
- Lashed-lug boat
- Balangay
- Karakoa
- Lanong
- Bangka (boat)
