= Datu =

Noble title in the pre-Spanish Philippines

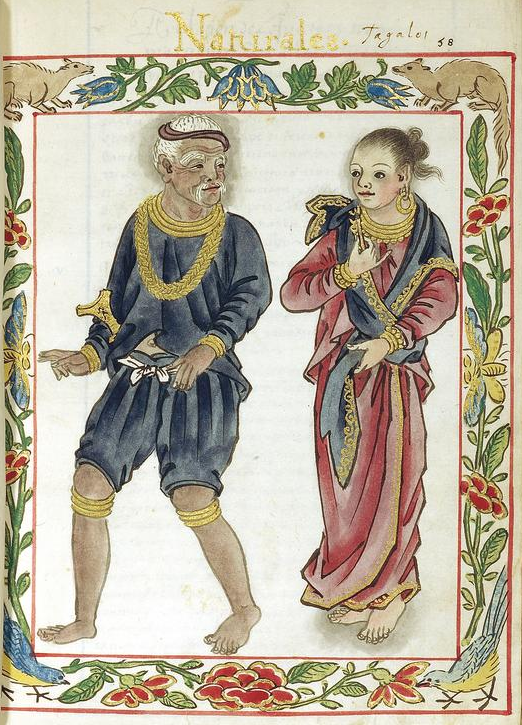
A pre-colonial couple belonging to the datu or nobility as depicted in the Boxer Codex of the 16th century.

Datu is a title which denotes the rulers (variously described in historical accounts as chiefs, sovereign princes, and monarchs) of numerous indigenous peoples throughout the Philippine archipelago. The title is still used today, though not as much as early Philippine history. It is a cognate of datuk, dato, and ratu in several other Austronesian languages.

== Overview ==
In early Philippine history, datus and a small group of their close relatives formed the "apex stratum" of the traditional three-tier social hierarchy of lowland Philippine societies. Only a member of this birthright aristocracy (called maginoo, nobleza, maharlika, or timagua by various early chroniclers) could become a datu; members of this elite could hope to become a datu by demonstrating prowess in war or exceptional leadership.

In large coastal polities such as those in Maynila, Tondo, Pangasinan, Cebu, Panay, Bohol, Butuan, Cotabato, Lanao, and Sulu, several datus brought their loyalty-groups, referred to as barangays or dulohan, into compact settlements which allowed greater degrees of cooperation and economic specialization. In such cases, datus of these barangays selected the most senior or most respected among them to serve as what scholars referred to as a paramount leader or paramount datu. The titles used by such paramount datu varied, but some of the most prominent examples were: sultan in the most Islamized areas of Mindanao; lakan among the Tagalog people; thimuay among the Subanen people; rajah in polities which traded extensively with Indonesia and Malaysia; or simply datu in some areas of Mindanao and the Visayas.

Proof of Filipino royalty and nobility (dugóng bugháw) could only be demonstrated by clear blood descent from ancient native royal blood, and in some cases adoption into a royal family.

== Terminology ==
Datu is the title for chiefs, sovereign princes, and monarchs throughout the Philippine archipelago. The title is still used today, especially in Mindanao, Sulu and Palawan, but it was used more extensively in early Philippine history, particularly in central and southern Luzon, the Visayas and Mindanao. Other titles still used today are lakan in Luzon, apo in central and northern Luzon, and sultan and rajah, especially in Mindanao, Sulu and Palawan. Depending upon the prestige of the sovereign royal family, the title of datu could be equated to royal princes, European dukes, marquesses and counts. In large ancient barangays, which had contacts with other Southeast Asian cultures through trade, some datus took the title of rajah or sultan.

The oldest historical records mentioning datus are the 7th-century Srivijayan inscriptions such as Telaga Batu to describe lesser kings or vassalized kings. The word datu is a cognate of the Malay terms dato or datuk and to the Fijian title of ratu.

== History ==
In pre-Islamic times, the political leadership office was vested in a rajahship in Manila and a datuship elsewhere in the Philippines.

=== Datu in Moro and Lumad societies in Mindanao ===
In the later part of the 1500s, the Spaniards took possession of most of Luzon and the Visayas, converting the lowland population to Christianity from their local Indigenous religion. Although Spain eventually established footholds in northern and eastern Mindanao and the Zamboanga Peninsula, its armies failed to colonize the rest of Mindanao. This area was populated by Islamized peoples (Moros to the Spaniards) and by non-Muslim Indigenous groups now known as Lumad peoples.

==== The Moro societies of Mindanao and Sulu ====
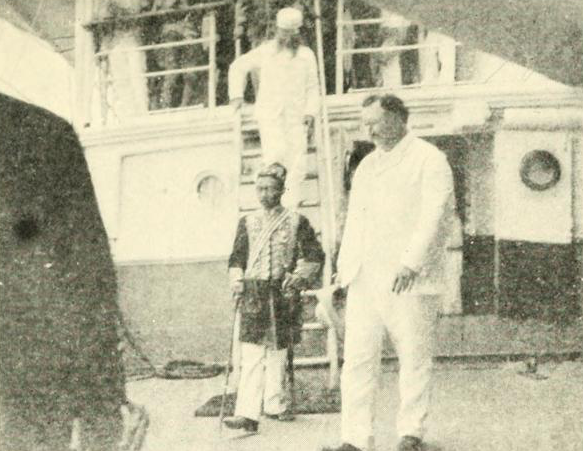
Sultan Jamalul Kiram II of Sulu with William Howard Taft (1901)

In the traditional structure of Moro societies, the sultans were the highest authority followed by the datus or rajah, with their rule being sanctioned by the Quran, though both titles predate the coming of Islam. These titles were assimilated into the new structure under Islam. Datus were supported by their tribes, and in return for tribute and labor, the datu provided aid in emergencies and advocacy in disputes with other communities, and warfare through the Agama and Maratabat laws.

==== The Lumad societies of Mindanao ====
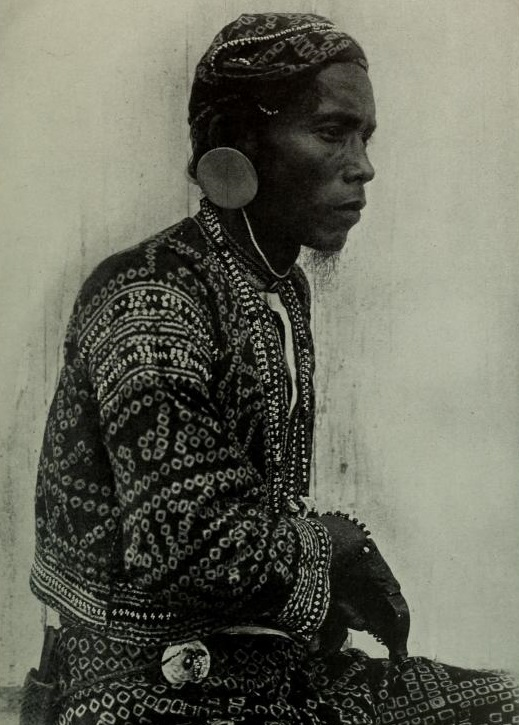
A Bagobo matanum (chieftain) who leads communities along with elders (magani) and female shamans (mabalian)

At the beginning of the 20th century, the Lumad peoples controlled an area that now covers 17 of Mindanao's 24 provinces – but by the 1980 census, they constituted less than 6% of the population of Mindanao and Sulu. Heavy migration to Mindanao of Visayans, who have settled in the Island for centuries, spurred by government-sponsored resettlement programmes, turned the Lumads into minorities. The Bukidnon province population grew from 63,470 in 1948 to 194,368 in 1960 and 414,762 in 1970, with the proportion of Indigenous Bukidnons falling from 64% to 33%, and then 14%.

There are 18 Lumad ethnolinguistic groups: Ata people, Bagobo, Banwaon, B'laan, Bukidnon, Dibabawon, Higaonon, Mamanwa, Mandaya, Manguwangan, Manobo, Mansaka, Subanon, Tagakaolo, Tasaday, Tboli, Teduray and Ubo.

Lumad datus have protected their homeland forests from illegal loggers in previous decades; some joined the New People's Army.

Datus continue to act as the community leaders in their respective tribes among a variety of indigenous peoples in Mindanao today. Moros, Lumads and Visayans now share with new settlers a homeland in Mindanao.

=== Datu in pre-colonial principalities in the Visayas ===
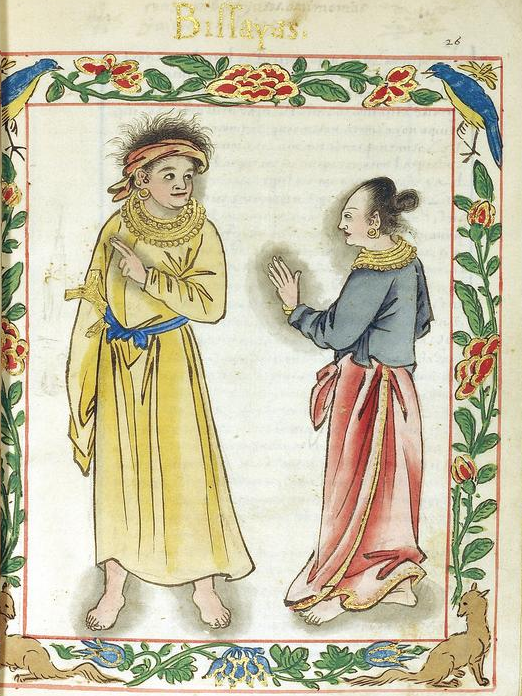
Visayan kadatuan (royal) couple as depicted in the Boxer Codex of the 16th century.

In more affluent and powerful territorial jurisdictions and principalities in the Visayas, such as Panay, (Note: Historians classify four types of unhispanized societies in the Philippines, some of which still survive in remote and isolated parts of the Country: Classless societies; Warrior societies, characterized by a distinct warrior class, in which membership is won by personal achievement, entails privilege, duty, and prescribed norms of conduct, and is requisite for community leadership; Petty plutocracies dominated socially and politically by a recognized class of rich men who attain membership through birthright, property, and by performing specified ceremonies. They are "petty" because their authority is localized, being extended by neither absentee landlordism nor territorial subjugation; Principalities: Scott's book mostly mentions examples in Mindanao, however, this form of society was predominant on the plains of the Visayan Islands and Luzon, during the pre-conquest era. Cf. William Henry Scott, Cracks in the Parchment Curtain, Quezon City: 1998, p. 139.) Cebu and Leyte(which were never conquered by Spain but were accomplished as vassals using pacts, peace treaties, and reciprocal alliances), the datu class was at the top of a divinely sanctioned and stable social order in a sakop or kinadatuan (kadatuan in ancient Malay; kedaton in Javanese; and kedatuan in many parts of modern Southeast Asia), which is elsewhere commonly referred to also as a barangay. This social order was divided into three classes. The kadatuan (members of the Visayan datu class) were compared by the Boxer Codex to the titled lords (señores de titulo) in Spain. As agalon or amo (lords), the datus enjoyed an ascribed right to respect, obedience, and support from their oripun (commoner) or followers belonging to the third order. These datus had acquired rights to the same advantages from their legal Timawa or vassals (second-order), who bind themselves to the datu as his seafaring warriors. The Timawa did not pay tribute or perform agricultural labor. The Boxer Codex calls them knights and hidalgos. The Spanish conquistador, Miguel de Loarca, described them as "free men, neither chiefs nor slaves". In the late 1600s, the Spanish Jesuit priest Francisco Ignatio Alcina classified them as the third rank of nobility (nobleza).

To maintain the purity of bloodline, datus marry only among their kind, often seeking high ranking brides in other Barangays, abducting them, or contracting brideprices in gold, slaves and jewelry. Meanwhile, datus kept their daughters secluded for protection and prestige. These well-guarded and protected highborn women were called binokot, the datus of pure descent (four generations) were called "potli nga datu" or "lubus nga datu", while a woman of noble lineage (especially the elderly) are addressed by Panay inhabitants as uray (meaning: pure as gold).

=== Datu in pre-colonial principalities in the Tagalog region ===
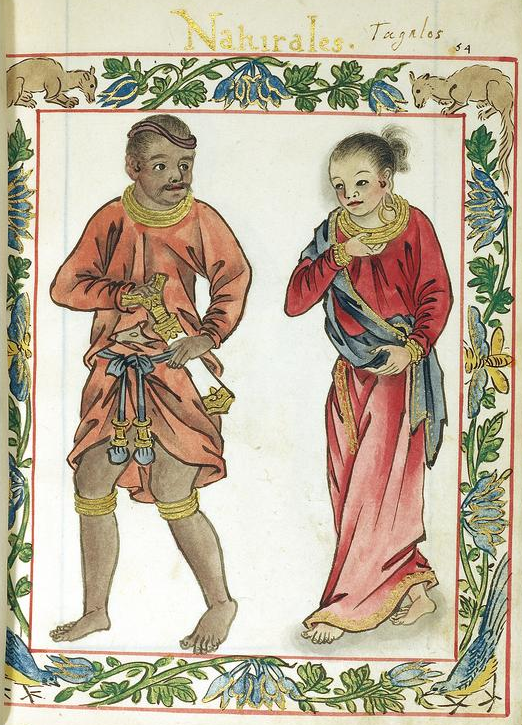
Tagalog royal couple in red, the distinctive color of their class.

The different type of culture prevalent in Luzon gave a less stable and more complex social structure to the pre-colonial Tagalog barangays of Manila, Pampanga and Laguna. The Tagalog people enjoyed a more extensive commerce than those in Visayas, having the influence of Bornean political contacts, and engaging in farming wet rice for a living. They were described by the Spanish Augustinian friar Martin de Rada as traders more than warriors.

The more complex social structure of the Tagalog people was less stable during the Spaniards' arrival because it was still differentiating. In this society, the term datu, lakan, or apo refers to the chief, but the noble class (to which the datu belonged or could come from) was the maginoo class. One could be born as part of the maginoo, but could also become a datu through personal achievement.

=== Datu during the Spanish period ===
The datu class (first estate) of the four echelons of Filipino society at the time of contact with the Europeans (as described by Juan de Plasencia), was referred to by the Spaniards as the principalía. Loarca, and the canon lawyer Antonio de Morga, who classified the society into three estates (ruler, ruled, slave), also affirmed the usage of this term and also spoke about the preeminence of the principales. All members of the datu class were principales, whether they ruled or not. San Buenaventura's 1613 Dictionary of the Tagalog Language defines three terms that clarify the concept of the principalía:

- Poón or punò (chief, leader) – principal or head of a lineage.
- Ginoó – a noble by lineage and parentage, family and descent.
- Maginoo – principal in lineage or parentage.

The Spanish term seňor (lord) is equated with all these terms, which are distinguished from the nouveau riche imitators scornfully called maygintao (man with gold or hidalgo by gold, and not by lineage).

Upon the Christianization of most parts of the Philippine archipelago, the datus retained their right to govern their territory under the Spanish Empire. King Philip II of Spain, signed a law on June 11, 1594, which commanded the Spanish colonial officials in the archipelago that these native royalties and nobilities be given the same respect, and privileges that they had enjoyed before their conversion. Their domains became self-ruled tributary barangays of the Spanish Empire.

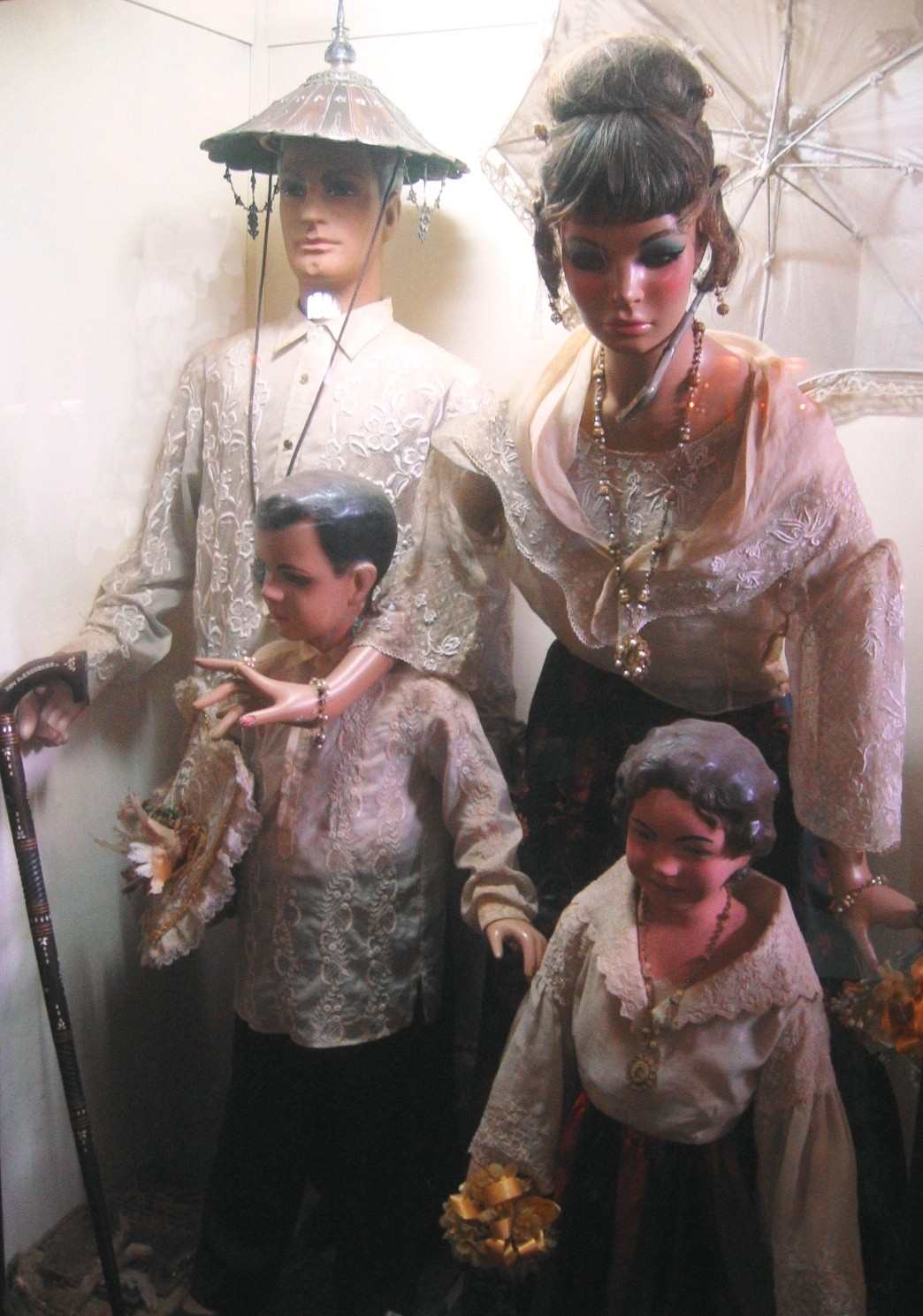
Costume of a family belonging to the principalía during the 19th century. Picture taken from the exhibit in Villa Escudero Museum in San Pablo Laguna, Philippines.

The Filipino royals and nobles formed part of the principalía (noble class) of the Philippines. It was the class that constituted a birthright aristocracy with claims to respect, obedience, and support from those of subordinate status.

With the recognition of the Spanish monarchs came the privilege of being addressed as Don or Doña. – a mark of esteem and distinction in Europe reserved for a person of noble or royal status during the colonial period. Other honors and high regard were also accorded to the Christianized datus by the Spanish Empire. For example, the gobernadorcillos (elected leader of the cabezas de barangay or the Christianized datus) and Filipino officials of justice received the greatest consideration from the Spanish Crown officials. The colonial officials were under obligation to show them the honor corresponding to their respective duties. They were allowed to sit in the houses of the Spanish provincial governors, and in any other places. They were not left to remain standing. Spanish parish priests were forbidden from treating Filipino nobles with less consideration.

The gobernadorcillos exercised the command of the towns, and were port captains in coastal towns. Their office corresponded to the alcaldes' and municipal judges' of the Iberian Peninsula, and performed the duties of both judges and notaries with defined powers. They also had the rights and powers to elect assistants and several lieutenants and alguaciles, proportionate in number to the inhabitants of the town.

By the end of the 16th century, any claim to Filipino royalty, nobility, or hidalguía had disappeared into a homogenized, hispanized and Christianized nobility through the principalía. This remnant of the pre-colonial royal and noble families continued to rule their traditional domain until the end of the Spanish regime. However, there were cases when succession in leadership was also done through the election of new leaders (i.e., cabezas de barangay), especially in provinces near the central colonial government in Manila where the ancient ruling families lost their prestige and role. Perhaps proximity to the central power diminished their significance. However, in distant territories, where the central authority had less control and where order could be maintained without using coercive measures, hereditary succession was still enforced until Spain lost the archipelago to the Americans. These distant territories remained patriarchal societies, where people retained great respect for the principalía.

The principalía was larger and more influential than the pre-conquest Indigenous nobility. It helped create and perpetuate an oligarchic system in the Spanish colony for over three hundred years. The Spanish colonial government's prohibition for foreigners to own land in the Philippines contributed to the evolution of this form of oligarchy. In some Philippine provinces, many Spaniards and foreign merchants married the rich and received Austronesian local nobilities. From these unions, a new cultural group was formed: the mestizo class. Their descendants emerged later to become an influential part of the government and the principalía.

== Political functions ==
Anthropologist Laura Lee Junker's comparative analysis of historical accounts from cultures throughout the archipelago, depicts datus functioning as primary political authorities, war leaders, legal adjudicators, the de facto owners of agricultural products and sea resources within a district, the primary supporters of attached craft specialists, the overseers of intra-district and external trade, and the pivotal centers of regional resource mobilization systems.

Anthropologists like F. Landa Jocano and Junker, historians, and historiographers like William Henry Scott distinguish between the nobility and aristocratic nature of the datus against the exercise of sovereign political authority. Although the datus and paramount datus of early Philippine polities were a "birthright aristocracy" and were widely recognized "aristocratic" or "noble", which were comparable to the nobles and royals of the Spanish colonizers, the nature of their relationship with the members of their barangay was less asymmetrical than monarchic political systems in other parts of the world. Their control over territory was a function of their leadership of the barangay and, in some local pre-colonial societies (mostly in Luzon), the concept of ruling was not a "divine right". Furthermore, their position was dependent on the common consent of the members of the barangay's aristocratic Maginoo-class. Although the position of datu could be inherited, the maginoo could choose someone else to follow within their own class if that person proved to be a more capable war leader or political administrator. Even paramount datus such as lakans or rajahs exercised only a limited degree of influence over the less-senior datus they led, which did not include claims over the barangays and territories. Antonio de Morga, in his work Sucesos de las Islas Filipinas, expounds on the degree to which early Philippine datus could exercise their authority:

There were no kings or lords throughout these islands who ruled over them as in the manner of our kingdoms and provinces; but in every island, and in each province of it, many chiefs were recognized by the natives themselves. Some were more powerful than others, and each one had his followers and subjects, by districts and families; and these obeyed and respected the chief. Some chiefs had friendship and communication with others, and at times wars and quarrels... When any of these chiefs was more courageous than others in war and upon other occasions, such a one enjoyed more followers and men; and the others were under his leadership, even if they were chiefs. These latter retained to themselves the lordship and particular government of their own following, which is called barangay among them. They had datos and other special leaders [mandadores] who attended to the interests of the barangay.

== Paramount datus ==
The term paramount datu or paramount ruler is a term applied by historians to describe the highest ranking political authorities in the largest lowland polities or inter-polity alliance groups in early Philippine history, such as those in Maynila, Tondo, the Confederation of Madja-as in Panay, Pangasinan, Cebu, Bohol, Butuan, Cotabato, and Sulu.

Different cultures on the Philippine archipelago referred to the most senior datu using different titles: In Muslim polities such as Sulu and Cotabato, the paramount ruler was called a sultan; in Tagalog communities, the equivalent title was lakan; in communities which historically had strong political or trade connections with Indianized polities in Indonesia and Malaysia, the paramount ruler was called a rajah; among the Subanon people of the Zamboanga Peninsula, the most senior thimuay is referred to as the thimuay labi, or sulotan in more Islamized Subanon communities. In some other portions of the Visayas and Mindanao, there was no separate name for the most senior ruler, so the paramount ruler was called a datu, although one datu was identifiable as the most senior.

== Nobility ==
The noble or aristocratic nature of datus and their relatives is asserted in folk origin myths, was widely acknowledged by foreigners who visited the Philippine archipelago, and is upheld by modern scholarship. Succession to the position of datu was often (although not always) hereditary, and datus received their mandate to lead from their membership in an aristocratic class. Records of Chinese traders and Spanish colonizers describe datus or paramount datus as sovereign princes and principals. Travellers who came to the Philippine archipelago from kingdoms or empires such as Song and Ming dynasty China, or 16th-century Spain, even initially referred to datus or paramount datus as "kings", even though they later discovered that datus did not exercise absolute sovereignty over the members of their barangays.

=== Indigenous conceptions of nobility and aristocracy ===
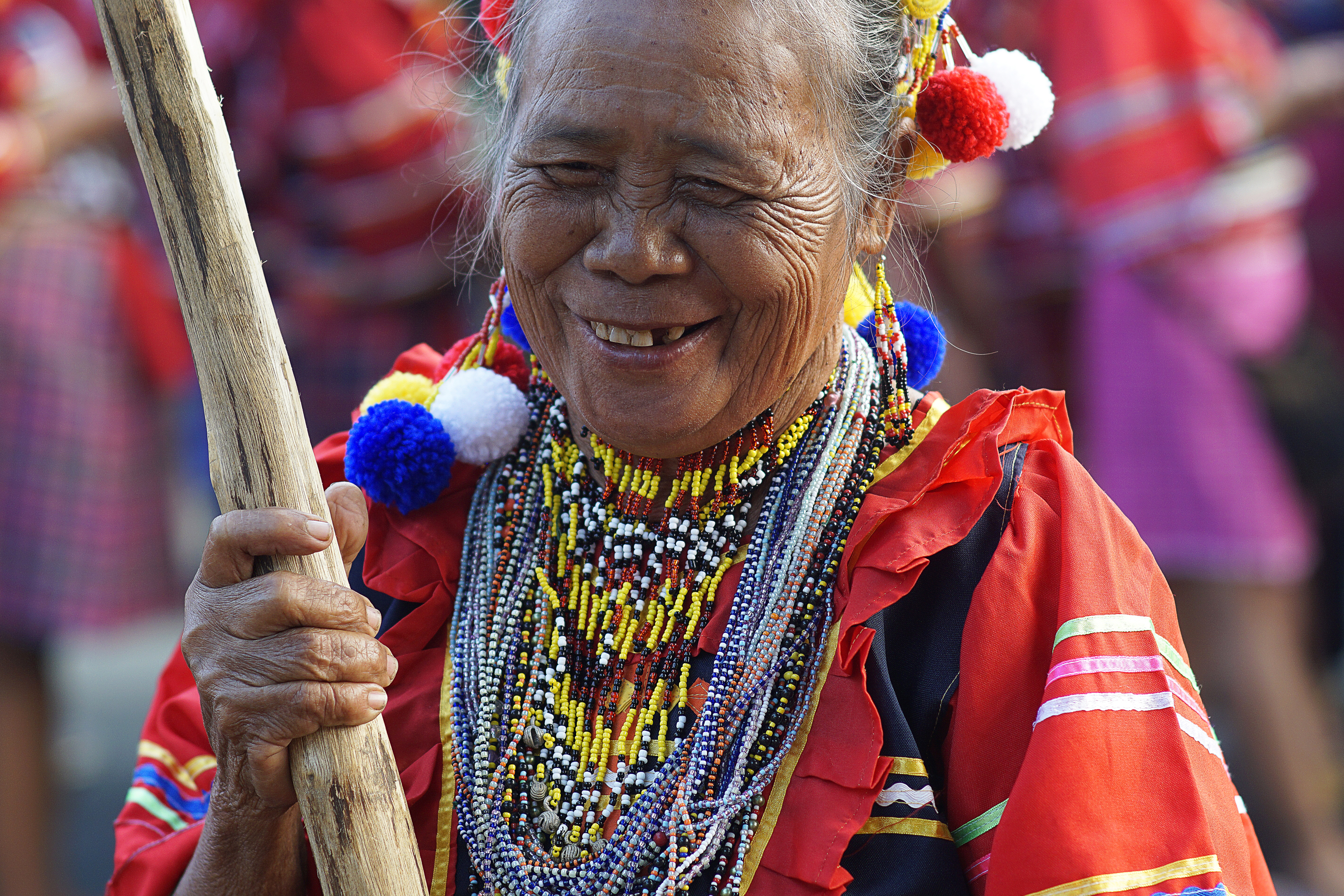
A Manobo bae, a female tribal leader equivalent to a datu, in the 2015 Kaamulan Festival

The Filipino worldview has had a conception of the self or individual being deeply and holistically connected to a larger community, expressed in the language of Filipino psychology as kapwa. This Indigenous conception of self strongly defined the roles and obligations played by individuals within their society.

This differentiation of roles and obligations is more broadly characteristic of Malayo-Polynesian and Austronesian cultures where, as Mulder explains:

...Social life is rooted in the immediate experience of a hierarchically ordered social arrangement based on the essential inequality of individuals and their mutual obligations to each other.

This "essential inequality of individuals and their mutual obligations to each other" informed the reciprocal relationships (expressed in the Filipino value of utang na loob) that defined the three-tiered social structure typical among early Philippine peoples.

In some cases, such as the more developed sakop or kinadatuan in the Visayas (e.g., Panay, Bohol and Cebu), origin myths and other folk narratives placed the datu and the aristocratic class at the top of a divinely sanctioned and stable social order. These folk narratives portrayed the ancestors of datus and other nobles as being created by an almighty deity, just like other human beings, but the behavior of these creations determined the social position of their descendants.

This conception of social organization continues to shape Philippine society today despite the introduction of western, externally democratic structures.

=== Membership in the aristocratic class ===
The "authority, power, and influence" of the datu came primarily from his recognized status within the noble class.

A datu's political legitimacy was not only determined by birth, but was also dependent on one's "personal charisma, prowess in war, and wealth".

=== Hereditary succession ===
The office of datu was normally passed on through heredity, and even in cases where it was not passed on through direct descent, only a fellow member of the aristocratic class could ascend to the position. In large settlements where several datus and their barangays lived in close proximity, paramount datus were chosen by datus from amongst themselves more democratically, but even this position as most senior among datus was often passed on through heredity.

In Sucesos de las Islas Filipinas, Antonio de Morga noted this succession through heredity:

These principalities and lordships were inherited in the male line and by succession of father and son and their descendants. If these were lacking, then their brothers and collateral relatives succeeded... When any of these chiefs was more courageous than others in war and upon other occasions, such a one enjoyed more followers and men; and the others were under his leadership, even if they were chiefs. These latter retained to themselves the lordship and particular government of their own following, which is called barangay among them. They had datos and other special leaders [mandadores] who attended to the interests of the barangay.

=== Material affluence ===
Since the culture of the pre-colonial societies in the Visayas, northern Mindanao, and Luzon were largely influenced by Hindu and Buddhist cultures, the datus who ruled these principalities (such as Butuan Calinan, Ranau Gandamatu, Maguindanao Polangi, Cebu, Bohol, Panay, Mindoro and Manila) also shared many customs of royalties and nobles in Southeast Asian territories, especially in the way they used to dress and adorn themselves with gold and silk. The measure of the prince's possession of gold and slaves was proportionate to his greatness and nobility. The first Western travellers, who came to the archipelago, observed that there was hardly any "Indian" who did not possess chains and other articles of gold.

=== Foreign recognition of nobility ===
The Spanish colonizers who came in the 1500s acknowledged the nobility of the aristocratic class within early Philippine societies. De Morga, for example, referred to them as principalities.

Once the Spanish colonial government had been established, the Spanish continued to recognize the descendants of pre-colonial datus as nobles, assigning them positions such as Cabeza de Barangay. Spanish monarchs recognized their noble nature and origin.

== Popular portrayal as "monarchs" ==
=== Early misidentifications of pre-colonial polities in Luzon ===
When travelers came to the Philippines from cultures which were under a sovereign monarch, these travelers often initially referred to the rulers of Philippine polities as monarchs, implying recognition of their powers as sovereigns.

Some early examples were the Song dynasty traders who came to the Philippines and referred to the ruler of Ma-i as a huang, meaning king – an appellation later adopted by the Ming dynasty courts when dealing with the Philippine archipelago cultures of their own time, such as Botuan and Luzon.

The Spanish expeditions of Ferdinand Magellan in the 1520s and Miguel López de Legazpi in the 1570s initially referred to paramount datus (lakans, rajahs, sultans, etc.) as kings, though the Spanish stopped using this term when those under the command of Martin de Goiti first travelled to the polities in Bulacan and Pampanga in late 1571 and realized that the Kapampanan datus had the choice to not obey the wishes of the paramount datus of Tondo (Lakandula) and Maynila (Rajahs Matanda and Sulayman), leading Lakandula and Sulayman to explain that there was "no single king over these lands", and that the influence of Tondo and Maynila over the Kapampangan polities did not include either territorial claim or absolute command.

Junker and Scott note that this misconception was natural, because both the Chinese and the Spanish came from cultures which had autocratic and imperial political structures. It was a function of language, since their respective sinocentric and hispanocentric vocabularies were organized around worldviews that asserted the divine right of monarchs. As a result, they tended to project their beliefs into the peoples they encountered during trade and conquest.

The concept of a sovereign monarchy was not unknown among the various early polities of the Philippine archipelago, since many of these settlements had rich maritime cultures and traditions and traveled widely as sailors and traders. The Tagalogs, for example had the word "hari" to describe a monarch. As noted by Fray San Buenaventura (1613, as cited by Junker, 1990 and Scott, 1994), however, the Tagalogs only applied hari (king) to foreign monarchs, such as those of the Javanese Madjapahit kingdoms, rather than to their own leaders. "Datu", "rajah", "lakan", etc., were distinct unique words to describe the powers and privilege of indigenous or local rulers and paramount rulers.

=== Reappropriation of "royalty" in popular literature ===
Although early Philippine datus, lakans, rajahs, sultans, etc., were not sovereign in the political or military sense, they later came to be referred to as such due to the introduction of European literature during the Spanish colonial period.

Because of the cultural and political discontinuities that came with colonization, playwrights of Spanish-era Philippine literature such as comedias and zarzuelas did not have precise terminologies to describe former Philippine rulership structures, and began appropriating European concepts, such as king or queen to describe them. Because most Filipinos, even during precolonial times, related with political power structures as outsiders, this new interpretation of royalty was accepted in the broadest sense, and the distinction between monarchy as a political structure versus membership in a hereditary noble line or dynasty was lost.

The much-broader popular conception of monarchy built on Filipino experiences of "great men" being socially separate from ordinary people rather than the hierarchical technicalities of monarchies in the political sense, persists today. Common Filipino experience does not usually draw distinctions between aristocracy and nobility vis a vis sovereignty and monarchy. Datus, lakans, rajahs, and sultans are referred to as kings or monarchs in this non-technical sense, particularly in 20th-century Philippine textbooks.

The technical distinction between these concepts have been highlighted again by ethnohistorians, historiographers, and anthropologists belonging to the critical scholarship tradition.

== Honorary datus ==
The title of "honorary datu" has been conferred to foreigners and non-tribe members by the heads of local tribes and principalities. During the colonial period, some of these titles carried legal privileges. For example, on January 22, 1878, Sultan Jamalul A'Lam of Sulu appointed the Baron de Overbeck (an Austrian who was then the Austro-Hungarian Empire's consul-general in Hong Kong) as Datu Bendahara and as rajah of Sandakan, with the fullest power of life and death over all the inhabitants. On the other hand, in the Philippines, the Spaniards did not grant honorary titles; instead, they created nobiliary titles over conquered territories in the archipelago to reward high Spanish colonial officials. These nobiliary titles are still used in Spain by the descendants of the original holders, such as the Count of Jolo.

The various tribes and claimants to the royal titles of Indigenous peoples in the Philippines have their own particular customs in conferring local honorary titles, which correspond to the specific and traditional social structures of some Indigenous peoples in the country.

In unhispanized, unchristianized and unislamized parts of the Philippines, there exist other structures of society, which do not have hierarchical classes.

== Present-day datus ==
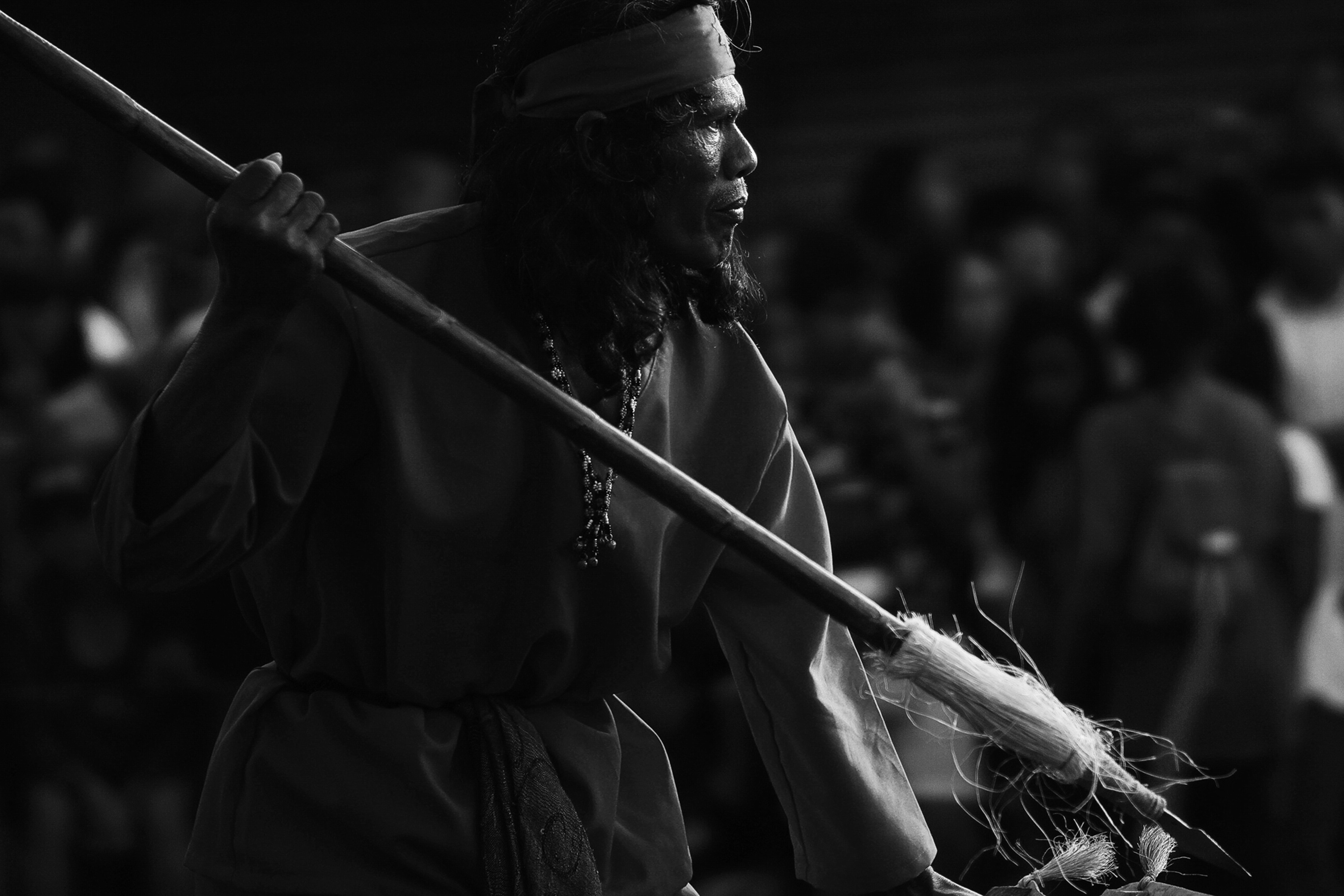
A Lumad datu performing in the 2018 Kaamulan Festival of Bukidnon

The present-day claimants of the precolonial royal or noble title and rank of datu are of two types: the descendants of Islamic precolonial polity rulers in Mindanao, and the descendants of the Christianized datus. This second group are those that live in the predominantly Catholic mainstream Filipino society. They are:

- The descendants of datus and sultans of historical and influential precolonial polities that were not totally subjected to Spanish rule, e.g., the Sultanate of Jolo, Sultanate of Maguindnao, who still claim at least the titles of their ancestors.
- The descendants of the principalía or the Christianized precolonial datus and rajahs, whose status and prerogatives as nobles and former sovereigns were recognized and confirmed by the Spanish Empire. (e.g., descendants of the Christianized last datus of the Cuyonon tribes of Palawan and the precolonial Datus of Panay,Bohol, Samar, Leyte, Mindoro, Pampanga, Bulacan, Laguna, Bicol Region, etc.; descendants of the Christianized rajahs of Cebu, Butuan and Manila; descendants of Christianized chiefs of precolonial tribes of the Cordilleras and northern Luzon.)

=== Heirs to the precolonial rank of datu in the Catholic parts of the Philippines ===
In the mainstream Philippine society that is predominantly Catholic, the descendants of the principalities are the rightful claimants of the ancient sovereign royal and noble ranks of the pre-conquest kingdoms, principalities, and barangays of their ancestors (such as the realm of the Christianized last datu of the Cuyonon tribes). These descendants of the ancient ruling class are now among the landed aristocracy, intellectual elite, merchants, and politicians in the contemporary Filipino society, and have ancestors that held the titles of Don or Doña, which were used by Spanish royalties and nobilities during the Spanish colonial period, and is still in use.

=== Philippine Constitution and the Law on Indigenous Minorities on the contemporary usage of the title datu ===
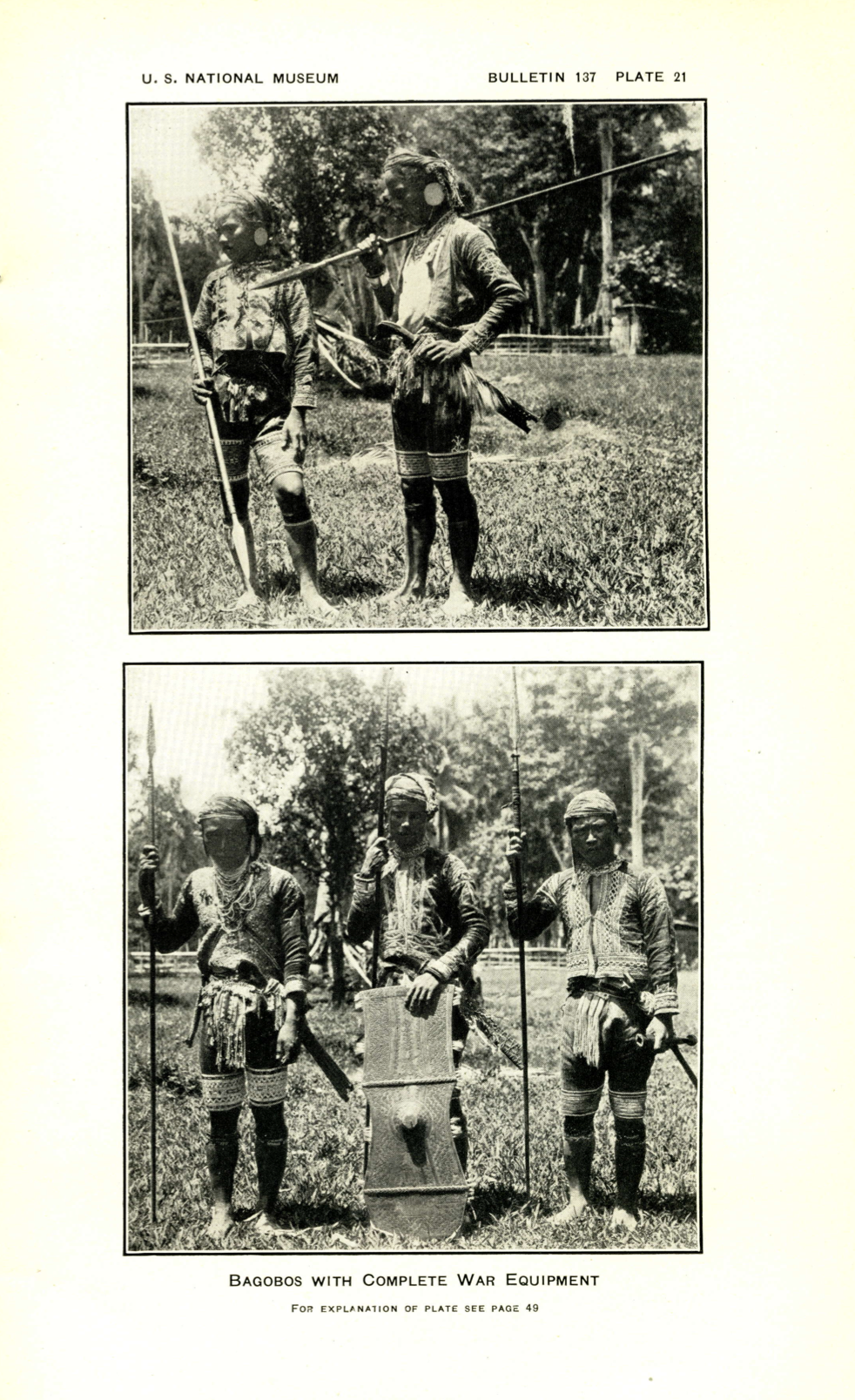
A 1926 photograph of Bagobo (Manobo) warriors in full armor. The Bagobo are one of several Lumad tribes in Mindanao.

Article VI, Section 31 of the 1987 Constitution explicitly forbids the creation, granting, and use of new royal or noble titles. Titles of honorary datu conferred by various ethnic groups to certain foreigners and non-tribe members by local chieftains are only forms of local award or appreciation for some goods or services done to a local tribe or to the person of the chieftain, and are not legally binding. Any contrary claim is otherwise unconstitutional under Philippine law.

Through the Indigenous Peoples' Rights Act of 1997, the republic also protects the peculiar situation of tribal minorities and their traditional Indigenous social structures. It allows members of Indigenous minority tribes to be conferred with traditional leadership titles, including the title datu, in a manner specified under the law's implementing rules and guidelines (Administrative Order No. 1, Series of 1998, of the National Commission on Indigenous Peoples specifically under Rule IV, Part I, Section 2, a-c), which reads:

a) Right to Confer Leadership Titles. The ICCs/IPs concerned, in accordance with their customary laws and practices, Indigenous peoples shall have the sole right to vest titles of leadership such as, but not limited to, Bae, Datu, Baylan, Timuay, Likid and such other titles to their members.

b) Recognition of Leadership Titles. To forestall undue conferment of leadership titles and misrepresentations, the ICCs/IPs concerned, may, at their option, submit a list of their recognized traditional socio-political leaders with their corresponding titles to the NCIP. The NCIP through its field offices, shall conduct a field validation of said list and shall maintain a national directory thereof.

c) Issuance of Certificates of Tribal Membership. Only the recognized registered leaders are authorized to issue certificates of tribal membership to their members. Such certificates shall be confirmed by the NCIP based on its census and records and shall have effect only for the purpose for which it was issued.

From the above-mentioned ordinance of the National Commission on Indigenous Peoples, the current usage of the title datu for newly created offices of leadership of tribal minorities does not accord nobility, which is forbidden by the Constitution of the republican state.

=== Precolonial polities and fons honorum ===
Heads of dynasties belong to one of the three kinds of sovereignty. The other two are heads of states and traditional heads of the Church (both Roman Catholic and Orthodox). The authority that emanates from this last type is transmitted through an authentic apostolic succession, i.e., direct lineage of ordination and succession of office from the Apostles (from St. Peter, in the case of the supreme pontiff of the Roman Catholic Church – the pope).

== See also ==
- Hinduism in the Philippines
- History of the Philippines (before 1521)
- Rajahnate of Maynila
- Namayan
- Datuk, Malay honorary title
- Tondo (historical polity)
- Malay styles and titles
- Rajahnate of Butuan
- Rajahnate of Cebu
- Recorded list of Datus in the Philippines
- Sultanate of Maguindanao
- Sultanate of Sulu
- Taytay, Palawan
- Non-sovereign monarchy
- Federal monarchy
- Philippine shamans
- Maharlika
- Bagani
