= Timawa =

Feudal warrior class of Visayan societies

The timawa were the feudal warrior class of the ancient Visayan societies of the Philippines. They were regarded as higher than the uripon (commoners, serfs, and slaves) but below the tumao (royal nobility) in the Visayan social hierarchy. They were roughly similar to the Tagalog maharlika caste.

The term later lost its military and nobility connotations and was demoted to mean "freemen" during the Spanish conquest of the Philippines. During which, the word was also introduced to the Tagalogs, who incorrectly used the term to refer to freed uripon (more correctly the matitimawa or tinimawa in Visayan) and commoners in general (tuhay or mamahay in Visayan). Eventually, the meaning of timawa in modern Visayan languages was reduced to an adjective for "impoverished".

== History ==
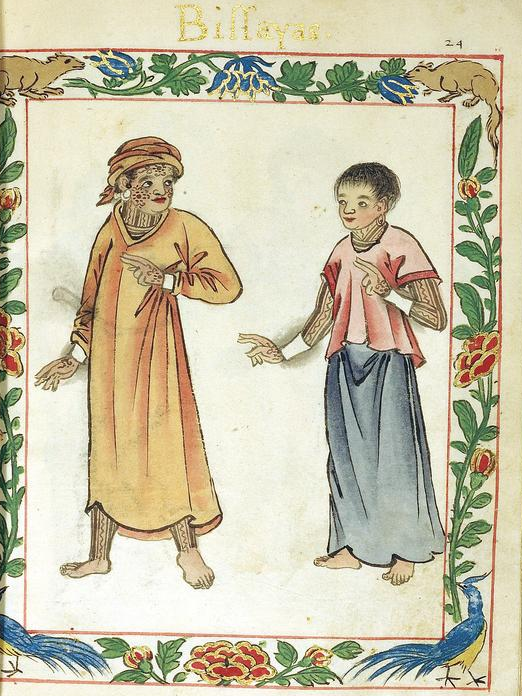
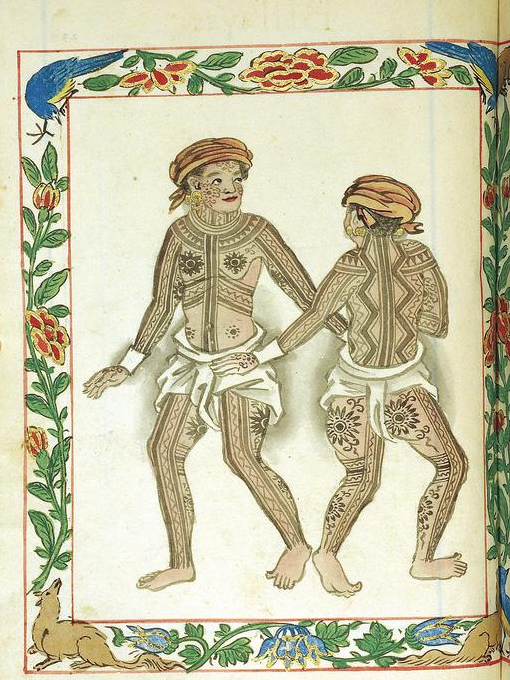
Depictions of timawa in the Boxer Codex (note the tattoos)

The timawa were the privileged intermediate class of ancient Visayan society, in between the uripon (commoners, serfs, and slaves) and the tumao (royal nobility). The timawa class included former slaves and illegitimate children of the maginoo class. Most were originally descendants or illegitimate children of the datu by commoner wives or uripon concubines, or the illegitimate children of the binokot princesses. These timawa were referred to with the title Ginoo upon the death of their fathers. A few known as Matitimawa or Tinimawa, originated from uripon who bought their freedom or were set free by their masters. These were usually distinguished from freeborn timawa.

Like the Tagalog maharlika class, the timawa were primarily a feudal warrior class, required to provide military service to the datu in hunts, raids, wars, and defense. timawa paid tribute or taxes to the datu known as buhis or handug and were required to provide agricultural labor as needed. They enjoyed certain freedoms, like the right to own their own land and uripon, the right to lend and borrow money, and the right to enter into business partnerships.

Unlike the maharlika, however, they can change allegiances freely and had no intrinsic right to the spoils of war beyond what is granted them by the datu. Though the class itself was hereditary, their wealth were only inherited by their children with the approval of the datu. A timawa may also be demoted to the uripon status (temporarily or permanently) in cases of debt, and any children born during the period will likewise be an uripon.

However this does not apply to the higher ranks of the timawa, the personal vassals of the datu. These in turn were exempt from taxes and labor obligations. Though still obligated to render military service, they had rights to the share of the war loot, were included in praises of war exploits (including acquiring tattoos of ranks and accomplishments), and were often retainers and confidantes of the datu. The datu himself was required to defend or avenge these timawa even at the risk of his own life. The most trusted among these timawa are traditionally tasked with carrying out diplomatic missions, marriage negotiations, and mourning rites in case of the death of the datu. As such, the Boxer Codex likened them to "knights and hidalgos".

Though timawa were powerful and influential members of the community, they were seldom wealthy. Wealthy timawa who overstep their class and act like tumao were derided as timindok ("big banana").

Some members of the uripon class known as the horo-han or horohan also served their masters as warriors, but unlike the timawa, they were not part of the nobility.

== Raids ==
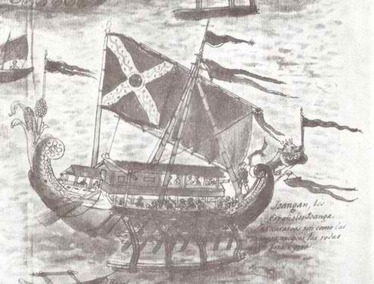
17th-century depiction of a Spanish-built joangan, from Historia de las islas e indios de Bisayas (1668) by Francisco Ignacio Alcina

Military engagements among precolonial Filipino thalassocracies can be classified into land wars (mangubat or magahat), sea raids (mangayaw, pangayaw, or kayaw), sieges (salakay), sabotage (burhi), and ambushes (habon, saghid, hoom, or poot).

Participating in land and sea raids were an essential part of the duties of the timawa. These raids are usually regular annual expeditions undertaken by the community and their allies (bila) against enemies (away). The purpose of the raids were to gain prestige through combat, taking plunder (dahas or dampas), and capturing (taban) slaves or hostages (sometimes brides). Participation and conduct in raids and other battles were recorded permanently by the timawa and the tumao in the form of tattoos on their bodies, hence the Spanish name for them – pintados (literally "the painted ones"). Enemy communities were usually completely sacked (dakot or bakot) after a raid. The trophies, captives, and goods taken from the raid (sangbay or bansag) were then divided among the participants once they return home, often to celebratory shouting and chanting (hugyaw or ugyak). A portion of the spoils (dangin) was set aside for a religious sacrifice.

Conversely, the timawa also functioned as defenders against raiders. Coastal settlements had sentinels (bantay) to watch for enemies. When possible, enemies were intercepted while they were still at sea in ship-to-ship combat (bangga). When defenses fail, villagers would often burn their own houses in a scorched-earth tactic to prevent looting, and then retreat to fortifications (tambangan) deeper inland.

The Spanish conquistador Miguel de Loarca described the preparations and the undertaking of such raids in his book Relacion de las Yslas Filipinas (1582) as thus:

"These natives have a method of casting lots with the teeth of a crocodile or of a wild boar. During the ceremony they invoke their gods and their ancestors, and inquire of them as to the result of their wars and their journeys. By knots or loops which they make with cords, they foretell what will happen to them; and they resort to these practices for everything which they have to undertake. The Indians along the coast are accustomed to set out every year on their plundering expeditions in the season of the bonanças, which come between the brisas and the vendabals. The Tinguianes set out after they have gathered their harvests; and since their custom is to be enemies to those who are such to their friends, they do not lack opportunity for fighting."

Mangubat and Mangahat also followed strict codes of conduct on the treatment of prisoners (bihag) and the redistribution of the plunder among participants. Captives who surrendered were valued alive as they were usually ransomed by relatives or otherwise had to work for their freedom (see uripon). Any timawa who kills a captive who has surrendered is obligated to pay for their value or risk becoming an uripon himself.

"While on a plundering expedition, if they could take their enemy alive they did not kill him. If any one slew a captive after his surrender, he must pay for him with his own money; and if he were unable to do so he was held as a slave. The booty that they take, whatever it may be, belongs to the chiefs, except a small portion which is given to the timaguas who go with them as oarsmen. But if many chiefs went on a raid, the one who offered the magaanito, or the sacrifice mentioned above, received half of the booty, and the other half belonged to the other chiefs."

Captured datu were also treated well and allowed to be ransomed by his relatives. If relatives are unable to do so, his allies may ransom him, but the datu was obligated to repay them at twice the value of the ransom money.

"If any chief were taken captive, he was well treated; and if any friend ransomed the captive because he was far from home, the captive returned to him double the amount that his friend had paid for him, because of his good offices in withdrawing the chief from captivity; for the latter would, otherwise, always remain a prisoner. When a chief was taken captive, or committed adultery or murder, all his relatives contributed toward his ransom, each according to the degree of his kinship; and if the relatives had not means to do this the chief remained a slave."

== Decline ==
The conversion of the Philippines to Christianity during the Spanish conquest of the Philippines, led to the eventual demise of the timawa class, along with the tumao. The sea raids, the traditional method of maintaining allegiance and gaining captives and loot ceased. With its loss, the timawa lost their place in society as a warrior class and were now forced to pay taxes to the Spanish colonial government. The datu, themselves being forced to pay tribute, started fining their timawa harshly for arbitrary reasons or else lent them money at usurious interest rates. The timawa who could not pay were reduced to uripon status.

By the 17th century, Spanish dictionaries were now erroneously defining timawa as libres (freemen) and libertos (freedmen), and were equating them with plebeyos ("commoners") and tungan tawo (literally "people in-between", the middle class)—descriptions that used to refer to the serf and peasant class, the tuhay or mamahay (the Visayan equivalent of the Tagalog aliping namamahay) and not the timawa. The 17th century Spanish Jesuit Francisco Ignacio Alcina notes that the populace still wistfully remember the pre-Hispanic timawa as "the third rank of nobility" (nobleza) but lamented that "Today they call everybody timawa who are not slaves". During this time period, the word also entered Tagalog vocabulary, incorrectly referring to freed uripon, thus aggravating the confusion.

In archaic and modern poetic Tagalog, timawa eventually came to mean "free" or "tranquil", synonymous to malayà and tiwasay respectively; while as a verb it means to "set someone free [from bondage]". In stark contrast, the word timawa in modern Visayan languages has been reduced to meaning "destitute", "impoverished", "wretched", "miserable" and "poverty-stricken".

== See also ==
- Pintados
- Filipino martial arts
- Arnis (also Eskrima or Kali)
- Suntukan
- Kinamutay
- Sikaran
- Eskrima in popular culture
- Bolo knife
- Bagani
- Maharlika
- Juramentado
- Viking raid warfare and tactics, similar seasonal naval raids among Norse societies in Scandinavia
- Samurai, similar warrior classes in Japan
- Kshatriya, similar warrior classes in India
