= Maginoo =

Nobility social class in the Philippines

The Tagalog maginoo, the Kapampangan ginu, and the Visayan tumao were the nobility social class among various cultures of the pre-colonial Philippines. Among the Visayans, the tumao were further distinguished from the immediate royal families, the kadatuan.

== Tagalog ==
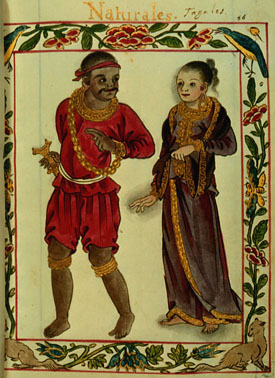
Tagalog royal couple from the Boxer Codex

The Pilipino had a three-class social structure consisting of the maginoo (royalty), the maharlika (lit. freemen; warrior nobility), and the alipin (serfs and slaves). Only those who could claim royal descent were included in the maginoo class. Their prominence depended on the fame of their ancestors (bansag) or their wealth and bravery in battle (lingas). Generally, the closer a maginoo lineage was to the royal founder (puno) of a lineage (lalad), the higher their status.

Members of the maginoo class were referred to as Ginoo. Proper names of the maginoo nobles were preceded by Gat (short for "pamagat" or "pamegat", originally meaning "lord" or "master", though it means "title" in modern Tagalog) for men and Dayang (lady) for women, denoting Lord and Lady respectively. The title Panginoon was reserved for particularly powerful maginoo who ruled over a large number of dependents and slaves, owned extensive property, and whose lineage was impeccable. Lower-status maginoo who gained prominence by newly acquired wealth were scornfully known as maygintawo (literally "person with a lot of gold"; nouveau riche). In Vocabulario de la lengua tagala (1613), the Spanish Franciscan missionary Pedro de San Buenaventura compared the maygintawo to "dark knights" who gain their status by gold and not by lineage.

The Tagalog datu were maginoo who ruled over a community (a dulohan or barangay, literally "corner" and "balangay boat" respectively) or had a large enough following. These datu either ruled over a single community (a pook) or were part of a larger settlement (a bayan, "city-state"). They constituted a council (lipon, lupon, or pulong) and answered to a sovereign ruler, referred to as the lakan (or the Sanskrit title raja, "king"). After the Spanish conquest, these datu were given the Spanish title of Don and were treated as local chiefs.

== Visayas ==
In Visayas, the Visayans utilized a three-class social structure consisting of the ulipon (commoners, serfs, and slaves, also uripon in Waray), the timawa (warrior nobility), and at the top, the tumao (nobility). The tumao consisted of blood relatives of the datu (community leader) untainted by slavery, servitude, or witchcraft. They were usually descendants of the children of a datu and secondary wives known as sandil. Various tumao supporters of the datu are collectively referred to as sandig sa datu ("beside the datu"). The tumao were also usually employed in the court of the datu in various positions (though these may sometimes be filled with timawa as well). The chief minister or privy counselor of the datu was known as the atubang sa datu (literally "facing the datu"). The steward who collected and recorded tributes and taxes and dispensed them among the household and dependents of the datu was known as the paragahin. The paragahin was also responsible for organizing public feasts and communal work. The bilanggo was the one responsible for maintaining law and order and whose own house served as the community jail (bilanggowan). Both tumao and timawa were obligated to serve as the military forces of the datu in times of war, at their own expense.

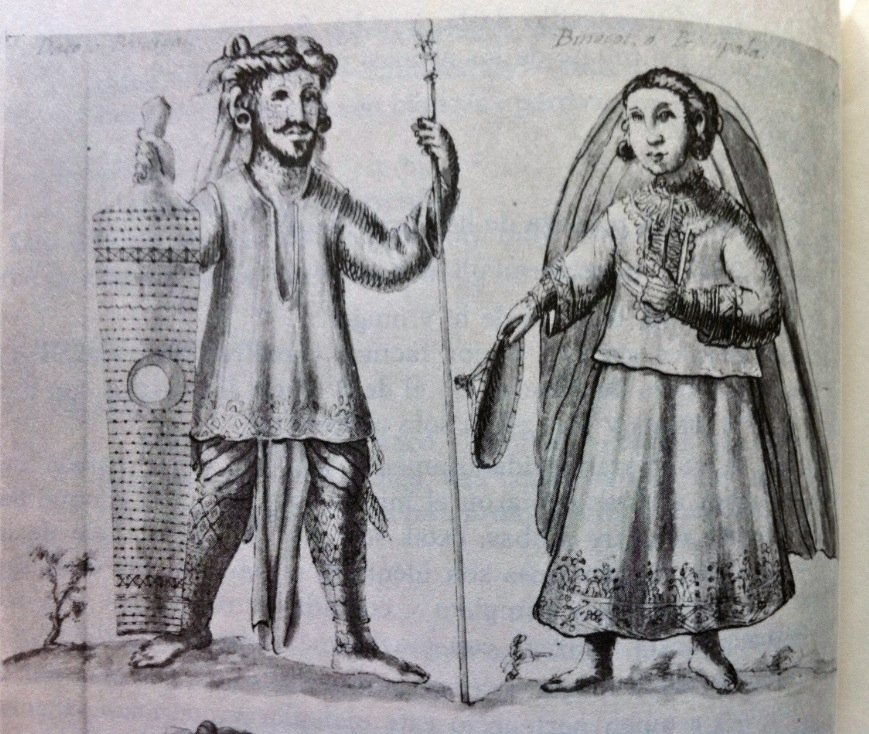
An illustration from Historia de las Islas e Indios de Bisayas (1668) by Francisco Ignacio Alcina depicting a Visayan datu and a binukot noblewoman with a veil (alampay) and a sadok

The immediate royal family of the Visayan datu were distinguished from the rest of the tumao as the kadatoan, which was both a political office and a social class. The purity of the lineage of the kadatoan was extremely important in claiming the right to rule, thus the kadatoan usually only married members of other royal families. The sons and daughters of the datu by his first wife were zealously guarded from the rest of the community. The princesses were known as binokot or binukot (literally "the veiled ones" or "the wrapped ones"), due to the fact that they were usually transported by slaves in covered palanquins. Women of the kadatoan class were powerful and revered. The first wife of the datu and the binokot could command the same number of slaves and dependents.

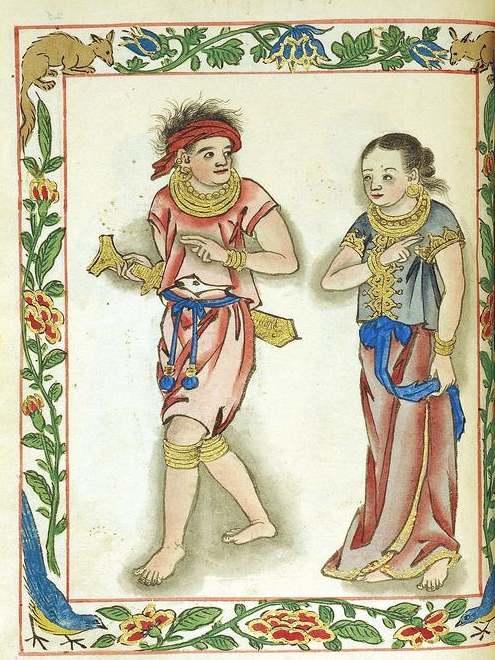
Visayan royal couple from the 16th century Boxer Codex.

A datu who gained his status by marrying a princess is known as a sabali. A datu who is of pure royal lineage is known as potli or lubus nga datu, while a datu whose four grandparents are all of pure royal descent are known as kalibutan ("all around").

The datu served as leaders and judges. Their proclamations (mantala) were delivered to the general populace by an ulipon serving as the town herald (the paratawag). They received tributes, taxes, and gifts from their subjects, among them were the himuka (gifts from timawa for permission to marry), bawbaw (gifts from the winning parties in a dispute settled by the ruling of the datu), and hikun (the greater share of property being redistributed). They had control of trade through honos (fee for anchoring a ship in the community harbor), bihit (tariffs), and lopig (discounts on local purchases). They also had the power to restrict access to communal property through decrees (balwang) and their crops and animals were distributed among his subjects to care for in a practice known as takay. The datu, however, were far from being a leisured aristocracy. They were often skilled craftsmen, hunters, blacksmiths, fishermen, and warriors in their own right, and their household produced the best commodities for trade.

Visayan datu were loosely bound to each other in a federation (a chiefdom). Members of a chiefdom had a leading datu who had authority over other datu, usually simply referred to as the pangulo ("head" or "ruler"), kaponoan ("most sovereign", from the Visayan word for "root" or "origin", puno), or makaporos nga datu (unifying chief). The pangulo of seaports with frequent foreign traffic may sometimes take on Malay or Sanskrit titles like Rajah ("ruler"), Batara ("noble lord"), Sarripada (from Sanskrit Sri Paduka, "His Highness"; variants include Salip, Sipad, Paduka, and Salipada). However, they were not kings in the European sense. Their authority usually stems from favorable trade positions, military prowess, lineage, and wealth (bahandi) rather than royal rule. While they had limited power over other member datu of the chiefdom based on their renown, they had no direct control over the subjects or lands of the other datu.

The historian William Henry Scott theorizes that this may have been Ferdinand Magellan's fatal error. Magellan assumed that Rajah Humabon was the king of the land and thus of Mactan as well. But the island of Mactan, the domain of Lapu-Lapu and another datu named Zula, was in a location that enabled them to intercept trade ships entering the harbor of Cebu, Humabon's domain. Thus it was more likely that Lapu-Lapu was actually more powerful than Humabon. Humabon himself was married to Lapu-Lapu's niece. When Magellan demanded that Lapu-Lapu submit as his "king" Humabon had done, Lapu-Lapu purportedly replied that "he was unwilling to come and do reverence to one whom he had been commanding for so long a time".

== Moro sultanates ==
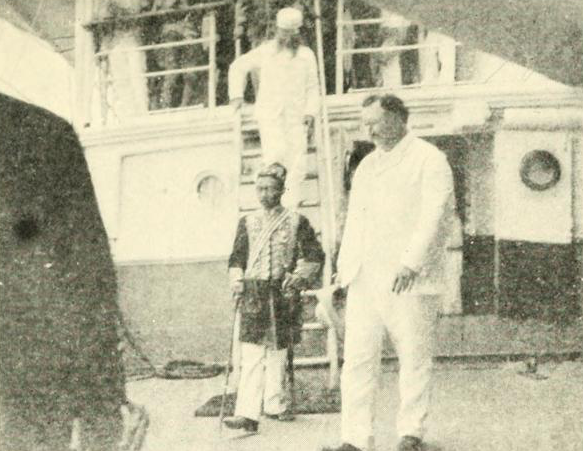
Sultan Jamalul Kiram II of Sulu with William Howard Taft (1901).

In the Muslim Sultanate of Sulu and Sultanate of Maguindanao, the supreme ruler was the sultan, an Arabic-derived title adopted after their conversion to Islam. The power of the sultan is counterpoised by a council of datu. Female nobility of these ranks were addressed as dayang ("princess"), with the sultan's daughters being known as dayang-dayang ("princess of the first degree"). All of these titles are strictly hereditary.

Below the royal nobility are the provincial governors (panglima) as well as wealthy people (orang kaya). Commoners can sometimes be promoted to nobility, known as datu sadja. Usually for outstanding feats or services in line of duty through display of bravery, heroism, and so on. Unlike true datu, the rank is only for the lifetime of the recipient and is not hereditary.

== Maranao ==
The Maranao people of the Lanao region differ from other Moro sultanates in that it is not centralized. Instead it is a confederation of several independent Maranao states each formed by multiple clans. The hereditary royal class of the Maranao society are collectively known as pidtaylan, and trace their descent from the first Sultan. These sultans rule independent states (pengampong), which are further divided into smaller communities (pulok) ruled by hereditary datu of the kadatuan class. Local government units are administered by panglima (governors) and maharajah.

The highest position in female nobility is the bai-a-labi (most exalted queen). This is followed by potri maamor (princess), solotan a bai (kind queen), and bai a dalomangcob (queen). Noble women are referred to as bayi ("lady"), while non-noble wealthy women are known as bayi a gaos (rich lady).

== Confusion with maharlika ==
During the time of former president of the Philippines, Ferdinand Marcos, the term "maharlika" was mistakenly attributed to mean "royalty". As part of his drive at promoting the Bagong Lipunan (New Society), Marcos sponsored the research into pre-Hispanic culture of the Philippines. Apart from recommending changing the name of the Philippines into "Maharlika", Marcos was influential in making maharlika a trendy name for streets, edifices, banquet halls, villages and cultural organizations. Marcos himself utilized the word to christen a highway, a broadcasting corporation, and the reception area of the Malacañan Palace. Marcos' propagandistic utilization of the word started during World War II. Before being proven false in 1985, Marcos claimed that he had commanded a group of guerrillas known as the Maharlika Unit. Marcos also used Maharlika as his personal nom de guerre, depicting himself as the most bemedalled anti-Japanese Filipino guerrilla soldier during World War II. During the martial law period in the Philippines, Marcos attempted to produce a film entitled Maharlika to present his "war exploits".

One of the results of this trend was the distortion of the original meaning of maharlika. Maharlika does not actually refer to the "royalty" class as is claimed, but refers to the vassal warrior class. The maharlika were also more or less unique to the Tagalog caste system and that of its neighboring tribes.

== See also ==
- Precolonial barangay
- Datu
- Datuk (Malay)
- Datuk (Minangkabau)
- Indosphere
- Ratu
- Malay styles and titles
- List of ancient Philippine consorts
- Timeline of Philippine history
- Principalía
- Maharlika
- Timawa
- Babaylan
- Pintados
