= Juanga (ship) =

Large-sized kora-kora or karakoa

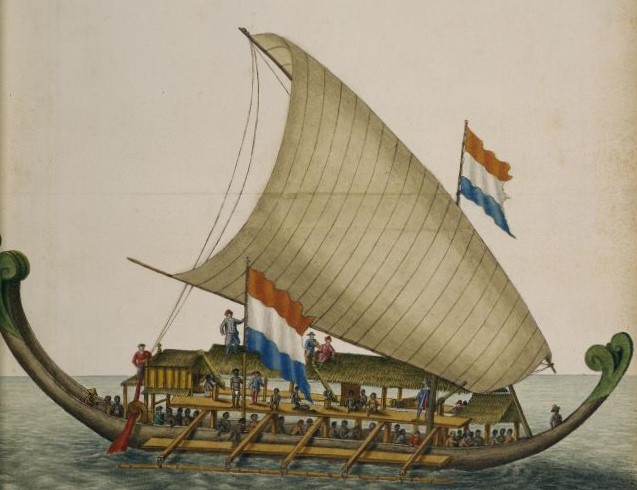
A large Dutch-owned kora-kora with mainsail, armed with several swivel guns.

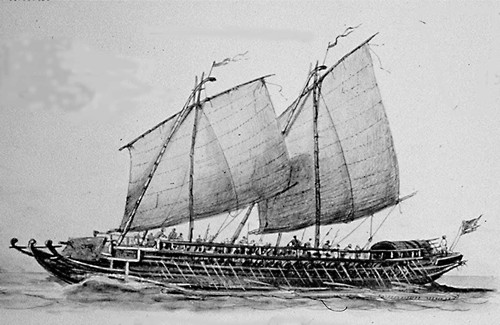
1890 illustration by Rafael Monleón of a late 19th-century Iranun lanong warship with three banks of oars under full sail

A juanga or joanga refers to large-sized kora-kora, karakoa and lanong. They are used all throughout the Philippines and Eastern Indonesia, in Maluku smaller versions were popular and are still used to this day (Kora-kora). They are propelled by oars but are not used for carrying cargo.

== Etymology ==
The word juanga and joanga are cognates with "junk", which refers to several types of ships in Asia. Retana and Pastells considered the name derived from Hokkien Chinese: 船; Pe̍h-ōe-jī: chûn, which means boat. Paul Pelliot and Waruno Mahdi reject the Chinese origin of the word "junk". Instead, it may be derived from "jong" (transliterated as joṅ) in Old Javanese which means ship. The first record of Old Javanese jong comes from an inscription in Bali dating to the 11th century CE. It was first recorded in the Malay and Chinese language by the 15th century, when a Chinese word list identified it as a Malay term for ship, thus practically excludes the Chinese origin of the word. According to William Henry Scott the term "joanga" came from "jong", a large Southeast Asian ship.

== Description ==
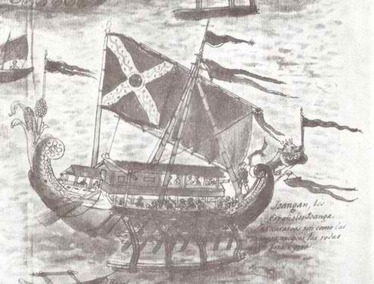
A Spanish-owned juanga, which is what Spaniards called large karakoa, from Historia de las islas e indios de Bisayas (1668) by Francisco Ignacio Alcina

=== Maluku (East-Indonesia) ===
According to a manuscript probably made by António Galvão ca. 1544 the ship was made in this way: The shape in the middle of the ship resembles an egg (he ovedo no meio) and the ends curl upwards. Thus, the ship can sail forward and backward. These vessels were not nailed or caulked. The keel of the ribs, as well as the front and rear height are adjusted and painted with fibers (guamuto, in the local language gomuto) through holes made in certain places. On the inside there is a protruding part in the form of a ring for inserting the strap so that it is not visible from the outside at all. To connect the boards, they use a pen on the other end of the board to make a small hole to insert the pen. Before joining these boards, they were given a pen to keep water from entering: spliced together, the boards were sandwiched so that it looked as if they were standing from one blade only. In the bow is inserted "wood (carved) in the form of a snake with a dragon's head with horns like a deer".

When the ship is finished, ten or twelve well-worked beams are laid across from the hull to the hull. These beams are called ngaju, serve as supports as in galleys, placed carefully until it doesn't wobble anymore. This ngaju protruded from the sides of 1, 2, or 3 braca (1 braca is about 0.3043 meters) according to the size of the ship. Above this ngaju, parallel to the ship, were tied two or three rows of bamboo, called a cangalha. In this place the rowers sit (so on the water), separated from the other rowers who are in the space of the ship. At the very end of this ngaju there are several branches. Called the pagu, as a place to tie other bamboos that are bigger and longer, this bamboo is given the name samsah (semah-semah, the local name for outriggers), to support the ship when it rolls.

In the ngaju part of the ship, a floor of split rattan, a kind of upper level or deck, is made, which is called baileo. If they ever wanted to do evil to the people who sailed on it, namely those who were armed, they could sweep the baileo with their ngaju; and the soldier fell into the water and drowned. In baileo, booths such as the toldo and conves were made, that is, a section on Portuguese ships used to be specifically for officers and dignitaries. The kolano (kings of northern Maluku) occupy it whilst lying or sitting on halls, and beside it was a place for captains, ministers and armed soldiers. They are called "baileo people". Above these booths are covered with mats, called kakoya, from the bow to the stern like a tent in a galley (como temdas de geuale) for shelter from the hot sun and rain. The kolano along with their siblings and the sangaji used a tent made of white kakoya and are called papajangga, which are rectangular. At each corner of this tent flew a flag made of feathers like the tail of a chicken, moreover there were two other flags in front almost as high as sea level, one each on the left and right, made of red cloth "which are not rectangular but resembled a tongue". The king's flag was raised from the mast in the middle of the ship.

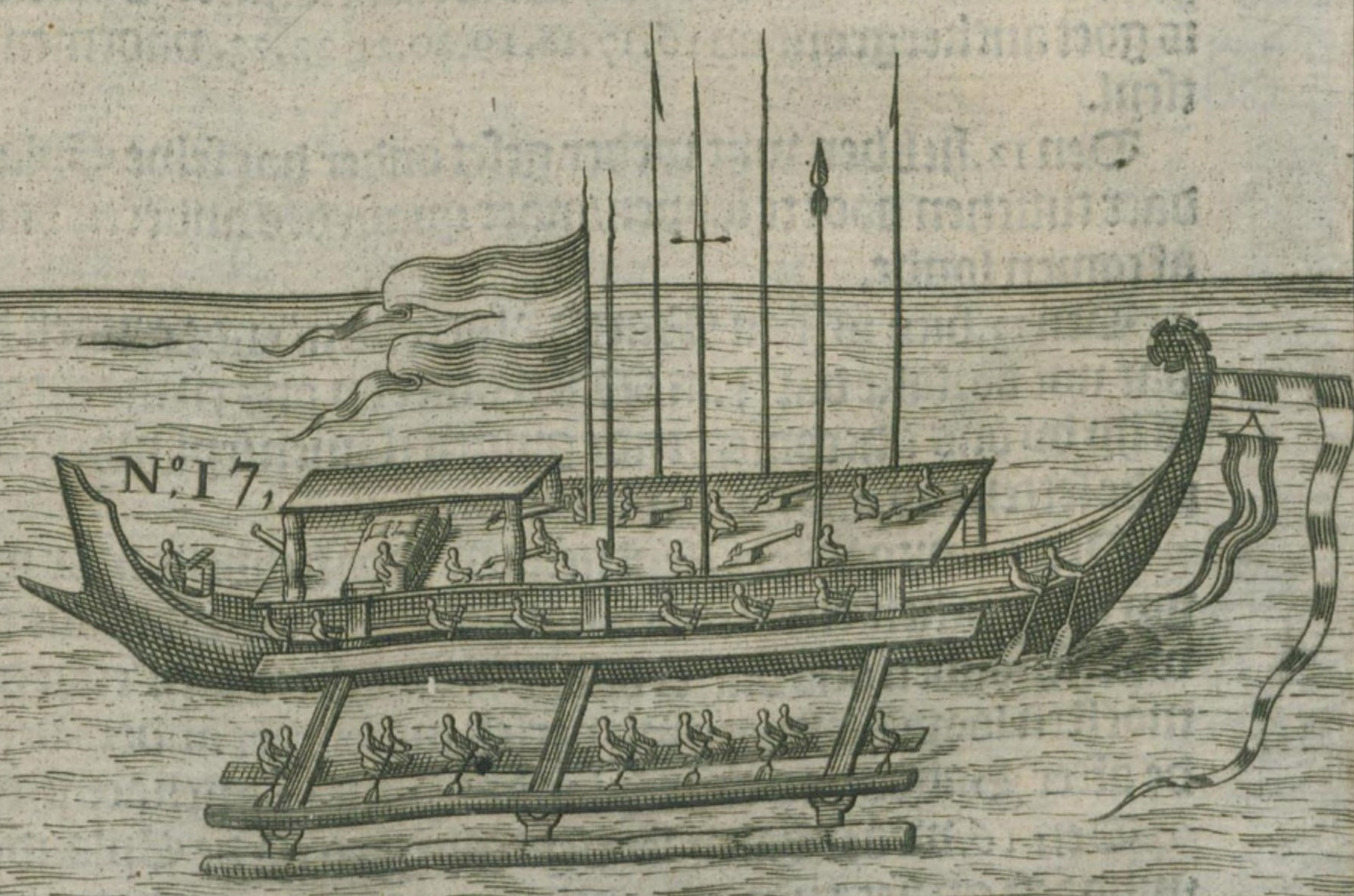
King of Ternate's kora-kora with 7 cannons. The king's luxury bed can be seen.

While the king and the captains with the minister sailed on the baileo, their young sons stayed below, the others sat in the cangalha rowing. When these sons were promoted, they were ordered to go up to Baileo and did not have to row anymore. This is a great honor for them. If they are not meritorious, they may not use the sword or be given a promotion, which is the same price as being awarded a title. From the cangalha they were put on board, and this too was an honor. Then, if they are meritorious, they were put on baileo again and abandon the oar. The paddle is very well carved, light, and shaped as an iron spearhead, sometimes round. The stalk is one covado (± 20 inches, 50.8 cm), the head is a small cross (huma cruzeta peqeuna) as a handle, while the left hand holds the leaf. The oars are free (not tied). And they are called pamguayo (pengayuh—rowers). The wood is also used as a dinner plate and a place to cut any item (servem de comer neles e d'al qualquer cousa em hum trimcho). The sails are made of burlap or from mats.

According to the same manuscript, in Maluku there are many types of ships, the most important of which is called the juanga, which resembles a royal galley (guales reaes). There are also other ships called lakafuru, kora-kora, kalulus, and small boats. Each of them is driven by oars and is not used for carrying loads, the space is long but not deep, a juanga can carry 200 oars per hull side, plus nearly 100 baileo men (e mais perto de cemhomens de baileu). However, there are also smaller juanga carrying only 150 paddlers per side and 50 people on Balieo, some are even smaller. Usually juanga, lakafuru, and kora-kora carried 1–3 boats, but in case of danger these boats may be discarded onto the sea.

=== Philippines ===
The Spanish priest Francisco Combés described karakoa in great detail in 1667. He was also impressed by the speed and craftsmanship of the vessels, remarking:

"That care and attention, which govern their boat-building, cause their ships to sail like birds, while ours are like lead in this regard."

— Francisco Combés, Historia de las islas de Mindanao, Iolo y sus adyacentes (1667)

Like other outrigger vessels, karakoa had very shallow drafts, allowing them to navigate right up to the shoreline. The hull was long and narrow and was made from lightweight materials. The entire vessel can be dragged ashore when not in use or to protect it from storms.

Karakoa can reach up to 25 metres (82 ft) in length. Very large karakoa can seat up to a hundred rowers on each side and dozens warriors on the burulan. Vessels of this size were usually royal flagships and were (inaccurately) referred to by the Spanish as joangas or juangas (sing. joanga, Spanish for "junk", native dyong or adyong).

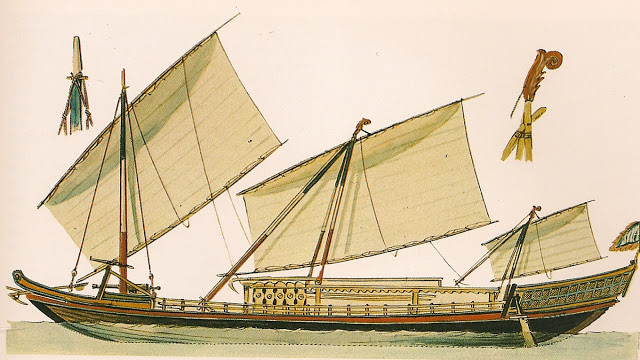
Colored detail of a lanong by Rafael Monleón

Lanong can reach up to 30 m (98 ft) long and 6 m (20 ft) wide amidships. They were crewed by up to 150 to 200 men, led by a panglima (commander). Unlike the similar karakoa, the lanong were heavily armed specifically for naval battles. The prow jutted past the keel into a beakhead that also mounted a long gun (lela) and several swivel guns (lantaka).

At the end of 18th century, Iranun people generally cruised in squadrons of 30 to 40 lanong (joanga) with a single fleet commander and a nakodah on board each joanga. There were also many warriors of various ethnic groups and, if required slaves. In addition to the rowers and crew, every joanga carried a complement of warriors numbering upward of 100 in the largest vessels. The warrior took no part in sailing the ship, and were there simply to fight and engage the enemy vessel. They were will be attacking with grappling poles, boarding lances, muskets and the kampilan. The commander of the marines had no direct say over the sailing of the raiding ship, but he was a superior officer and made decisions in consultation with the nakodah about whether or not to attack a coastal settlement or engage a passing vessel.

== History ==
=== Maluku (East-Indonesia) ===
Juanga was first recorded in a Portuguese manuscript on the history of Maluku, which was probably written by António Galvão in about 1544 published by H. Jacobs, S. J. It contains description of how the people in (North) Maluku build their ships. Juanga is used by Sultan Khairun of Ternate for transporting troops in Ternate-Portuguese conflicts between 1530 and 1570.

After a rebellion in Tidore ended in 1722, Patani and Maba people who fled to Galela since 1720 were moved to Salawati in the Raja Ampat islands using a total of 30 juanga. On July 4, 1726, 17 juanga and 6 large boats loaded with Papuan and Patani people docked in front of the Oranje fort and landed in a Malay settlement beside the fort. From here the Papuan and Patani people walked to the palace of the Sultan of Ternate to report the various treatments they had experienced from high-ranking officials of the Tidore Sultanate. The VOC (Dutch East India Company) sent officials to talk the defectors. To VOC officials the Papuans and Patani expressed their desire to become subordinates of the Sultanate of Ternate and the company. They also demanded to be treated as refugees and guaranteed their safety. Prince Nuku in 1804 used juanga in his revolt against the Dutch (c. 1780–1810), for mobilizing troops to attack North Halmahera.

=== Philippines ===
Karakoa were an integral part of the traditional sea raiding (mangayaw) of Filipino thalassocracies. They were maritime expeditions (usually seasonal) against enemy villages for the purposes of gaining prestige through combat, taking plunder, and capturing slaves or hostages (sometimes brides).

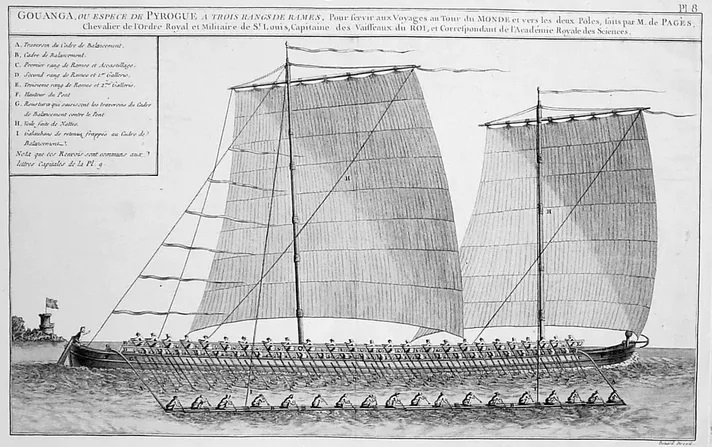
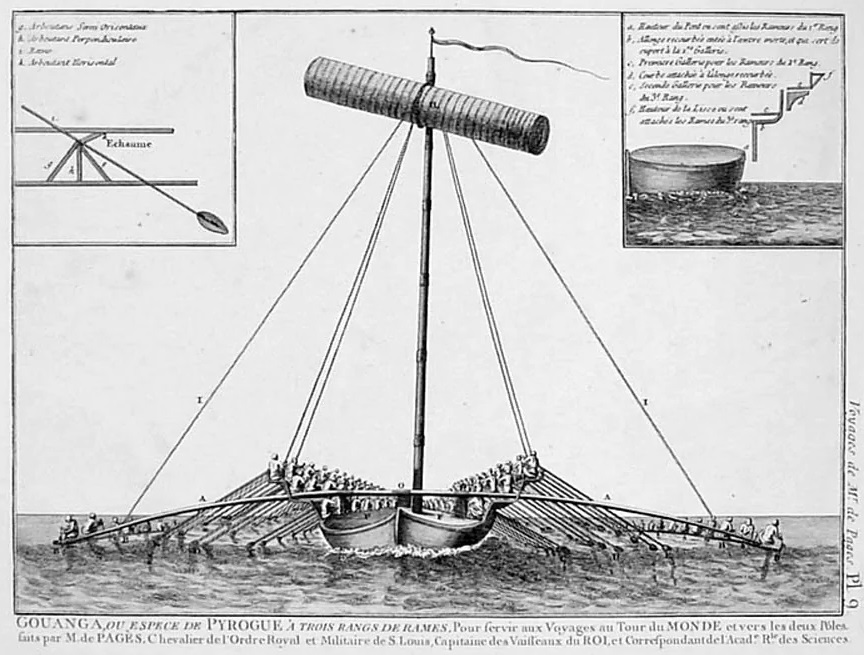
Joanga of Philippines, 1767.

Lanong could sail long distances and attacked ships as far as the Straits of Malacca and Java. They became notorious from the mid-18th century to the early 19th century for the raids and piracy (magooray) in most of Southeast Asia. This was spurred by the rising demand for slave labor in the Dutch East Indies as well as growing enmity between the Moro Sultanates and the European colonial powers. Each year, Dutch, Spanish, and English colonies in the region were warned of the "pirate wind", from August to September, when the Iranun and Banguingui ships would traditionally start raiding. From 1774 to 1794, it is estimated that around 100 to 200 ships were launched annually from the Sulu Sea to raid the surrounding areas. The raids were either mounted independently or under the orders of the Sultanate of Sulu and the Sultanate of Maguindanao, whom the Iranun and Banguingui were subjects of.

== See also ==
- Jong, also called juanga in eastern side of Indonesia.
- Lanong, a vessel occasionally referred to as joanga or juanga.
