= Kora kora =

Traditional Indonesian canoe

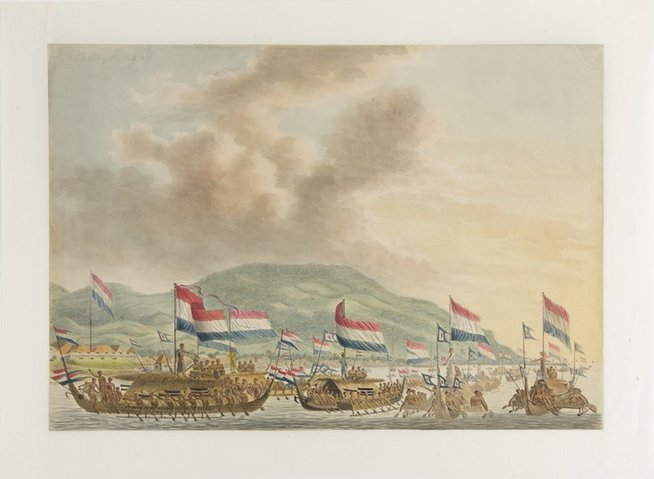
Kora-kora fleet from Ternate and Tidore bound for Ambon. 1817.

A kora-kora or kora kora or coracora is a traditional canoe from the Maluku (Moluccas) Islands, Indonesia. They are naval boat for carrying men on raids for plunder or for slaves. In Maritime Southeast Asia, raiding for slaves was an honourable way of making a living, and the kora kora was needed for defence against raids as well as for forays. Large kora-kora is called juanga or joanga.

== Etymology ==
The origin of the name is unknown, but it has been proposed that it may have been derived from the Arabic "قُرقور" qorqora, the plural of qarâqir, meaning "large merchant ship". It is also likely that the origin of the names are native, with the meaning lost through time, as other Austronesian vessels with no contact with Arab traders also bear similar names like the Ivatan karakuhan and the Marshallese korkor. The term may also comes from Spanish or Portuguese carraca, but in the oldest Portuguese and Spanish accounts of the Moluccas reports caracora, coracora, carcoa, but never carraca. De Morga not only says expressly that it is a word used by the Tagalog people of Mindoro, Marinduque, and Luzon, but that it is also a true Malayo-Polynesian word: In the Malay Peninsula: kolek (a small fishing boat); Amboina: kolekole, Mota (Banks Islands): kora, San Cristoval (South Solomons): ora.

== Descriptions ==
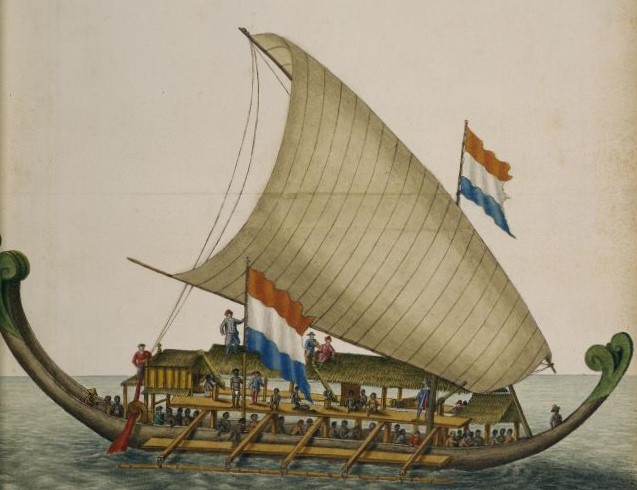
A Dutch kora-kora with mainsail.

It is approximately ten metres long and very narrow, quite open, very low, and weighs about four tons. It had outriggers of bamboo about five feet off each side, which supported a bamboo platform extending the whole length of the vessel. On the extreme outside of this sit the twenty rowers (overall it needs 40 paddlers), while within was a convenient passage fore and aft. The middle portion of the boat is covered with a thatch-house, in which baggage and passengers are stowed. The gunwale is not more than a foot above water, and suffer the great top and side weight.

This boat is used for both trade and warfare. Bigger kora-koras were used as war vessels during the war with the Dutch in the Banda Islands during the 17th century. Since ancient times the steerer and paddlers of these traditional Moluccan rowing boats yelled "Mena Muria", to synchronise their strokes during off shore expeditions. This literally means 'Front - Back', but is also translated to "I go - We follow" or "One for all - All for One".

Some of the bigger rowing boats could have over 100 rowers and when used on the maritime war path, during for instance a so-called hongitocht (war expeditions for the Dutch East India Company during the 17th century), the approach of the kora kora struck fear in the hearts of the villagers from the attacked coastal village.

According to Robert Dick-Read, every leader in the Maluku region has its own ship, the leader's status depends on the number of slaves, who come from a distant island, which he captures and collects. Each ship is rowed by 300 rowers, supported by men armed with spears, blowgun, arrows, and swords in a higher fighting platform called balai. The vessel has two steering wheels on the side, a tall pole in the stern and bow that decorated with ribbons. In the past, these poles were adorned with conquered enemy heads.

== In popular culture ==
Kora-Kora, a swinging ship ride in Dunia Fantasi theme park at Ancol Dreamland, Jakarta is named after the canoe, and become the metonym of any such ride in Indonesia.

== Gallery ==
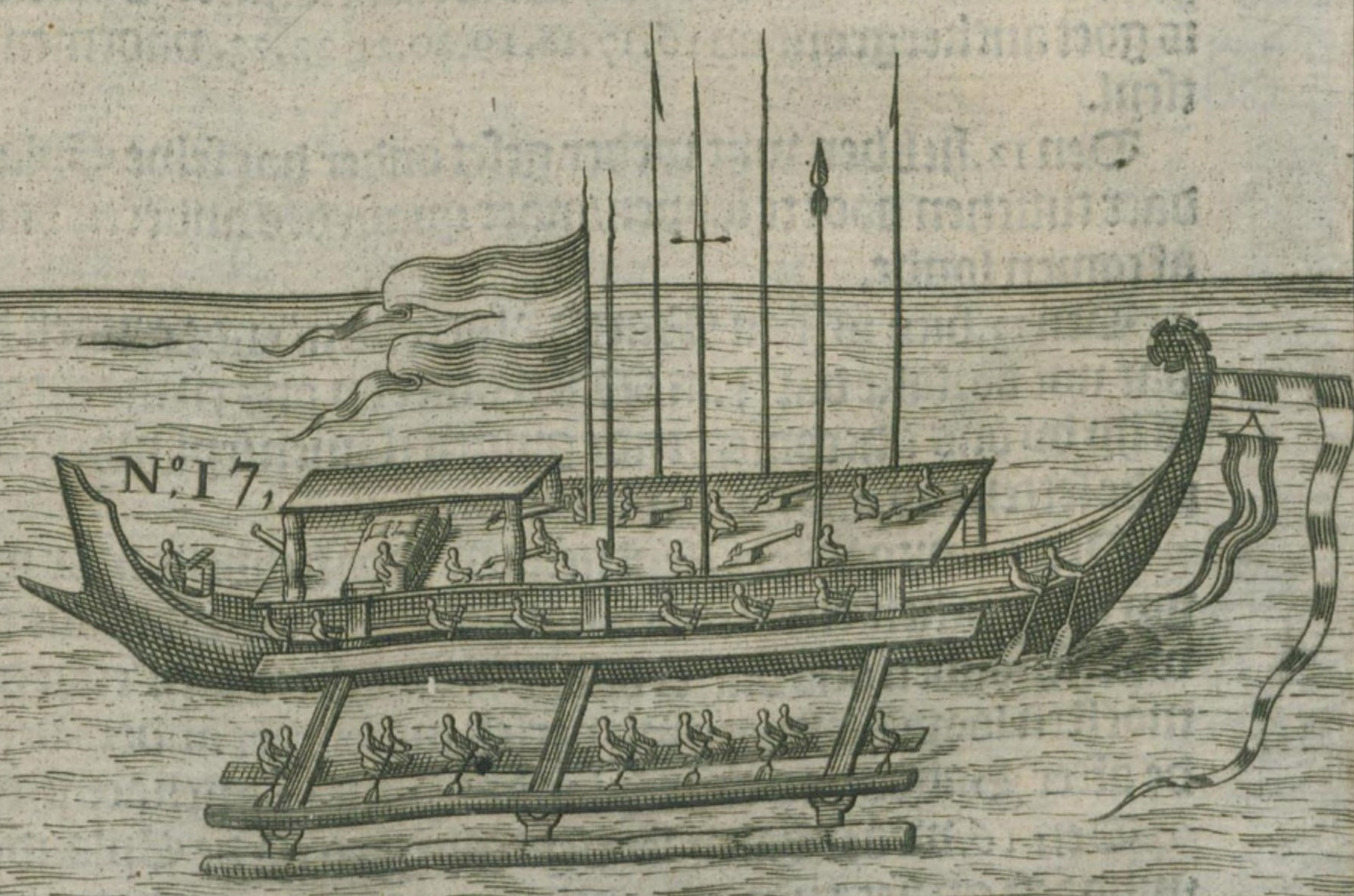
King of Ternate's kora-kora with 7 cannons. The king's luxury bed can be seen.

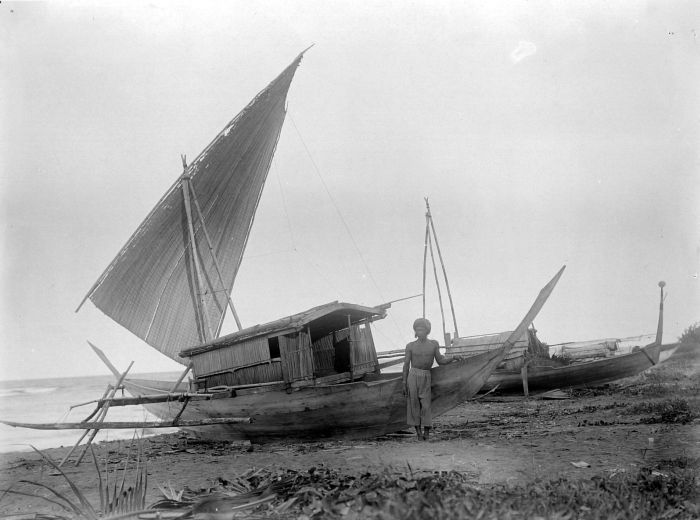
A kora-kora from Halmahera, Maluku Islands (c. 1920) with a tanja sail

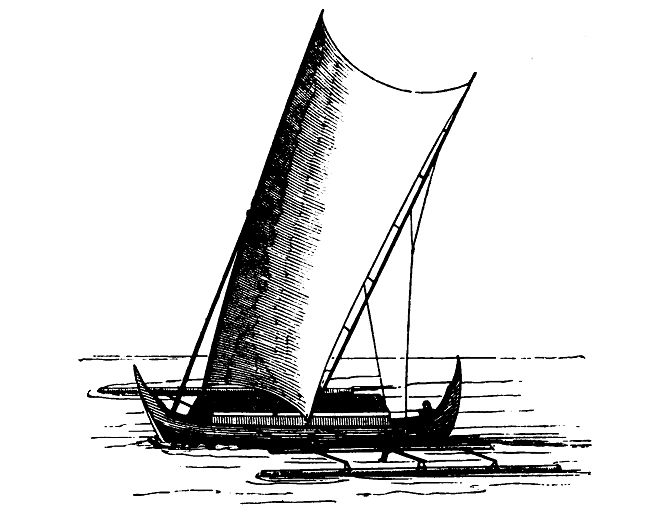
1863 illustration of a kora-kora warship in Maluku

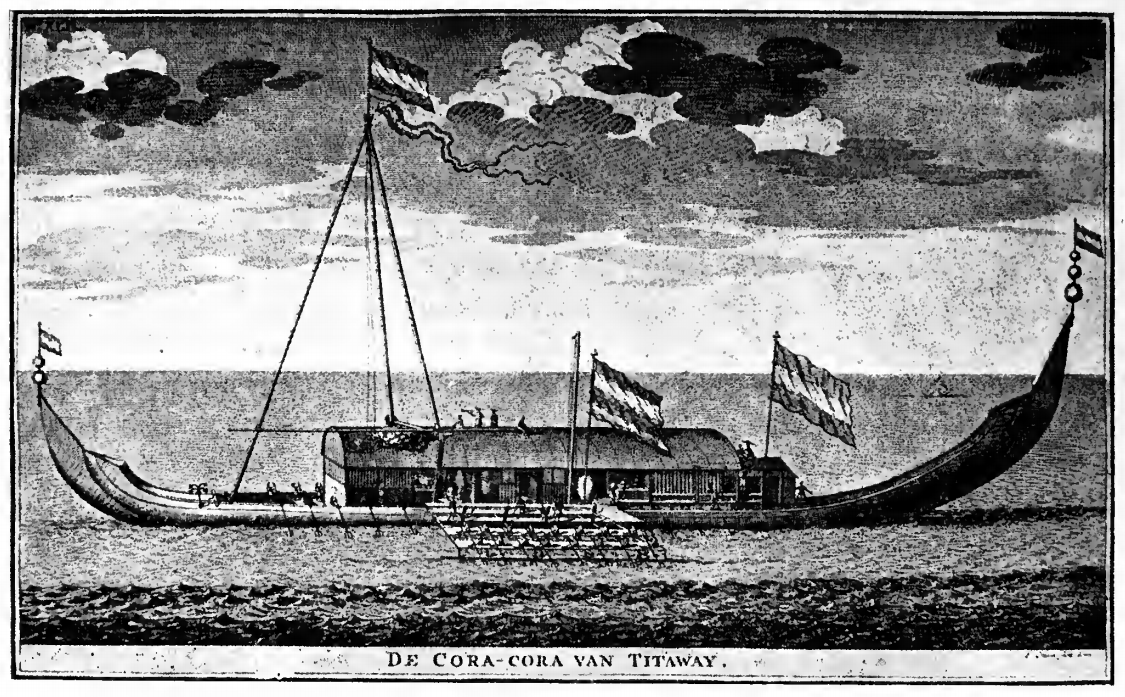
A 1726 depiction of a large kora-kora from Nusa Laut

== See also ==
- Orembai
- Karakoa, similar warships from the Philippines
- Borobudur ship
- Pinisi
- Kakap
- Culture of Indonesia
