= Lanong =

Type of warship from the Philippines

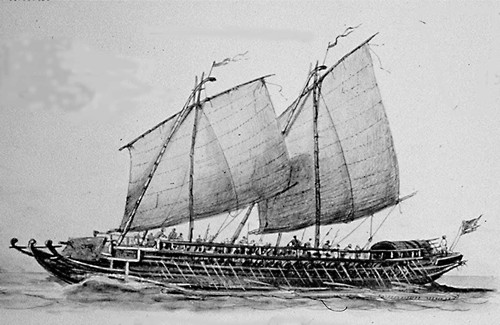
1890 illustration by Rafael Monleón of a late 19th-century Iranun lanong warship with three banks of oars under full sail

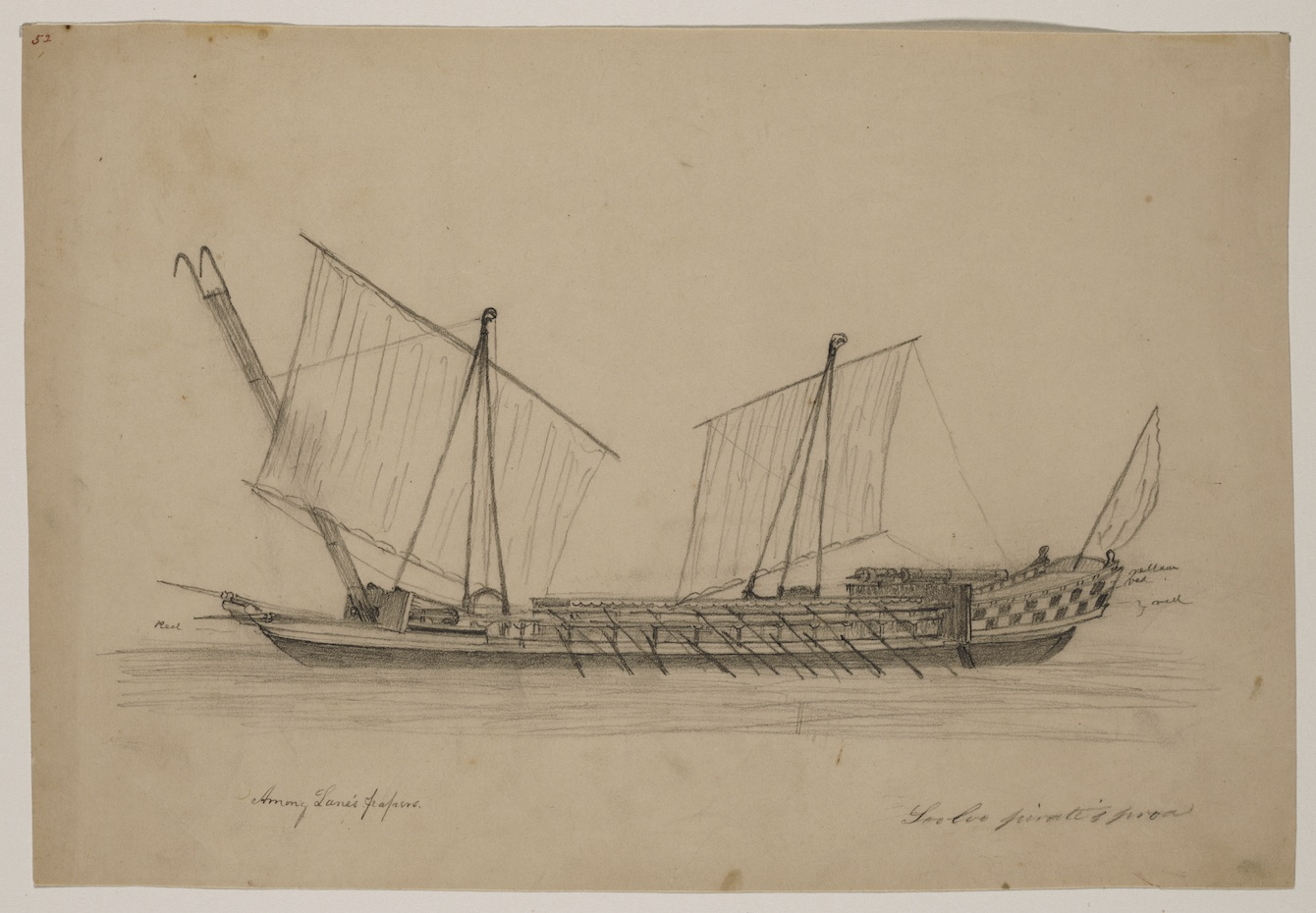
Sketch of a lanong used by Sulu pirates with a boarding platform (c. 1850)

Lanong were large outrigger warships used by the Iranun and the Banguingui people of the Philippines. They could reach up to 30 m (98 ft) in length and had two biped shear masts which doubled as boarding ladders. They also had one to three banks of oars rowed by galley slaves. They were specialized for naval battles. They were prominently used for piracy and slave raids from the mid-18th century to the early 19th century in most of Southeast Asia. The name lanong is derived from Lanun, (Note: Lanun also became the word for "pirate" in the Malay language) an exonym of the Iranun people.

Like the karakoa, large lanong were also known by the Spanish as joanga or juanga (Spanish for "junk"), a name which was also applied to other large ships in Southeast Asia.

== Description ==
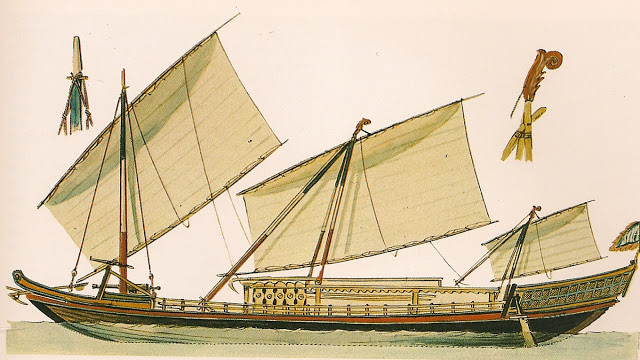
Colored detail of a lanong by Rafael Monleón

Lanong can reach up to 30 m (98 ft) long and 6 m (20 ft) wide amidships. They were crewed by up to 150 to 200 men, led by a panglima (commander). Unlike the similar karakoa, the lanong were heavily armed specifically for naval battles. The prow jutted past the keel into a beakhead that also mounted a long gun (lela) and several swivel guns (lantaka).

Lanong had two biped shear masts which were composed of two spars lashed together at the top, in contrast to the more common tripod masts used in other maritime Southeast Asian native ships. They were rigged with tanja sails. Their bases can partially revolve, which allowed them to be raised or lowered as needed. They are frequently used as ladders for boarding enemy vessels or for disembarking the crew on shores.

A triangular banner with the standard of the panglima was flown from the stern. Like in karakoa, lanong had decks above the rowers and on both sides of the outriggers for accommodating warriors and for fighting. These platforms were defended by rows of fixed shields. Rowers (who were all galley slaves) were all housed inside the main hull, with none stationed on the outriggers. The oars were arranged into one to three banks on each side, one on top of the other.

Like the garay and penjajap, lanong usually served as motherships to smaller salisipan war-canoes.

== History ==
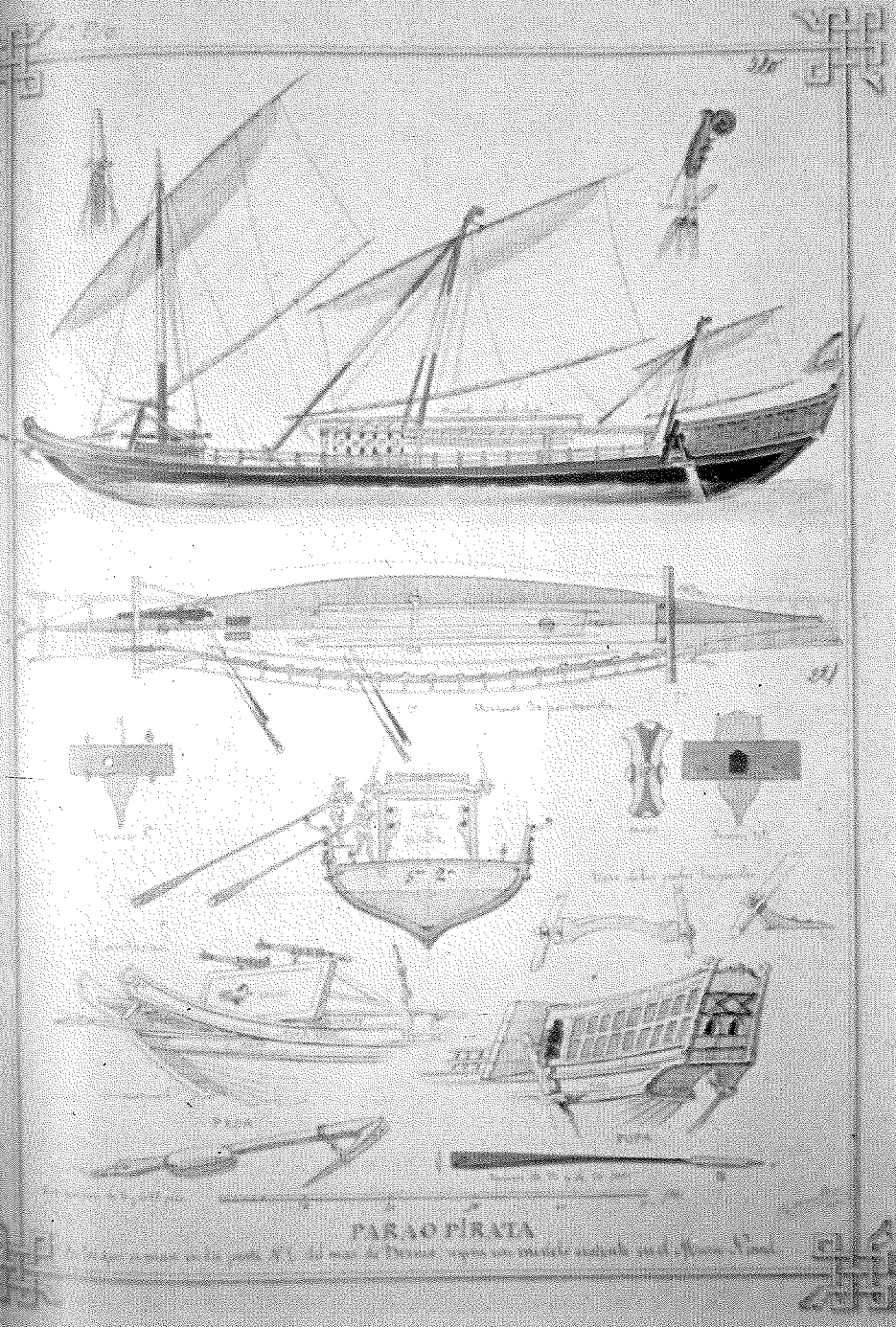
1890 illustrations by Rafael Monleón of a late 19th-century Iranun lanong warship, with detail on weaponry and defenses

Lanong could sail long distances and attacked ships as far as the Straits of Malacca and Java. They became notorious from the mid-18th century to the early 19th century for the raids and piracy (magooray) in most of Southeast Asia. This was spurred by the rising demand for slave labor in the Dutch East Indies as well as growing enmity between the Moro Sultanates and the European colonial powers. Each year, Dutch, Spanish, and English colonies in the region were warned of the "pirate wind", from August to September, when the Iranun and Banguingui ships would traditionally start raiding. From 1774 to 1794, it is estimated that around 100 to 200 ships were launched annually from the Sulu Sea to raid the surrounding areas. The raids were either mounted independently or under the orders of the Sultanate of Sulu and the Sultanate of Maguindanao, whom the Iranun and Banguingui were subjects of.

Unlike the captives of traditional raiders in the rest of the Philippines (who were treated as bondsmen, rather than true slaves), male captives of the Iranun and the Banguingui were treated brutally, even fellow Muslim captives were not spared. Female captives, however, were usually treated better. There were no recorded accounts of rapes, though some were starved for discipline. Rowers in lanong were composed entirely of previously captured male slaves, and it was not uncommon for rowers to die during long cruises due to exhaustion. Most of the slaves were Tagalogs, Visayans, and "Malays" (including Bugis, Mandarese, Iban, and Makassar). There were also occasional European and Chinese captives who were usually ransomed off through Tausug intermediaries of the Sulu Sultanate. Numerous accounts were recorded during this period from escaped slaves. It is estimated that in between 1770 and 1870, around 200,000 to 300,000 people were enslaved by the raiders. By 1850, as much as 50% of the population of the Sultanates in the Sulu archipelago were slaves. The sheer scale of the raids led to the disruption and cessation of traditional trade routes in the Sulu Sea. Notably, the traditional trade with China and the Sultanates of the Sulu Sea stopped. This contributed to the 19th-century economic decline of the Sultanates of Brunei, Sulu, and Maguindanao, eventually leading to the collapse of the latter two states.

Spanish authorities and native Christian Filipinos responded to the Moro slave raids by building watchtowers and forts across the Philippine archipelago. Many of which are still standing today. Some provincial capitals were also moved further inland. Major command posts were built in Manila, Cavite, Cebu, Iloilo, Zamboanga, and Iligan. Defending ships were also built by local communities, especially in the Visayas Islands, including the construction of war "barangayanes" (balangay) that were faster than the Moro raiders and could give chase. As resistance against raiders increased, lanong were eventually replaced by the smaller and faster garay (which did not have outriggers) in the early 19th century. The Moro raids were eventually subdued by several major naval expeditions by the Spanish and local forces from 1848 to 1891, including retaliatory bombardment and capture of Moro settlements. By this time, the Spanish had also acquired steam gunboats (vapor), (Note: Notably the Magellanes, the Elcano, and the Reina de Castilla used by Governor-General Narciso Clavería y Zaldúa in the 1848 Spanish expedition to Balanguingui. The Spanish fleet in the Philippines eventually operated a total of eighteen steam gunships.) which could easily overtake and destroy the native Moro warships.

== See also ==
- Garay (ship), Banguingui warship
- Karakoa, outrigger Filipino warship
- Lancaran (ship), Malay-Indonesian ship
- Jong, Javanese merchant and warship
- Spanish expedition to Balanguingui
- Slavery in Sultanates of Southeast Asia
