= Alipin =

Lowest social class in the precolonial cultures in the Philippines

The alipin refers to the lowest social class among the various cultures of the Philippines before the arrival of the Spanish in the 16th and 17th centuries. The term alipin is used in the Tagalog language. In the Visayan languages, the equivalent social classes were known as the ulipon (Cebuano and Hiligaynon), and uripon (Waray and Bikol), among other terms.

== Overview ==
The most common translation of the word is "servant" or "slave", as opposed to the higher classes of the timawa/maharlika and the tumao/maginoo. This translation, however, is inaccurate. The concept of the alipin relied on a complex system of obligation and repayment through labor in ancient Philippine society, rather than on the actual purchase of a person as in Western and Islamic slavery. Indeed, members of the alipin class who owned their own houses were more accurately equivalent to medieval European serfs and commoners.

== Etymology ==
Tagalog alipin, Visayan and Bikol ulipon and uripon, and Tausug ipun, among other cognates, are all derived from Proto-Philippine *qudipən ("slave" or "servant"), which in turn is from Proto-Malayo-Polynesian *qudip-ən ("allowed to live"). It is an affixed form of Proto-Malayo-Polynesian *qudip (from Proto-Austronesian *qudip, "life" or "to live"), in the sense of sparing the life of a war captive or paying or ransoming someone for a debt that exceeds the value of their life.

Alipin were also known as kiapangdilihan in the Sultanate of Sulu (an Islamized Visayan polity). They were distinguished from the Arab and European-inspired chattel slaves, known as banyaga ("foreigner"), bisaya ("Visayan", who were the most common victims of Moro slave raids during the Spanish colonial period), ipun (a cognate of alipin), or ammas. The kiapangdilihan were commoners who were temporarily enslaved to pay off debt or as punishment for a crime. Like the alipin in other groups, they were slaves only in terms of their temporary service requirement to their master, but retained most of the rights of the freemen, including protection from physical harm and the fact that they could not be sold.

The banyaga, on the other hand, were outsiders captured from slave raids (mostly from Spanish-controlled Philippine territories, as well as neighboring settlements in Malaysia, Indonesia and Brunei). The statuses of the banyaga were permanent. They were treated as possessions with no legal rights, and could be sold or killed at will.

== Subclasses ==
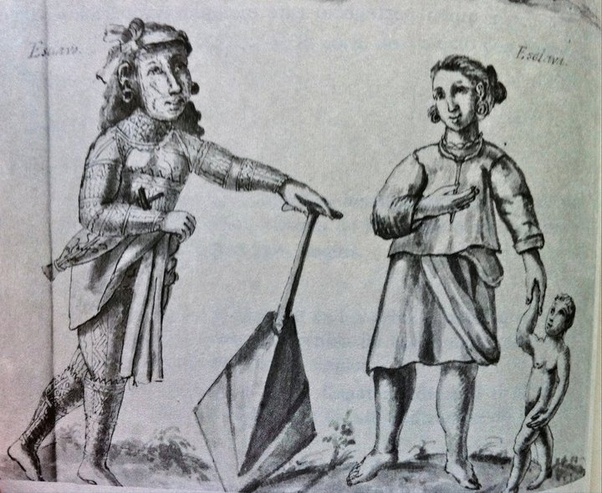
An illustration from Historia de las Islas e Indios de Bisayas (1668) by Francisco Ignacio Alcina depicting a tattooed uluhan with a paddle, labeled "esclavo" ("slave")

As a social class, alipin had several subclasses based on the nature of their obligations and their dependence on their masters:

- Uluhan (literally "at the head"), a hereditary class of ulipon unique to the Visayans and first mentioned in the Boxer Codex (as "horo-han"). Instead of serving obligations through labor, the uluhan instead served their masters as warriors (usually as paddlers for warships). Unlike the timawa warrior class, they were not considered nobility, though higher-status uluhan were virtually indistinguishable from lower-class timawa. Like the timawa, they may also sometimes be obligated to do communal work and paid a vassalage fee known as dagupan.
- Aliping namamahay (literally "servant who is housed") refers to alipin that had their own houses, which was usually built on the property of their masters. They were also known as tuhay, mamahay, or tumaranpoc (Spanish spelling: tumaranpoque) in Visayan, literally means "house dweller" or "villager." They were not at all slaves, as they were often only obligated to pay a percentage of their earnings or harvests (known as handog in Tagalog and buhis in Visayan, 'tribute' and 'tax' respectively) to their masters and no more, thus making them more similar to the medieval European serfs and commoners. They may sometimes be called upon by their masters for harvesting, sowing fields, building new structures, or for aid in emergencies, though these were usually not part of their obligations. They could also freely buy their way out of debt and could marry without the consent of their masters. In the Visayas, some tuhay might also serve their masters in war, like the uluhan.
- Alipin sa gigilid (literally "servant in the corners [of the master's house]") refers to unmarried alipin without a house and whose existence was completely dependent on the graces of their masters. They were also known as tomataban, alalay, hayohay, or ayuey in Visayan (meaning "servant", "assistant", or "follower"). They could only marry with the consent of their master (rarely given for female alipin sa gigilid). Once married, an alipin sa gigilid became an aliping namamahay, as the master was not obligated to feed and house the family of the latter. Their obligations (i.e. services) could also be transferred or sold to another master. Most of the people belonging to this class were the unmarried children of aliping namamahay, or were unransomed captives taken from wars or raids (bihag).

At lower ranks than the above were the alipin of alipin. The alipin sa gigilid of an aliping namamahay was called bulisik ("vile"), while an alipin sa gigilid of an alipin sa gigilid was known by the even more derogatory bulislis (literally meaning "lifted skirt", a term implying that these persons were so vulnerable that it seems like their genitals are exposed). At an even more lower social rank than the latter two were alipin who were acquired through war or who came from other communities. They were often treated as non-persons until they became fully integrated into the local culture.

== Differences from the western concept of slavery ==
While the alipin does, indeed, serve another person, historians note that translating the term as "slave" in the western sense of the word may not be fully justifiable. Documented observations from the 17th century indicate that there may be significant differences between the Western concept of "slave" and the Pre-Hispanic Filipino concept of "alipin". Some academics prefer to use the more accurate terms "debtors", "serfs", "bondsmen", or "dependents" instead.

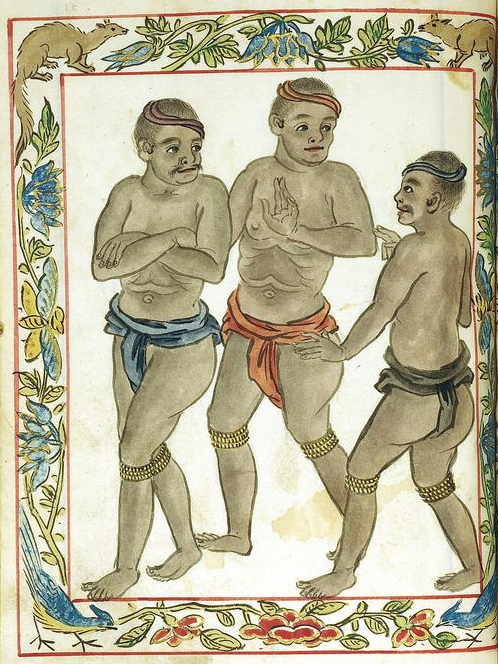
A plate in the Boxer Codex possibly depicting alipin in the Prehispanic Philippines

The lowest class of alipin originating from prisoners-of-war were traded like market goods initially. But unlike Western slaves, subsequent transfer of the alipin to a new master was priced at the value of the [remaining] bond. It was the labor obligation of the alipin being sold, not the person. Most alipin usually acquired their status either voluntarily (usually because of material or honor debt, or as a form of assistance to impoverished relatives), by inheriting the status of their parents, as a form of legal punishment for crime, or by being spared from execution after being captured in wars or raids. Alipin who acquired their status by debt were known as tinubos (literally "redeemed" or "ransomed"), and their creditors might sell their services for profit at the price of the debt incurred.

The actual degree of obligations of the alipin could vary considerably. It was dependent on the monetary equivalent of the obligation owed and was usually limited in duration. An alipin could earn their freedom or gain higher status by marriage, being set free by their masters (known as matitimawa or tinimawa among Visayans), buying it with their earnings, fulfillment of the obligations, or by extraordinary accomplishments and bravery in battle.

The inheritance of the alipin status was subject to a complex system of rules dependent on the offspring's condition known as the saya. For example, the first child of a male freeman and a female alipin would be free, but their second child would be an alipin like the mother; and so on with the rest of the children. If the number of children was not even, the last child would be a partial alipin. The master of an aliping namamahay might also sometimes take one child of the latter as an alipin sa gigilid in the case of the latter's death. They might become sibin or ginogatan ("favorites") of their masters and be set free upon the master's death.

An alipin who inherits the debts of their parents was known as a gintubo (literally "grown up with"). Children of parents who are both alipin were known as ginlubos, while the children of ginlubos were known as lubos nga ulipon.

Partial alipin retain their alipin ancestors' obligations according to their degree of relation. The partial alipin child of a timawa and an alipin, for example, will inherit half of their alipin parent's obligations, while the grandchild of an alipin will only owe a quarter. Half alipin whose services were scheduled alternately by months are referred to as bulan ("moon" or "month") or pikas ("half"). Quarter alipin were referred to as tilor or sagipat ("quarter"). They could also freely buy their way out of service if they can afford it. Part or all of the alipin duties of the parents are often taken over by their children.

== See also ==
- Slavery in the Sultanate of Sulu
- Piracy in the Sulu Sea
- Spanish expedition to Balanguingui

== Sources ==
- Ibn Hishām, Abu Muhammad ‘Abd al-Malik (2001). Sabīl al-Hudā 'alā Sharh Qaţr al-Nadā wa-Ball a;-Ṣadā. Damascus: Maktab Dār al-Fajr.
