= Francisco Ignacio Alcina =

Spanish Jesuit historian (born 1610)

- Born: 2 February 1610; Gandía, Spain
- Died: 30 July 1674 (aged 64); Manila, Captaincy General of the Philippines
- Occupations: Theologian, Historian
- Notable work: Historia de las islas e indios de Bisayas (1668)

Francisco Ignacio (de) Alcina SJ (also Alzina, Alçina) (February 2, 1610 – July 30, 1674) was a Spanish historian and a Jesuit missionary in the Philippines. He served as parish priest in the Visayan islands for 37 years. Most of those years were spent among the natives whom he used to call "my beloved Bisayans."

== Early life ==
=== Birth and education ===
Francisco Ignacio Alzina was born on February 2, 1610, in Gandía, Valencia, Spain. He was one of the eight boys; six of his brothers died at an early age. At the age of 14, Alzina entered the Jesuit Province of Aragon and he was only 22 years old, a cleric in theological studies, when he was chosen for Philippine Missions.

== Missionary life ==
=== Arrival in the Philippines ===
In 1631, together with other Jesuit missionaries, he left Zaragoza and travelled to Mexico. Later that same year he left Acapulco and had first sight of the Philippine islands on May 15, 1632. Alcina arrived in Manila on May 26 and stayed two and a half years where he completed his studies and until his ordination. Alcina was ordained by Augustinian Bishop D. Fe. Pedro de Arce, who had been a catechist and pastor in the Bisayan Islands for a long time.

=== Bisayan missions ===
After his ordination, he was first assigned in Borongan, Samar or Ibabao (Ybabao), as that eastern coast was called in olden times.

Alcina's assignments 1637 – 1668

Year	Location
1637	Paranas, Samar
1645–1648	Rector of Carigara, Residence of Leyte
1649	Cebu
1653–1656	Catbalogan, Samar
1657–1666	Rector of Palapag, Samar
1667–1668	Catbalogan, Samar

== Notable work ==
Alcina spent most of his time documenting the general information of the Visayas and its people, including language, arts, science and their ancient traditions.

Alcina documented East Visayan literature including the poetic forms such as the candu, haya, ambahan, canogon, bical, balac, siday and awit. He also described the susumaton and posong, early forms of narratives.

- Alcina, Fr Francisco Ignacio (1668). Historia natural del sitio, fertilidad y calidad de las Islas e Indios de Bisayas [Alcina's History of the Bisayan Islands] (in Spanish).

Part I = The location, the fertility and the nature of the Visayas and its inhabitants.
Part II = the Supernatural and ecclesiastical
