= Maharlika =

Feudal warrior class in Tagalog society

The maharlika (Baybayin pre-virama: ᜋᜑᜎᜒᜃ meaning freeman or freedman) were the feudal warrior class in ancient Tagalog society in Luzon, the Philippines. They belonged to the lower nobility class similar to the timawa of the Visayan people. In modern Filipino, however, the word has come to refer to aristocrats or to royal nobility, which was actually restricted to the hereditary maginoo class.

== Overview ==
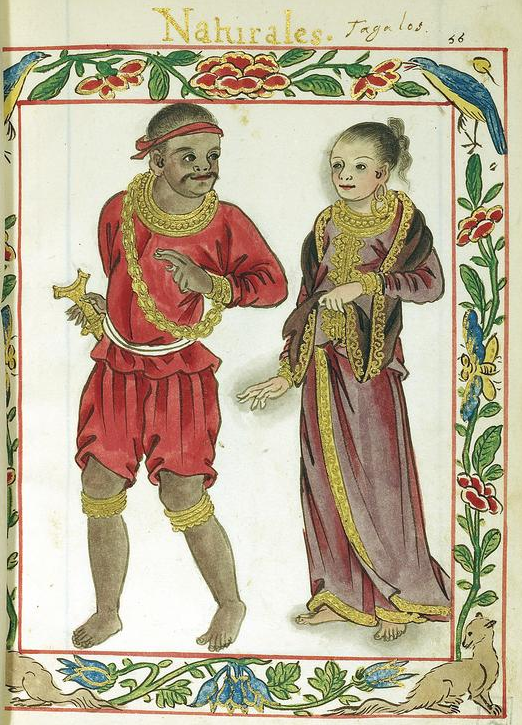
Tagalog people from the Boxer Codex.

The maharlika were a martial class of freemen. Like the timawa, they were free vassals of their datu who were exempt from taxes and tribute but were required to provide military service. In times of war, the maharlika were obligated to provide and prepare weapons at their own expense and answer the summons of the datu, wherever and whenever that might be, in exchange for a share in the war spoils (ganima). They accompanied their ruler in battles as comrades-at-arms and were always given a share. 1/5 of the spoils goes to the Ginoo and the 4/5 will be shared among the Maharlikans who participated, who in turn will subdivide their shares to their own warriors. The maharlika may also occasionally be obligated to work on the lands of the datu and assist in projects and other events in the community.

Unlike the timawa, however, the maharlika were more militarily-oriented than the timawa nobility of the Visayas. While the maharlika could change allegiances by marriage or by emigration like the timawa, they were required to host a feast in honor of their current datu and paid a sum ranging from six to eighteen pieces of gold before they could be freed from their obligations. In contrast, the timawa were free to change allegiances at any time, as exemplified by the action of Rajah Humabon upon the arrival of Ferdinand Magellan.

The earliest appearance of the term is manlica mentioned in the Boxer Codex with the meaning of "freeman". The only other contemporary account of the maharlika class was by the Franciscan friar Juan de Plasencia in the 16th century. He distinguished them from the hereditary nobility class of the Tagalogs (the maginoo class, which included the datu). The historian William Henry Scott believes that the class originated from high-status warriors who married into the maginoo blood or were perhaps remnants of the nobility class of a conquered line. Similar high-status warriors in other Philippine societies like that of the Bagobo, Higaonon Sugbohanon and the Bukidnon did not inherit their positions, but were acquired through martial prowess.

After the Spanish conquest, the Spanish translated the name maharlika as Hidalgos (or libres).

== Etymology ==
The term maharlika is a loanword from Sanskrit maharddhika (महर्द्धिक), a title meaning "man of wealth, knowledge, or ability". Contrary to modern definitions, it did not refer to the ruling class, but rather to a warrior class (which were minor nobility) of the Tagalog people, directly equivalent to Visayan timawa. Like timawa, the term also has connotations of "freeman" or "freed slave" in both Filipino and Malay languages.

In some Indo-Malayan languages, as well as the languages of the Muslim areas of the Philippines, the cognates mardika, merdeka, merdeheka, and maradika mean "freedom" or "freemen" (as opposed to servitude). The Malay term mandulika, also meant "governor".

The Merdicas (also spelled Mardicas or Mardikas), whose name comes from the same etymon, were also the Catholic native inhabitants of the islands of Ambon, Ternate, and Tidore of the Moluccas in modern-day Indonesia, converted during the Portuguese and Spanish occupation of the islands by Jesuit missionaries. Most were enslaved or expelled to Batavia (modern Jakarta) and Java when the Dutch Empire conquered Ambon in 1605. The remaining Catholic natives in Ternate and Tidore were resettled by the Spanish in the communities of Ternate and Tanza, Cavite, Manila in 1663 when the Spanish evacuated the islands under threat of invasion by the Dutch-allied Muslim sultanates.

The name of the Mardijker people of Batavia also comes from the same etymon, and referred to freed slaves and servants under Dutch rule who were composed largely of Portuguese-speaking Catholic Goans, Moluccan Merdicas, and Filipinos (the Papangers) captured by Moro raiders.

== Modern usage ==
=== Usage as propaganda during the Marcos regime ===
During the "New Society Movement" (Kilusang Bagong Lipunan) era in the Philippines, President Ferdinand Marcos used the word maharlika to promote an authoritarian view of Filipino nationalism under martial law, claiming that it referred to the ancient Filipino nobility and included the kings and princes of ancient Philippine society. Marcos was influential in making "maharlika" a trendy name for streets, edifices, banquet halls, villages and cultural organizations. Marcos himself utilized the word to christen a highway, a broadcasting corporation, and the reception area of Malacañang Palace.

Marcos's use of the word started during World War II. Marcos claimed that he had commanded a group of guerrillas known as the Maharlika Unit. Marcos also used Maharlika as his personal nom de guerre, depicting himself as the most bemedalled anti-Japanese Filipino guerrilla soldier during World War II. In the years before the martial law period in the Philippines, Marcos commissioned a film entitled Maharlika to be based on his "war exploits". However, critic Ernie M. Hizon of the Manila Standard noted that the film does not actually depict any of the details from Marcos' alleged exploits during World War II, but is instead a "run-of-the-mill Hollywood war film populated by third-class actors."

A later variant of the hoax linked with Marcos historical distortionism falsely claimed that the whole Philippine archipelago had once been a single "Maharlika Kingdom," and that Marcos' alleged personal wealth came about because the so-called royal family of this kingdom had hired Marcos as their lawyer in the days after World War II, paying him "192 thousand tons of gold" for his legal services.

=== Usage as a new name for the Philippines ===
Senator Eddie Ilarde was the first to propose to rename the Philippines into "Maharlika" in 1978, citing the need to honor the country's ancient heritage before the Spanish and Americans occupied the country. Ferdinand Marcos was in favor of changing the name of the Philippines into "Maharlika", thinking it meant "nobility", as a symbol of nationalism. In 2019, President Rodrigo Duterte reiterated the idea, thinking that it means "more of a concept of serenity and peace".

=== Usage in popular culture ===
The modern use of maharlika persists in original Philippine music (OPM), notably in the lyrics of "Ako ay Pilipino", a song commissioned by Ferdinand Marcos' First Lady, Imelda Marcos.

The word maharlika is used by the semi-professional basketball league Maharlika Pilipinas Basketball League, and the football club Maharlika Manila F.C. of the Philippines Football League.

== See also ==
- Arnis/Eskrima/Kali
  - Eskrima in popular culture
- Bagani
- Bolo knife
- Conspiracy of the Maharlikas
- Filipino martial arts
- Juramentado
- Kinamutay
- Knight
- Kshatriya
- Maradeka
- Merdeka
- Samurai
- Sikaran
- Suntukan
- Timawa
