= Moro War =

Moro War may refer to:

- Moro insurgency in the Philippines (1969–present)
- Moro War for Secession from Philippines (1935–1968)
- Moro–American War (1899–1913)
- Moros during World War II (1941–1945)
- Spanish–Moro conflict (16th century-1904)

== See also ==
- Moro River Campaign (December 1943)
