= Independence Day (Indonesia) =

National holiday in Indonesia, 17 August

Independence Day of Indonesia Hari Kemerdekaan Republik Indonesia "HUT RI"
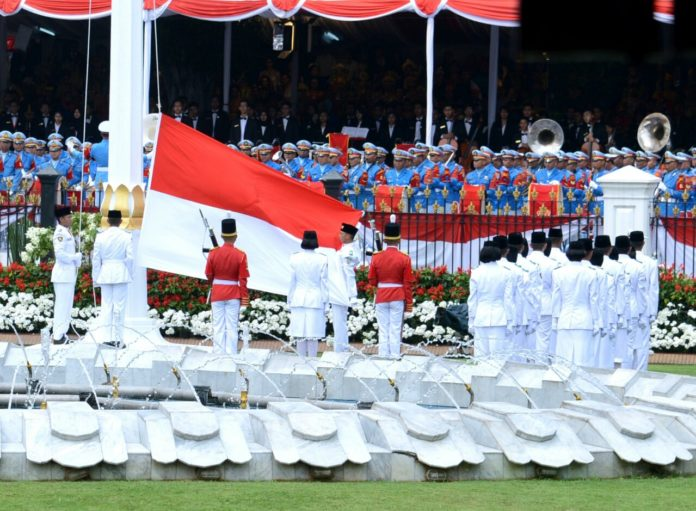
- The annual independence day national flag hoisting ceremony held in Merdeka Palace, Jakarta
- Official name: Hari Ulang Tahun Kemerdekaan Republik Indonesia (shortened HUT RI)
- Also called: HUT RI, Tujuhbelasan
- Observed by: Indonesians
- Type: National
- Significance: Marks the proclamation of independence of Indonesia
- Date: 17 August
- Next time: 17 August 2027
- Frequency: Annual

The Independence Day of Indonesia (in Indonesian formally known as Hari Ulang Tahun Kemerdekaan Republik Indonesia shortened "HUT RI", or simply Hari Kemerdekaan, and colloquially referred by the people as Tujuhbelasan, meaning "the Seventeenth") is a national holiday in Indonesia commemorating the anniversary of Indonesia's proclamation of independence from the Netherlands on 17 August 1945. It was made a national holiday by government decree in 1946.

Ceremonies and festivities are held throughout the country to celebrate this national day, including the flag hoisting ceremony conducted nation-wide and at Indonesian diplomatic installations abroad, local community competitions, with patriotic and cultural parades. Discounts are offered by participating shopping centres or businesses. On 16 August or the last Friday prior to 17 August, the president of Indonesia addresses the nation at the People's Consultative Assembly.

On August 17, at 10:00 Western Indonesian Time all the Indonesian national television networks traditionally broadcast the National Independence Day Ceremony live from the Merdeka Palace in Jakarta. Earlier that day, cities and regencies throughout Indonesia conduct the flag hoisting ceremony at their respective city halls. Streets, public places and public transportation are filled with nationalistic and patriotic decorations and art dominating with the red and white colors symbolizing the national flag of Indonesia throughout the month of August.

== The obligation to hoist the national flag ==
According to the Constitution of Indonesia Act Number 24 Year 2009 concerning the National Flag, National Language, State Symbols, and the National Anthem Article 7 paragraph 3, it obliges every citizen of Indonesia to fly the national flag in front of their houses as well as on public institutions, office buildings, educational institutions, and on private and public transportation facilities throughout the country, as well as on Indonesian diplomatic offices abroad, on the 17 August. Nowadays, the government requests the public to fly the national flag for a whole month in August (starting from the 1st till the 31st) to commemorate the Proclamation of Indonesia's Independence. In 2018, it was reported that some Indonesians did not know the obligation to raise the national flag, prompting some local authorities to provide flags for residents and businesses not displaying them.

Independence day pennant flags known locally as umbul-umbul. These are the modern type of umbul-umbul using digital printing,

In August, community members also raise red and white pennant flags (umbul-umbul) and banners along streets and alleys and also decorate the community with shades of red and white as a representation of the colors of the national flag to celebrate and welcome the independence day, a custom which has been in practice for many years.

== National-level observances ==
=== Mass communal prayer ===
An annual mass communal prayer titled Zikir dan Doa Kebangsaan ('Remembrance of the God and Prayer for the Nation') is held annually every 1 August, as the first agenda of the annual Independence Day observance. It is co-hosted by the Ministry of State Secretariat and the Ministry of Religious Affairs. The event is filled by communal Islamic prayers, salawat, recital of the Quran and religious lectures. Although it adheres to the Islamic practice, the event has featured representations of five other religions in Indonesia (namely Protestantism, Catholicism, Hinduism, Buddhism, and Confucianism), where they perform the interfaith prayer for the nation as the conclusion of the event. Zikir dan Doa Kebangsaan has been held in several locations in Jakarta: the Merdeka Palace forecourt (until 2024), Proclamation Monument (2025), and the National Monument (2026).

=== Presidential address ===
The President of Indonesia addresses the nation every 16 August or the last Friday prior to 17 August at the Seat of the People's Consultative Assembly (MPR) in Jakarta. The annual morning presidential address is held as part of the MPR joint plenary session with the deputies of the House of Representatives (DPR) and the Senate (DPD) together, and was coined by the first President, Sukarno. During the New Order era under President Suharto, the address sought the President's accountability to the MPR as the supreme state organ of power. Since the reformation era, specifically since the tenure of Joko Widodo, the address serves as a medium for the executive branch of the government to address its accountability to the people.

The address is split into two parts: the annual presidential address to the MPR in the morning, and the address to the House of Representatives regarding the national budget in the afternoon, as the budget is presented to the House to begin the process of drafting legislation as provided by law. The presidential addresses, therefore, officially mark the beginning of the Indonesian legislative year, as following the Independence Day is the official anniversaries of the 1945 Constitution and of the People's Consultative Assembly (18 August) and the House of Representatives (29 August).

=== Malam Renungan Suci ===
Malam Renungan Suci ('Night of the Sacred Reflection') is held every midnight of 17 August at 12:00am at the Kalibata Heroes' Cemetery. It is a performance to reflect the struggle of those who fought for Independence in a solemn atmosphere.

== Flag hoisting ceremony ==
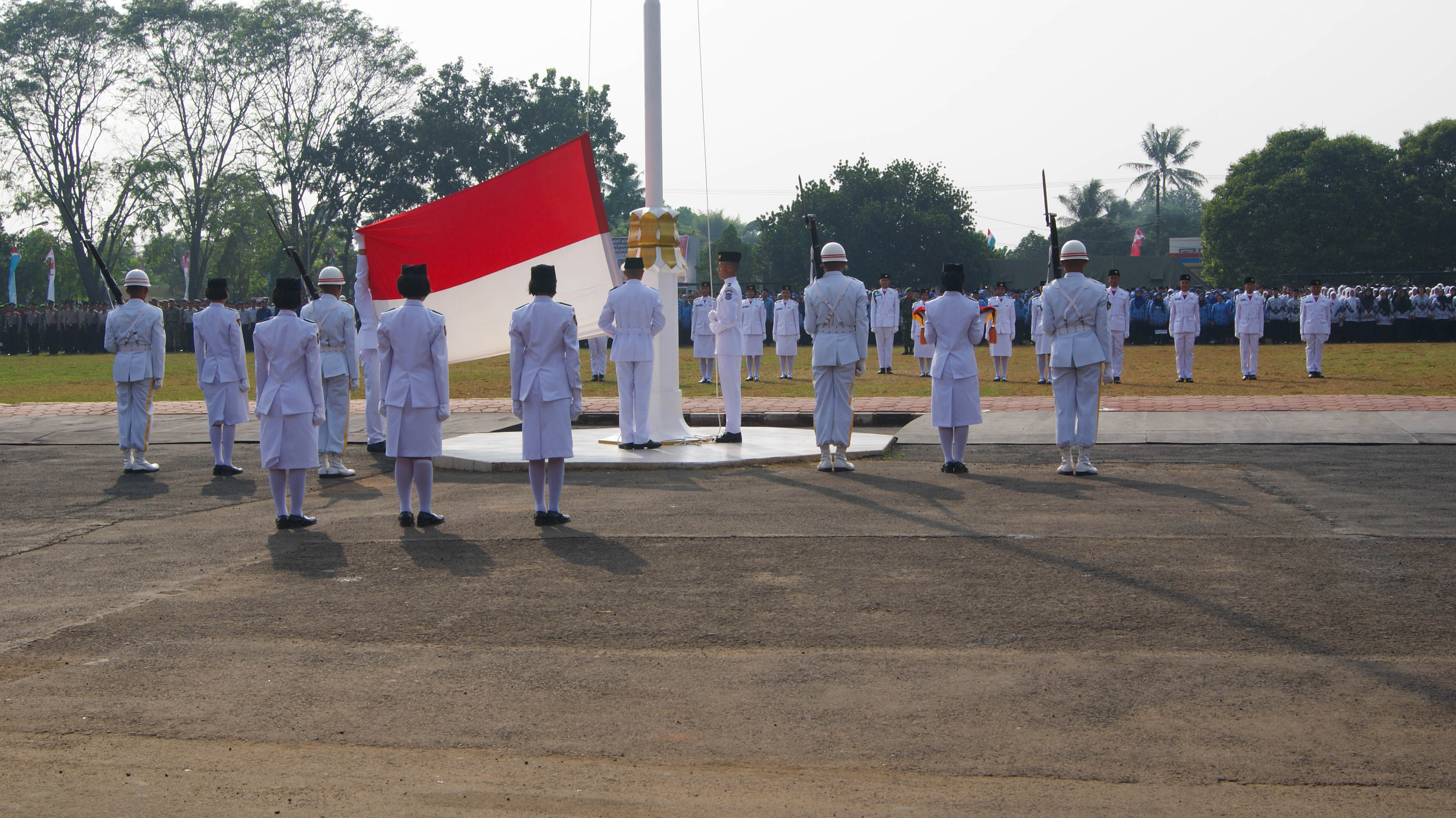
A flag hoisting ceremony held in the South Tangerang City Hall on the 17th of August to commemorate independence day

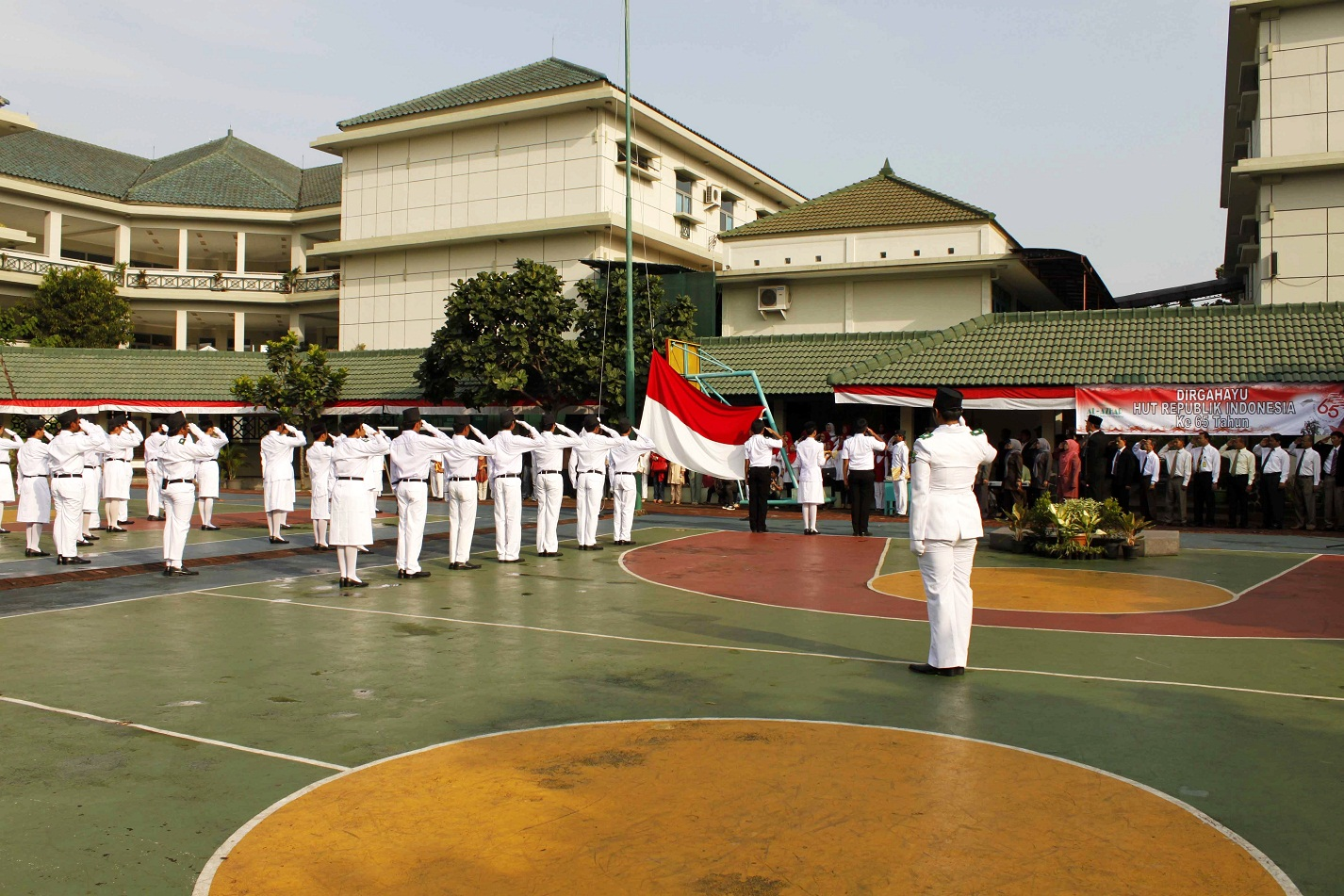
A flag hoisting ceremony held in a school in Indonesia commemorating the Independence Day

Flag hoisting ceremony on the morning of 17 August is the core observance of the Independence Day. The national Flag Hoisting Ceremony takes place at the Merdeka Palace in Jakarta hosted by the president of Indonesia accompanied by the vice-president to reenact the declaration of independence proclaimed by President Sukarno in 1945, held at 10.00 AM. It is broadcast nationwide by state and private television and radio stations, and is broadcast live on YouTube by the State Secretariat and a number of Indonesian television networks.

=== National level ===
The national Independence Day ceremony at the Merdeka Palace is broadcast live nationally starting at 09.00 AM Western Indonesian Time, 17 August. The ceremony is attended by distinguished guests from ambassadors and foreign defense attaches, former Indonesian presidents and vice-presidents, ministers and other government officials, prominent state figures, cultural figures including artists and celebrities, veterans, and other selected invitees from the general public. Since 2017, all official attendees, including the President and Vice President are always dressed in various traditional clothing that is changed every year, with the best clothed audience members given prizes by the organizers.

The ceremony starts as the tri-services and police guard of honour enters the palace forecourt at about 9.30 AM to the tune of marching music from the combined military band. The guard of honour is provided by headquarters battalion of the National Armed Forces, all composed of military policemen and women, the HQ Detachment of the National Police, the military academies, the National Police Academy, and the Presidential Security Force. As the president and vice-president enter the palace, the Ceremony Commander (Komandan Upacara), usually a colonel, leads the parade in the general salute to the president, followed by the remembrance of the proclamation of independence precisely at 10.00 AM accompanied by 17-gun salute fired from the National Monument (Monas) by the Indonesian Army 7th Field Artillery Battalion and an air warning siren sound from inside the National Palace. The ceremony is continued by reading of the proclamation of Independence by the speaker of the House of Representatives, followed by moment of silence known as Mengheningkan Cipta—which is always accompanied with the playing of a hymn originating since at least 1958 composed by Surakarta Sunanate composer Truno Prawit—to remember those who have fallen in duty and national prayer read by the Minister of Religious Affairs.

The core event of the ceremony takes place as the National Flag Hoisting Troop (composed of high school students who pass the selection processes, representing every province) marches into the main palace forecourt to raise the national flag by goose-stepping. As they enter the complex, the national flag is presented to the color company of students and personnel of the Presidential Security Force. Afterwards they march to the flagpole to raise the national flag accompanied by the playing of the national anthem Indonesia Raya. After the flag is raised, a fly-past is conducted by the Indonesian Air Force fighter aircraft right above the Merdeka Palace followed by joint services national flag flypast with helicopters of the Armed Forces and Police (introduced in the 2021 parade inspired by the Singapore National Day Parade), continued with orchestral and musical performance by Indonesian national orchestra the Gita Bahana Nusantara (under direction of Directorate of Films, Music, and Media Affairs) presenting Indonesian patriotic and traditional songs. The ceremony is concluded by a final general salute to the president and the honour guards exit the palace forecourt at noon. For much of the 2000s that format was observed until the 2022 ceremony, wherein the ceremony format was reformatted in 2023 with the ceremonial segment ending just early in order that the Gita Bahana Nusantara concert, one of the most awaited parts of the morning, would immediately follow.

At 5 PM Western Indonesian Time, the National Flag Lowering Ceremony takes place at Merdeka Palace hosted by the president and vice-president of Indonesia. The ceremony is usually preceded by marching band, musical and traditional dance performances usually broadcast live since 4 PM. The lowering of the flag is conducted by the second group of the National Flag Hoisting Troop and the national flag is given back to the president by the flag carrier.

=== Regional level ===
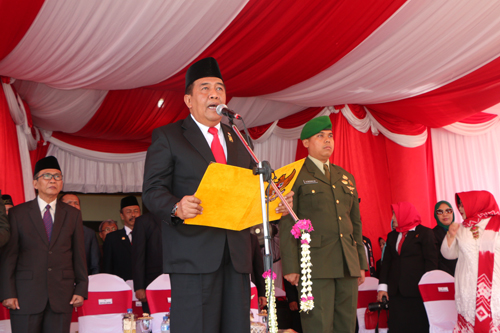
The independence day commemoration ceremony taking place at Banjarbaru City, South Kalimantan

On 17 August, the national flag hoisting and lowering ceremonies are also conducted in every city and regency throughout the country with the local Mayor or Regent as the guest of honor (for the ceremony conducted at the city or regency level), and the provincial governor as the guest of honor (for the ceremony conducted at the provincial capital city level). The flag hoisting ceremony takes place earlier in the morning, which is at 7 AM local time for the regional level before the national level at Merdeka Palace in Jakarta commences. The flag-lowering ceremony is conducted at about 5 PM local time. Many of these regional ceremonies are also live streamed.

=== International level ===
On 17 August, Indonesian embassies and diplomatic offices around the world conduct the Flag Hoisting (in the morning) and the Flag Lowering Ceremony (at the afternoon) local time. After the flag hoisting ceremony, Indonesian embassies abroad usually also held some festivities, including cultural performances, music show, singing contests, competitions, and organising tent bazaar; selling Indonesian foods, handycrafts, souvenirs and various products. During this event, bazaar and festivities usually invites Indonesian expatriates and also foreign Indonesian culture enthusiasts.

=== Other independence day ceremonies ===
Other than the national and regional flag hoisting ceremonies conducted by the government, schools, private sectors, offices, corporations, and other organizations throughout the country also conducts the flag hoisting ceremony to commemorate the proclamation of Indonesian Independence. It is usually done a couple of days after 17 August while some organizations or institutions conduct it on 17 August.

== Independence day festivities ==
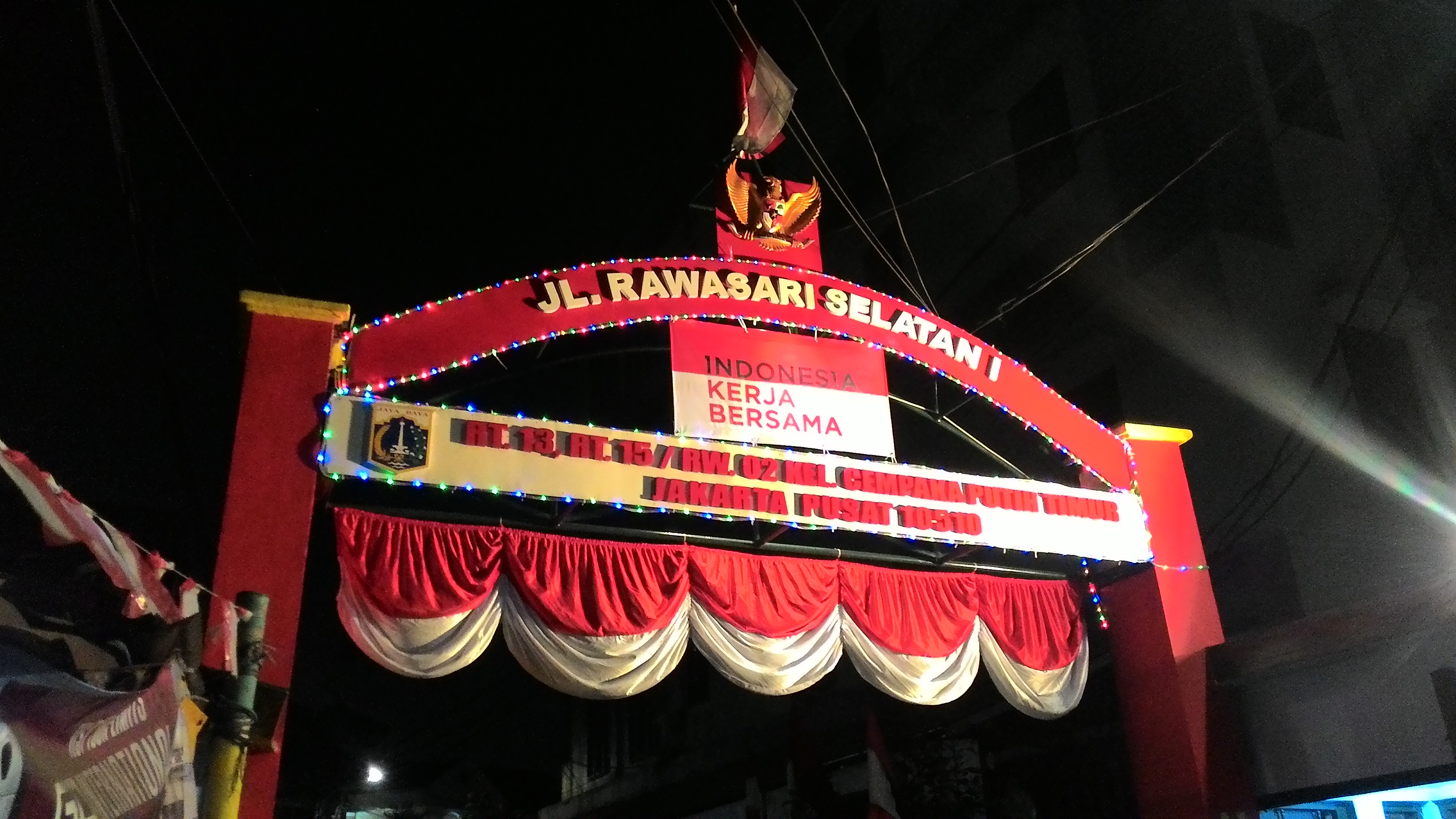
The Gapura is an archway of an entrance to a residential area in Indonesia. Members of the community usually decorate it to welcome and celebrate the proclamation of Indonesian Independence

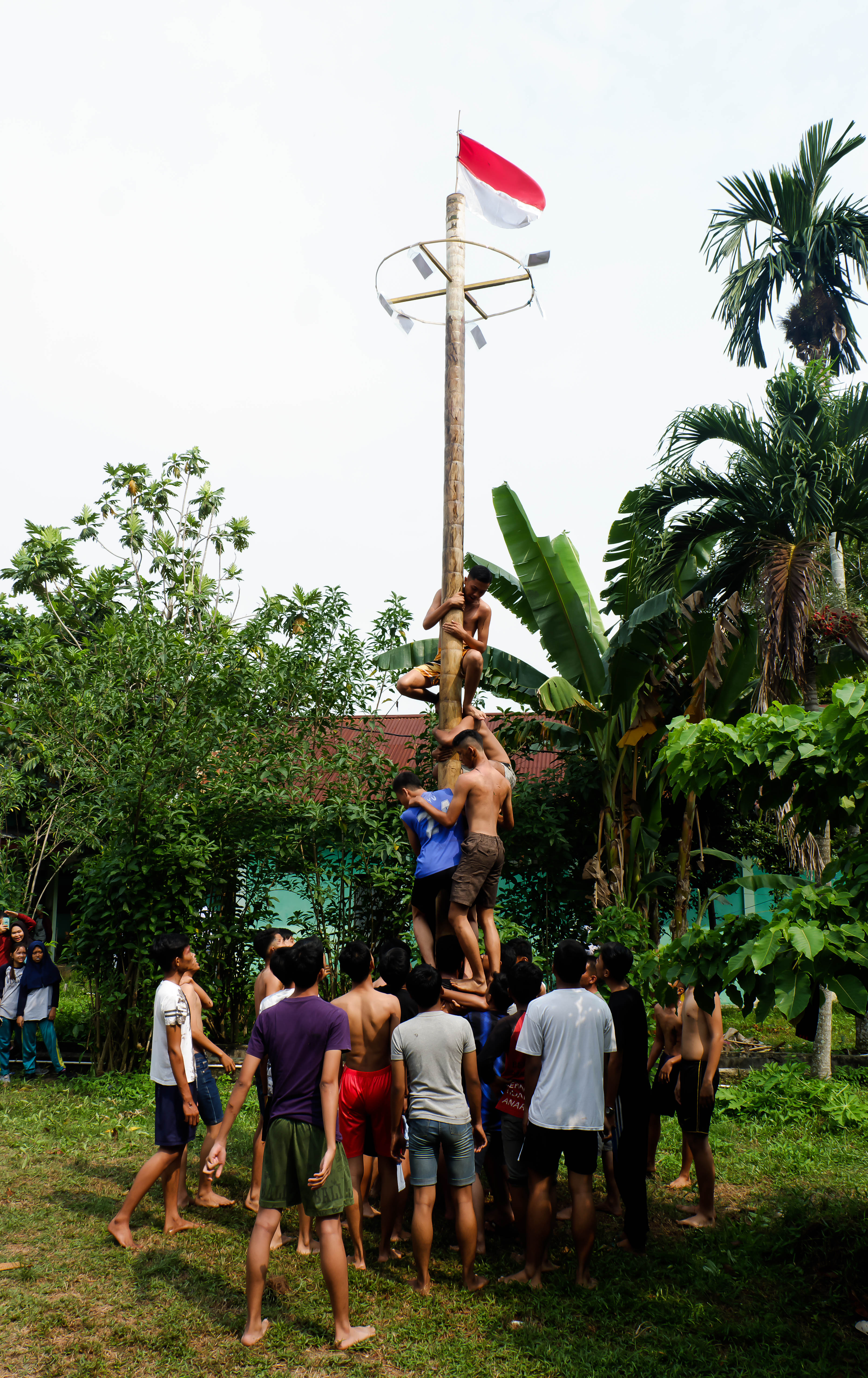
Panjat Pinang, a popular independence day game in Indonesia

Independence Day is regarded as an important public holiday in Indonesia, and to celebrate the proclamation of Indonesian Independence, it is filled with joyful community competitions organized by localities throughout the country (locally known as lomba tujuhbelasan meaning "independence day competitions"). After witnessing the National Flag Hoisting ceremony in the morning, in the afternoon people usually participate in such activities. Some areas organize these competitions a couple of days or weeks after 17 August, usually organizing it on a weekend.

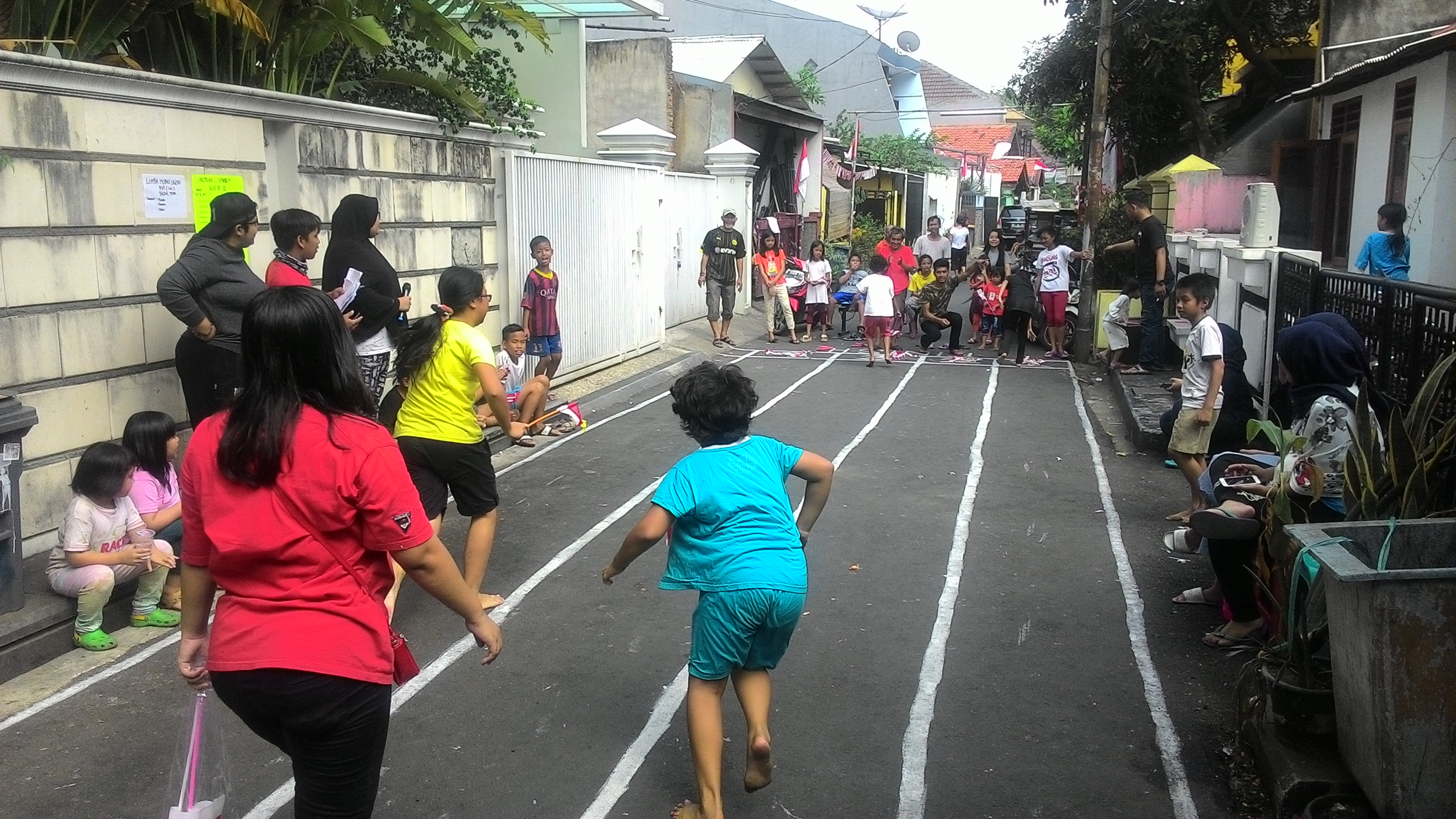
Other community competitions are also organized such as this flag race for children

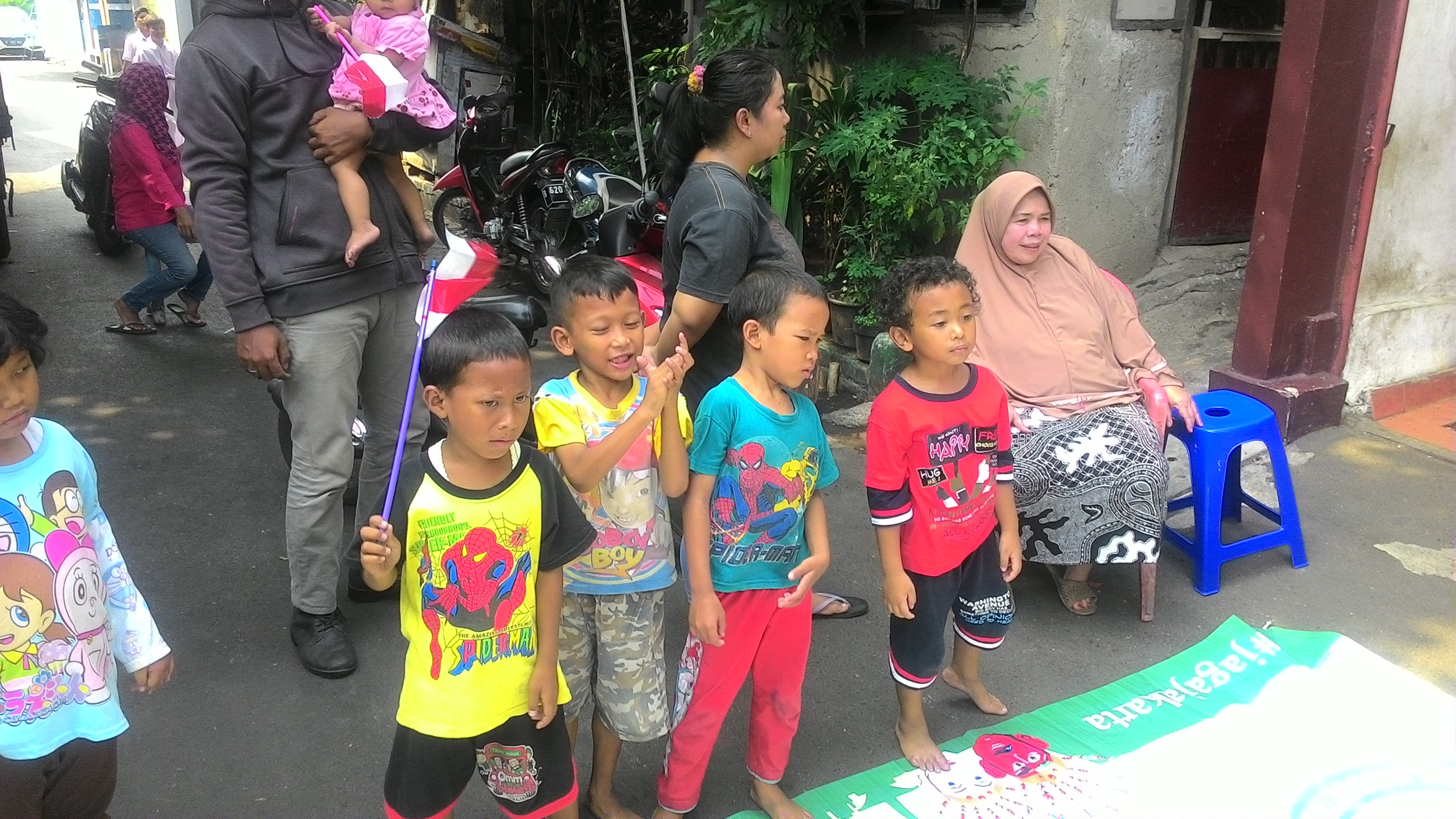
Children participating in a competition

Traditional games and competitions usually held to commemorate independence day are:

- Krupuk-eating race, krupuks are hanged on a thread and competitors must race to eat them with their hands behind their backs.
- Panjat pinang, it is a famous independence day game usually conducted at villages or communities throughout the country. The game is done by using a greased pole and putting precious prizes on top, and participants must climb the pole to get the prizes.
- Community Marching, known locally as Gerak Jalan is done where participants wear unique uniforms and march in a synchronized manner. This is done to compete between members of a neighborhood and is usually participated by adults.
- Bicycling carnival, known locally as Sepeda hias is participated by children riding their bicycles decorated in the Independence Day theme with red and white and the winner would be announced for the best decorated bicycle.
- Marble in spoon race, usually for children. A marble is placed in a spoon that is held in the competitor's mouth. Competitors must balance the marble while walking along the line and race towards the finish line.
- Sack race
- Bottle fishing, a nail is tied with a thread that's tied on the waist and hanged from the competitor's behind. Competitors must place the nail bait into the bottle and try to pull or "fish" the bottle.
- Wooden clog race
- Musical chairs
- Tug of war
- Coin biting
- Pillow fight
- Hitting the kendi terracotta jar blindfolded, similar to a piñata
- Balloon bursting
- Balloon dance
- Orange dance
- Searching for coins in flour
- Inserting thread into needle race
- Colouring competition
- Flag race, usually for children. Several small flags are placed in a container in one side and an empty container is placed on the other side. Each child must race to place these flags into the empty container one by one.
- Catching the eel race
- Sarong football or daster football, a football competition among men, made more difficult by wearing a sarong or daster (a form of women's casual home dress, usually worn by mothers).

Various sports competitions are also held such as soccer, badminton, volleyball, table tennis, etc.

== Independence day carnivals ==
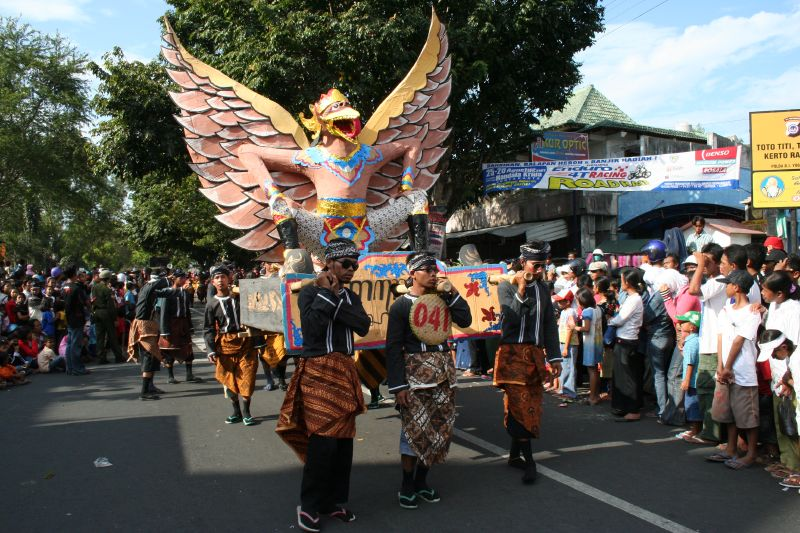
Independence parade carnival in Bantul, Special Region of Yogyakarta

On Independence Day, parades or carnivals take place on streets in cities and villages across the nation. They might take the form of a modest carnival, organized by local people, where children and sometimes adults wear patriotic clothes, or traditional ethnic costumes. Some larger parades might be held and organized by provincial, regency, or municipal governments, staged in main thoroughfares of cities.

Some places may hold independence day carnivals not precisely on 17 August, but usually on a Saturday or Sunday following that date. The parade and carnival usually feature marching bands, decorative floats, patriotic parades by civilian organizations and cultural carnivals featuring traditional costumes of the various ethnic groups of Indonesia.

In Jakarta the national parade usually starts in Merdeka Square by the National Monument, parading through the capital's main avenues; Thamrin and Sudirman avenues, passing Selamat Datang Monument and the Semanggi Interchange. The national parade, in the past, added a military and police element, but was revived in 2025.

The main national carnival is not just staged in the national capital, but in provinces with regional cities taking turns hosting this national event. In 2017, for example, the national independence carnival was staged in Bandung, West Java.

Year	Date	Location	Theme	References
1965	17 August (20th Independence Day)	Jakarta		
2015	22 August	Pontianak	Hutan (Forest)	
2016	21 August	Danau Toba	Air (Water)	
2017	26 August	Bandung	Pegunungan dan Kota (Mountain and City)	
2018	not held			
2019	18 August	Jakarta	—	
2020–2024	not held			
2025	17 August	Jakarta	—	
2026	17 August	Jakarta	—	

== Gallery ==
Festivities and activities celebrating the Independence Day of Indonesia:

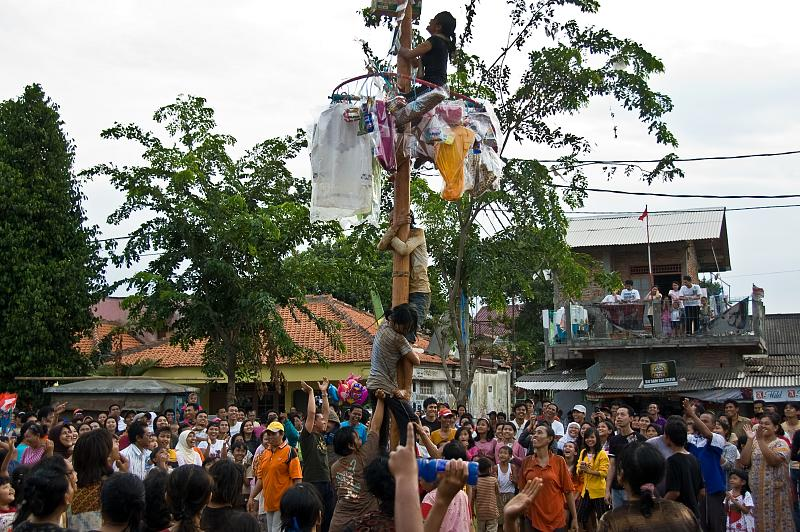
A Panjat Pinang game taking place at a neighborhood on independence day

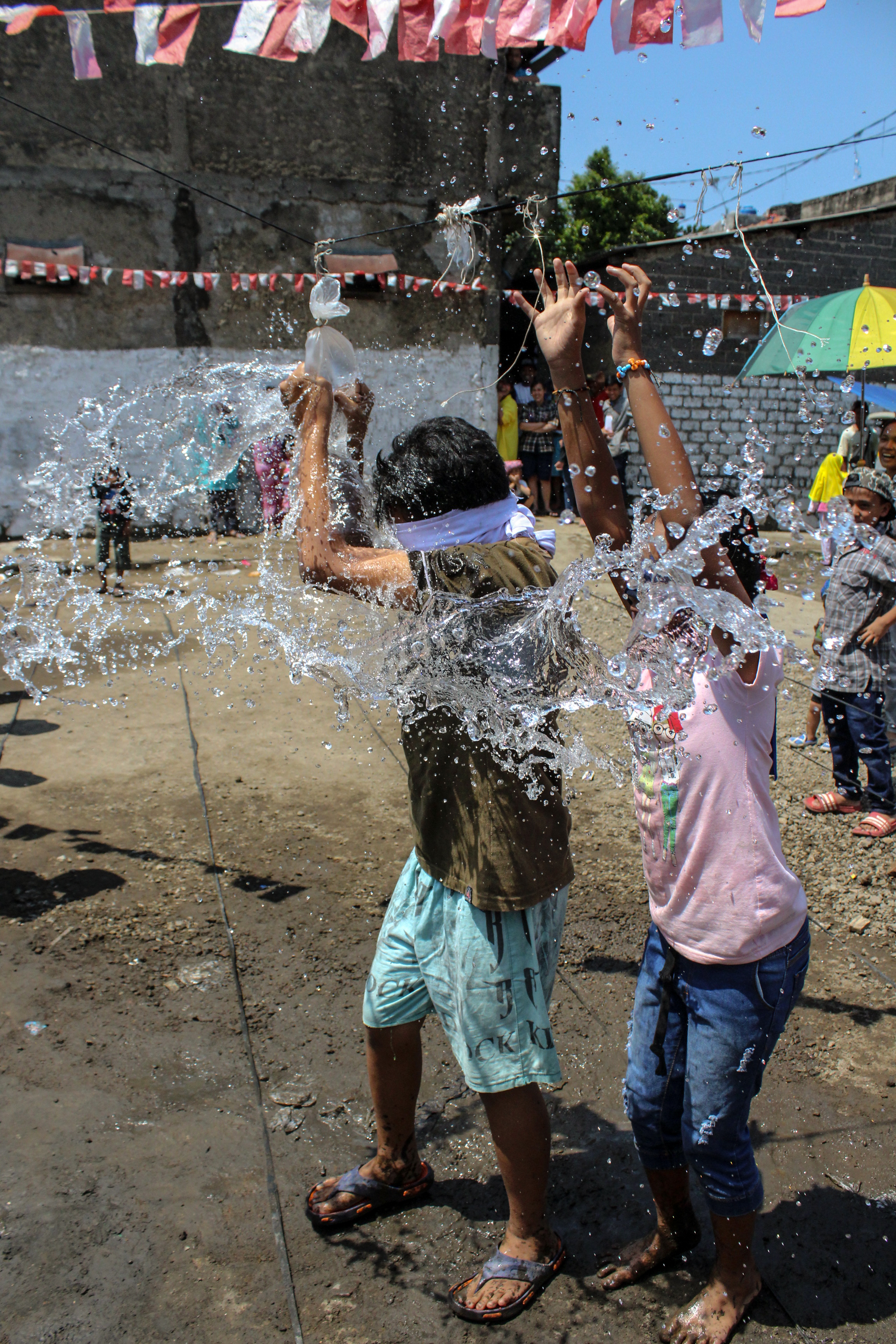
A children's game commemorating independence day

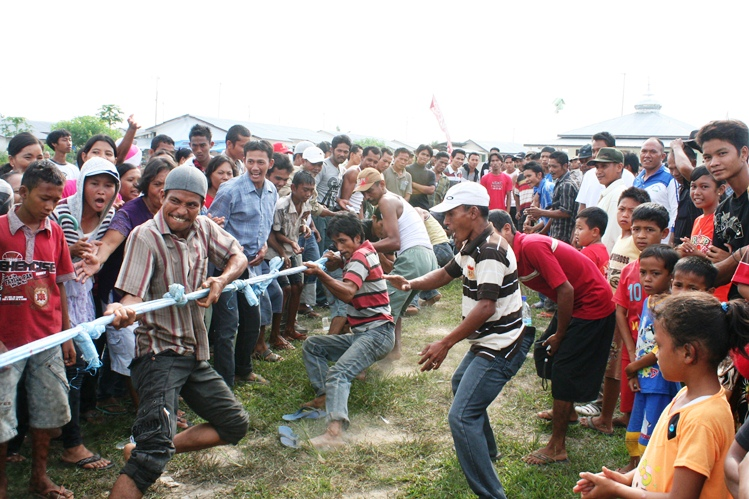
A tug of war by men commemorating independence day

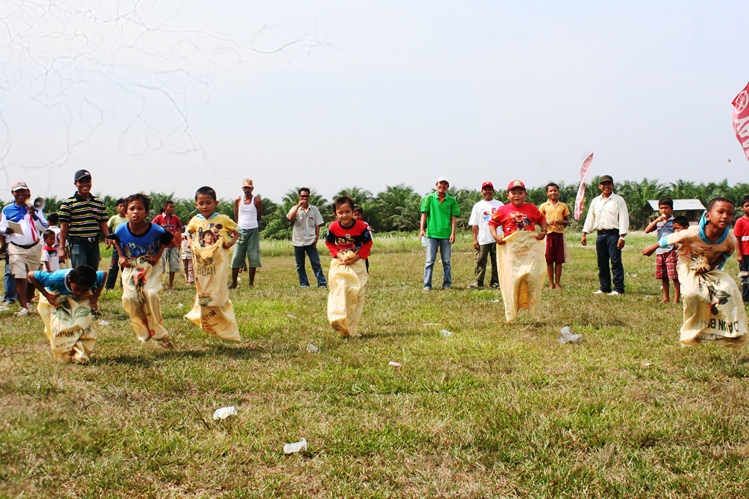
Sack race, a popular independence day game conducted by children

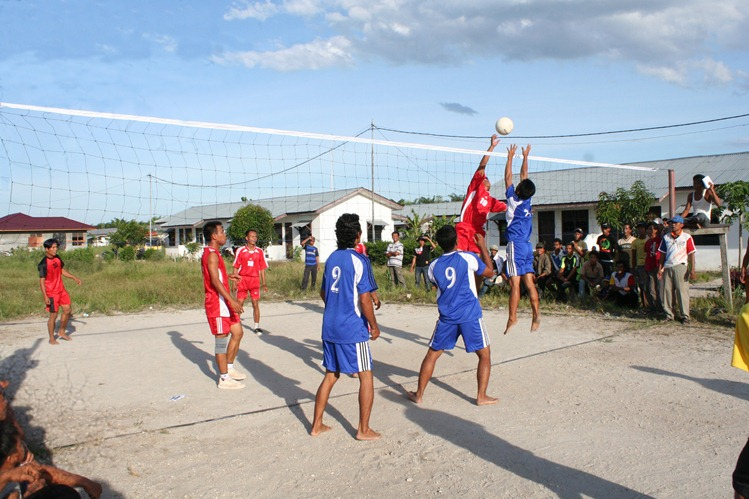
A volleyball competition commemorating independence day

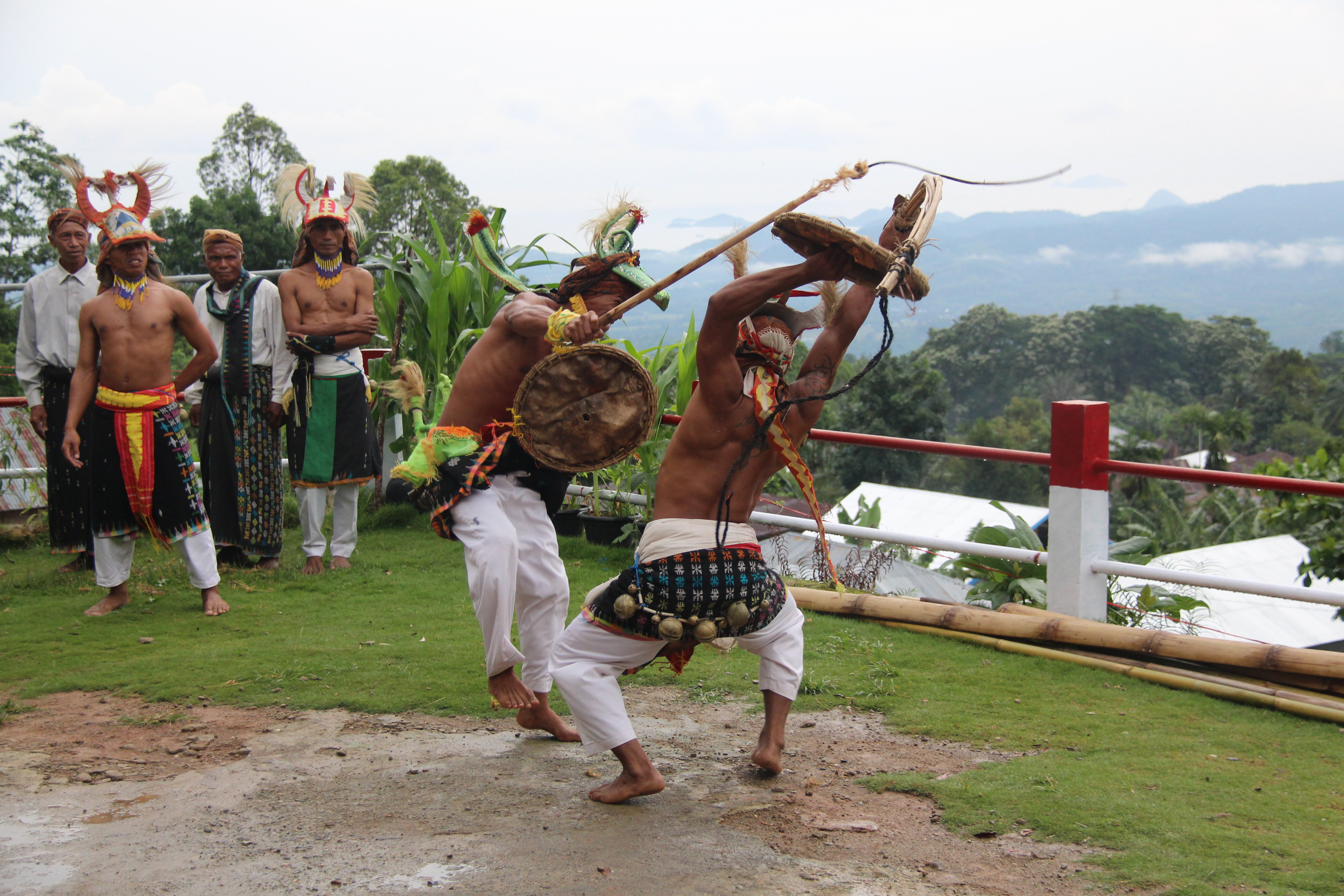
A Caci war dance from Manggarai, East Nusa Tenggara taking place commemorating independence day

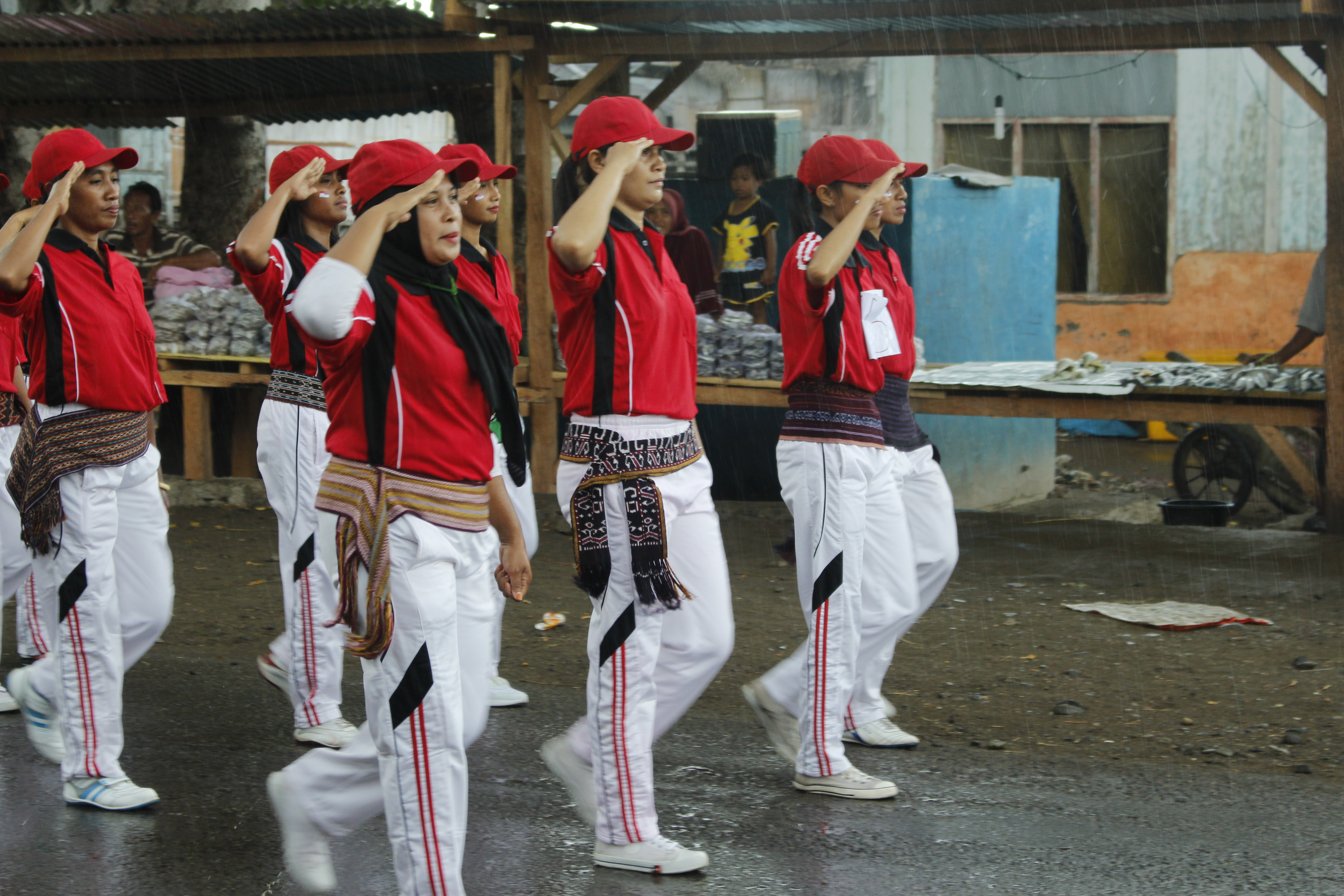
Another popular adult independence day competition known as Gerak Jalan (Marching) competition

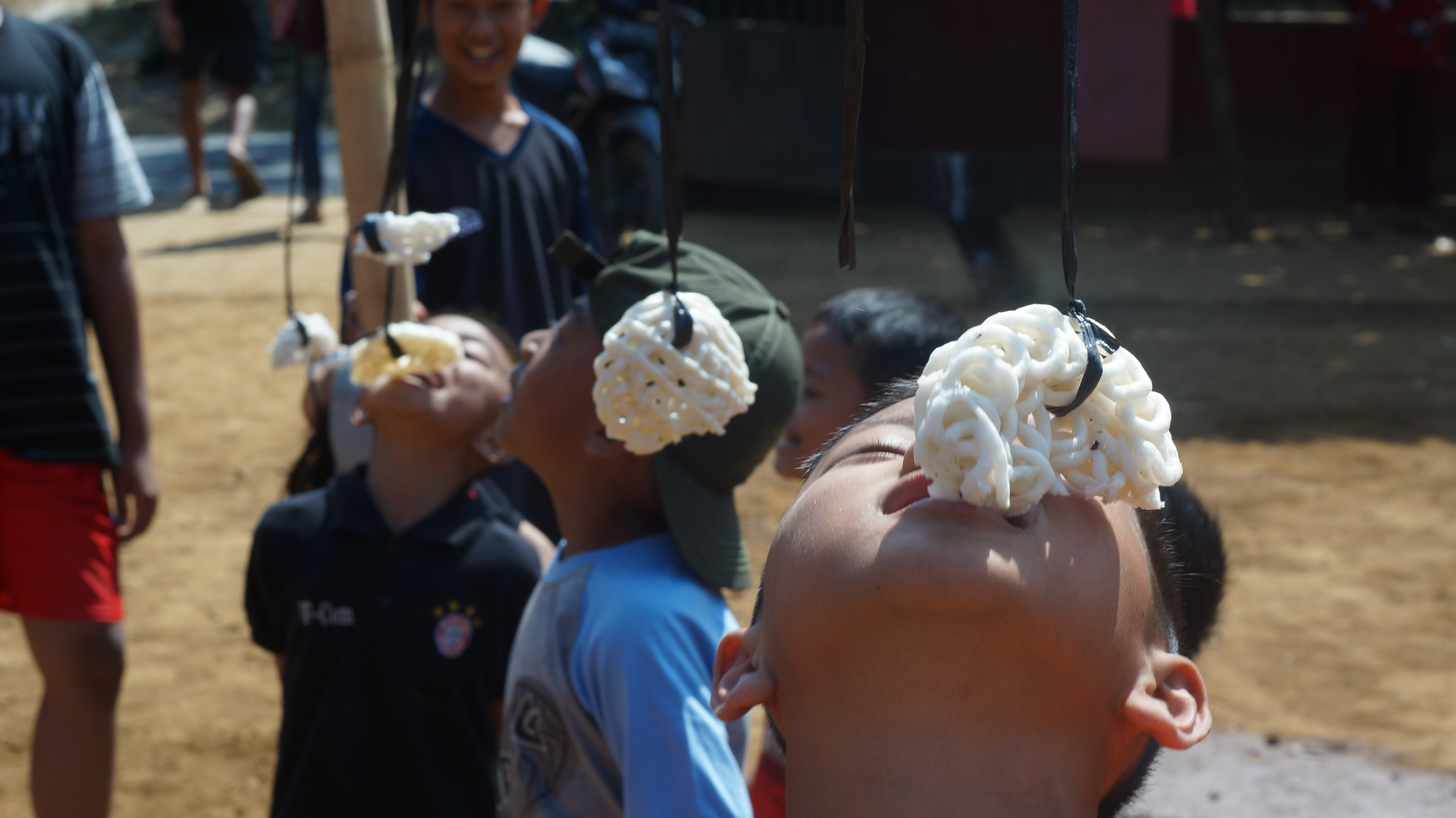
The popular children's cracker eating competition while their hands being tied to the back

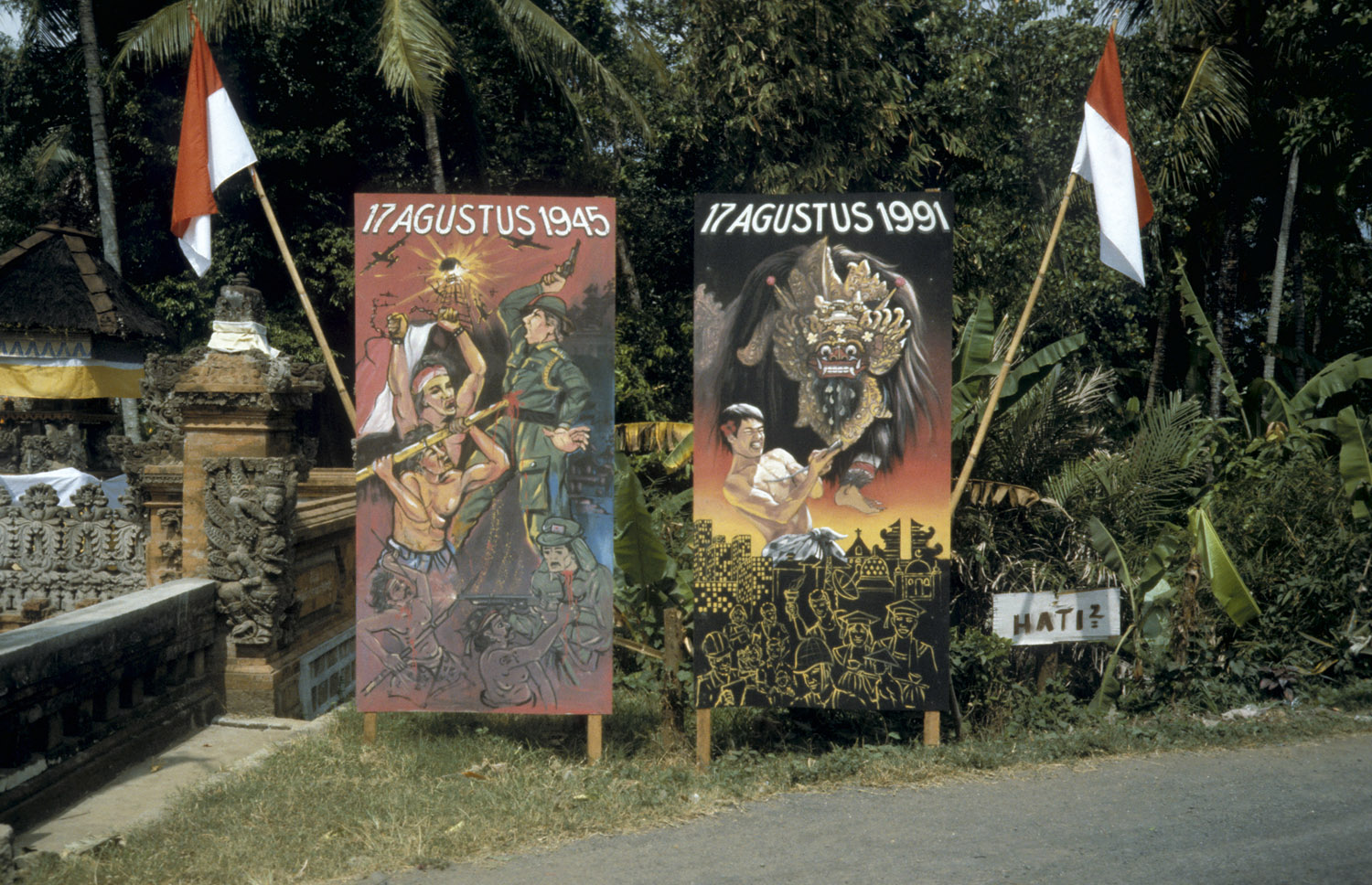
A roadside painting to commemorate the independence day, taken in 1992

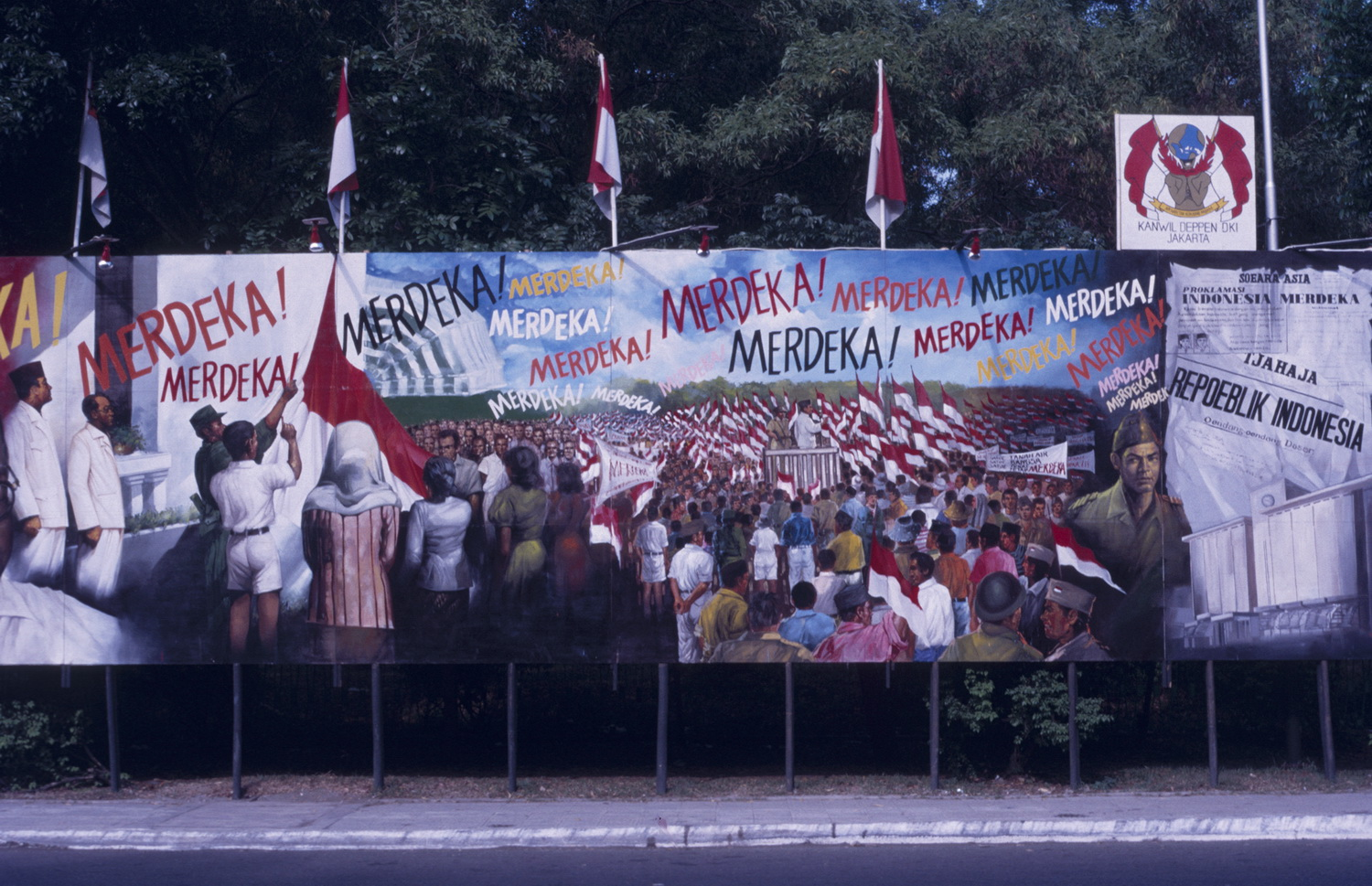
A road-side painting in Jakarta celebrating and commemorating the 40th Anniversary of the Independence Day of Indonesia in 1985

== Themes and logos ==
Independence Day themes and logos are announced by the central government to accompany the annual independence day which alternately changes every year. The annual theme was first introduced during the 60th anniversary in 2005. The first official logo of the Independence Day was introduced in the 50th anniversary in 1995. Logos have been determined through a design contest held by the government (through the Ministry of State Secretariat and the Ministry of Creative Economy) and the Indonesian Graphic Designers Association (ADGI) since 2016.

Year	Logo	Theme		Reference
Year	Logo	Indonesian original	English translation	Reference
1995		No official theme		
1996		No official theme		
1997		No official theme		
1998		No official theme		
1999		No official theme		
2000		No official theme		
2001		No official theme		
2002		No official theme		
2003		No official theme		
2004		No official theme		
2005		Dengan Semangat Proklamasi 1945, Kita Perkokoh Persatuan Dan Kebersamaan Menuju Indonesia yang Aman, Adil, Demokratis, dan Sejahtera	With the Spirit of the 1945 Proclamation, We Strengthen Unity and Togetherness Towards a Safe, Fair, Democratic, and Prosperous Indonesia	
2006		Dengan Semangat Proklamasi 17 Agustus 1945, Kita Tingkatkan Rasa Kebangsaan dan Kebersamaan untuk Membangun Indonesia yang Bersatu, Aman, Adil, Demokratis, dan Sejahtera	With the Spirit of the Proclamation of 17 August 1945, We Increase the Sense of Nationalism and Togetherness to Build a Unified, Safe, Fair, Democratic, and Prosperous Indonesia	
2007		Dengan Semangat Persatuan dan Etos Kerja, Kita Percepat Pertumbuhan Ekonomi dan Penanggulangan Kemiskinan untuk Mewujudkan Keadilan dan Kesejahteraan Bagi Rakyat Indonesia	With the Spirit of Unity and Work Ethics, We Accelerate Economic Growth and Poverty Reduction to Materialize the Justice and Prosperity for the Indonesian People	
2008		Dengan Semangat Proklamasi 17 Agustus 1945, Kita Lanjutkan Pembangunan Ekonomi Menuju Peningkatan Kesejahteraan Rakyat, serta Kita Perkuat Ketahanan Nasional Menghadapi Tantangan Global	With the Spirit of the Proclamation of 17 August 1945, We Resume Economic Development Towards the Enhancement of People's Welfare, and We Strengthen National Resilience in Facing Global Challenges	
2009		Dengan Semangat Proklamasi 17 Agustus 1945, Kita Tingkatkan Kedewasaan Kehidupan Berpolitik dan Berdemokrasi serta Percepatan Pemulihan Ekonomi Nasional Menuju Indonesia yang Bersatu, Aman, Adil, Demokratis, dan Sejahtera	With the Spirit of the Proclamation of 17 August 1945, We Increase Maturity in Political and Democratic Lives and Acceleration of National Economic Recovery Towards a Unified, Safe, Fair, Democratic, and Prosperous Indonesia	
2010		Dengan Semangat Proklamasi 17 Agustus 1945, Kita Sukseskan Reformasi Gelombang Kedua, untuk Terwujudnya Kehidupan Berbangsa yang Makin Sejahtera, Makin Demokratis, dan Makin Berkeadilan	With the Spirit of the Proclamation of 17 August 1945, We Succeeds the Second Wave of Reformation, to Materialize a More Prosperous, More Democratic, and More Equitable National Life	
2011		Dengan Semangat Proklamasi 17 Agustus 1945, Kita Tingkatkan Kesadaran Hidup dalam ke-Bhinneka-an untuk Kokohkan Persatuan NKRI, Kita Sukseskan Kepemimpinan Indonesia dalam Forum ASEAN untuk Kokohkan Solidaritas ASEAN	With the Spirit of the Proclamation of 17 August 1945, We Enhance Life Awareness in the Diversity to Strengthen the Unity of the Unitary State of the Republic of Indonesia, We Succeed Indonesia's Leadership in the ASEAN Forum to Strengthen ASEAN Solidarity	
2012		Dengan Semangat Proklamasi 17 Agustus 1945, Kita Bekerja Keras untuk Kemajuan Bersama, Kita Tingkatkan Pemerataan Hasil-hasil Pembangunan untuk Keadilan Sosial Bagi Seluruh Rakyat Indonesia	With the Spirit of the Proclamation of 17 August 1945, We Work Hard for Common Progress, We Improve Equitable Development Results for Social Justice for all of Indonesian People	
2013		Mari Kita Jaga Stabilitas Politik dan Pertumbuhan Ekonomi Kita Guna Meningkatkan Kesejahteraan Rakyat	Let's Keep Our Political Stability and Economic Growth to Improve People's Welfare	
2014		Dengan Semangat Proklamasi 17 Agustus 1945, Kita Dukung Suksesi Kepemimpinan Nasional Hasil Pemilu 2014 Demi Kelanjutan Pembangunan Menuju Indonesia yang Makin Maju dan Sejahtera	With the Spirit of the Proclamation of 17 August 1945, We Support the Succession of National Leadership (from the) Results of the 2014 Election for the Continuation of Development Towards a More Advanced and Prosperous Indonesia	
2015		Ayo Kerja	Let's Work	
2016		Kerja Nyata	Real Work	
2017		Kerja Bersama	Working Together	
2018		Kerja Kita Prestasi Bangsa	Our Work, Achievement of the Nation	
2019		SDM Unggul, Indonesia Maju (formerly Menuju Indonesia Unggul)	Superior Human Resources, an Advanced Indonesia (formerly "Towards a Superior Indonesia")	
2020		Indonesia Maju	Indonesia Advances	
2021		Indonesia Tangguh, Indonesia Tumbuh	A Resilient and Growing Indonesia	
2022		Pulih Lebih Cepat, Bangkit Lebih Kuat	Recover Faster, Rising Stronger	
2023		Terus Melaju untuk Indonesia Maju	Keep Moving Forward for an Advanced Indonesia	
2024		Nusantara Baru, Indonesia Maju	New Nusantara, Advanced Indonesia	
2025		Bersatu Berdaulat, Rakyat Sejahtera, Indonesia Maju	United and Sovereign, Prosperous People, Advanced Indonesia	
2026		Indonesia Berdaulat, Adil, dan Makmur	A Sovereign, Just, and Prosperous Indonesia	

== See also ==
- Indonesian National Revolution
- Merdeka
- Hari Merdeka (Malaysia)
