= Bagani =

Filipino nobility

The bagani or magani were the class of warrior-leaders of various Lumad ethnic groups of the island of Mindanao, Philippines. Bagani were most notably integral to the traditional society and government of the Mandaya, Mansaka, Manobo, and Bagobo people. They usually acquired their status through bravery in battle, fortitude, physical strength, and most importantly, natural charisma and leadership skills. Various bagani of the past have become mythologized as heroes in their communities.

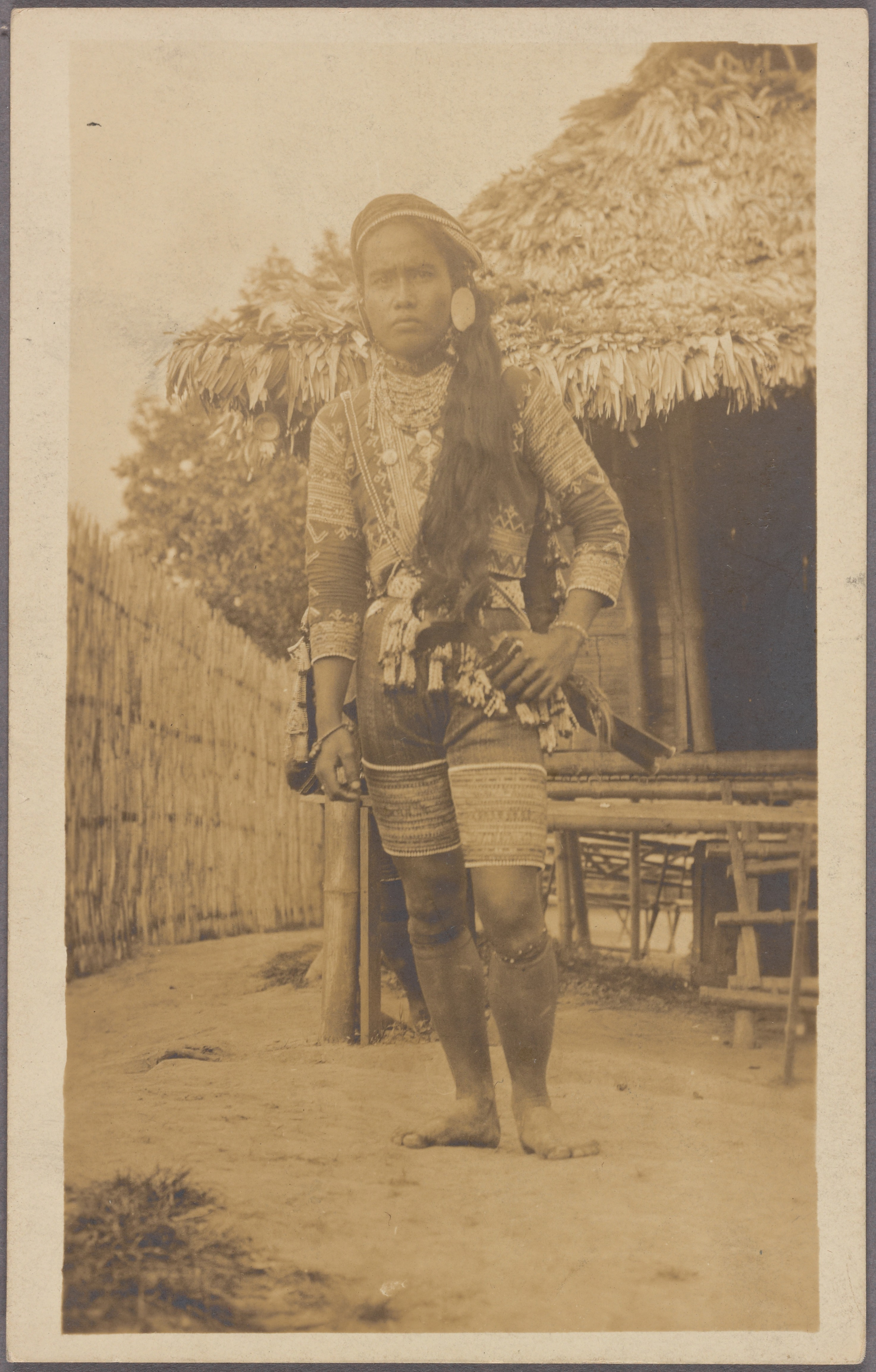
Datu Bulon, a 19-year old bagani of the Bagobo people in the St. Louis World's Fair (1904)

Bagani were datu: they had absolute rule over their particular settlements, ranking even higher than the baylan (female shamans). But their actions are still subject to the opinions of the public as well as to the advisory council (itself composed of elder former bagani), which limits abuse of authority. Bagani also enforced the laws in their domains, by capturing and executing criminals. They also led various rituals to the spirits as well as protected the places which were sacred to spirits.

To become a bagani, one must have killed a set number of enemies in battle. The number varies by locality and ethnic group and ranges from five to as many as thirty. Though the status of the bagani was not hereditary and any commoner can become a bagani, bagani often traced their lineage through other notable bagani. In situations where a ruling bagani dies suddenly, the most suitable son of a bagani can be commonly chosen as a candidate for the next bagani by the advisory council. But they would still have to fulfill the requirements before becoming one. In cases of challengers or candidates who failed to meet the requirements but still refused to withdraw their eligibility, the selection would have to be made by battle between the candidates and their supporters.

The bagani were distinguished from other warriors by their clothing (including the headgear), which varies by ethnic group. They regularly engaged in headhunting and captive-taking raids on enemy villages as well as defend their own settlements from enemy raids of the same nature. They commanded a group of warriors (averaging at around forty to forty-five men). To become a warrior, a commoner must also have killed at least three people in battle.

The bagani system survived during the Spanish colonial period of the Philippines (1565–1898) due to the limited ability of Spanish colonizers to penetrate deeper into the interiors of the island of Mindanao. But the bagani system and the constant inter-village warfare were actively suppressed during the American colonial period of the Philippines (1898–1946), finally disappearing completely by the 1930s.

== See also ==
- Timawa
- Maharlika
- Maginoo
- Datu
- Batok
