= Merdeka =

Indonesian and Malay term for "independent" or "free"

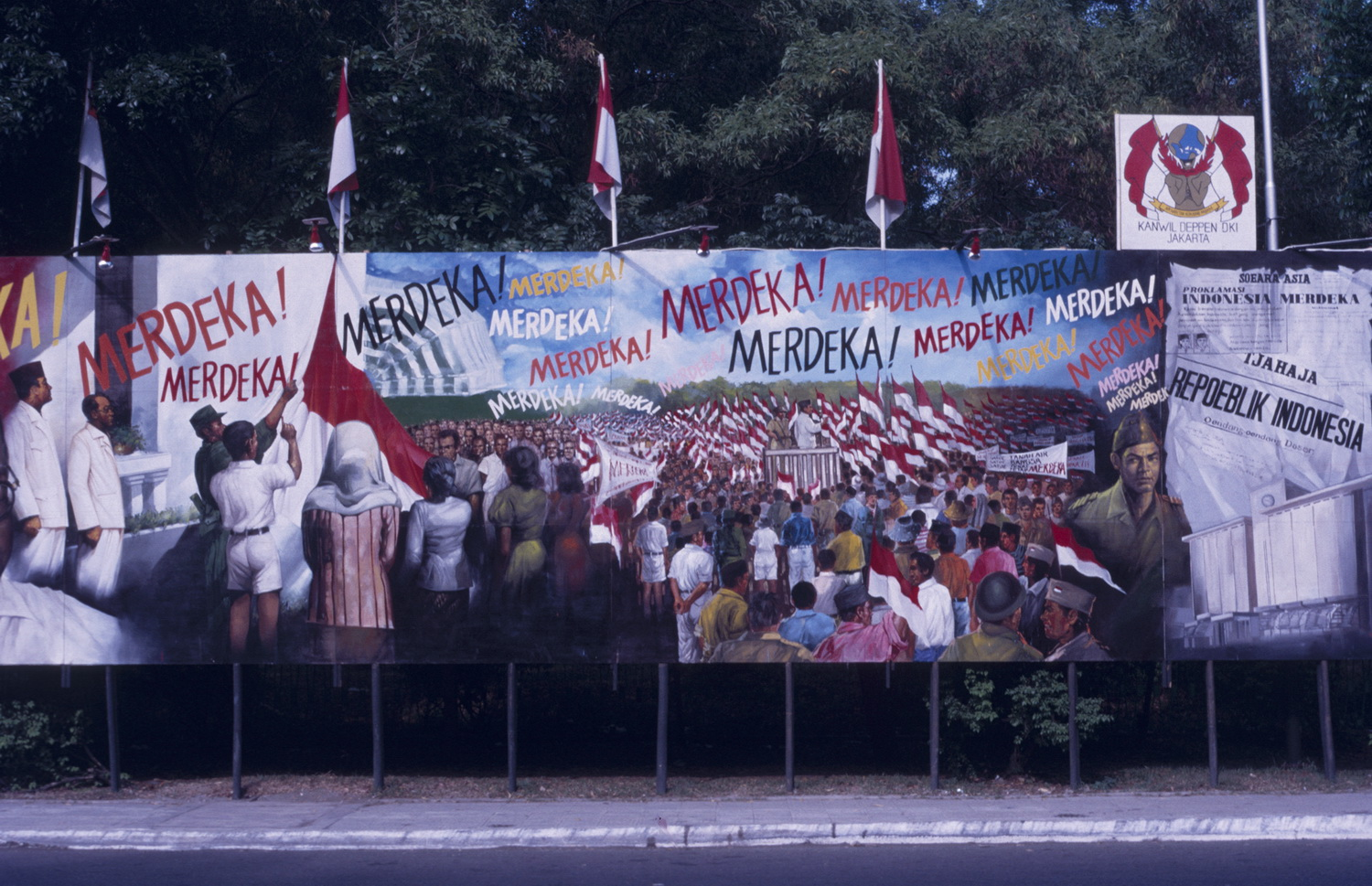
A 1985 painting in Indonesia commemorating the Independence of Indonesia bearing the words "Merdeka!"

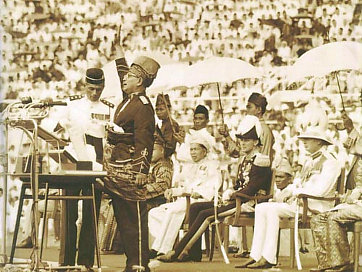
Tunku Abdul Rahman as he proclaimed Malaysian independence on 31 August 1957, chanting "Merdeka!" seven times

Merdeka (Jawi: مرديک; Indonesian: [mərˈdɛka], Malay: [mərdeka]) is a term in Indonesian and Malay which means "independent" or "free". It is derived from the Sanskrit maharddhika (महर्द्धिक) meaning "rich, prosperous, and powerful". In the Malay Archipelago, this term had acquired the meaning of a freed slave. The term is also used in other Indonesian languages.

The term Mardijker is a Dutch corruption of the Portuguese version of the original Sanskrit words and was used to designate former Portuguese and Dutch slaves from India in the East Indies, known as Mardijkers, whence the Malay meaning of "free(dom)" is derived. The Mardijkers were former Catholic slaves brought from India and the East Indies, who were liberated by the Dutch if they abandoned Catholicism and joined the Dutch Reformed Church.

The term was used by the anti-colonialist and pro-independence movements in the colonial territories of the Dutch East Indies, British Malaya, and the Straits Settlements. It became a rallying call for those demanding independence from the colonial administrations of the Netherlands and United Kingdom. In the southern Philippine island of Mindanao, the Moro people belonging to major ethnolinguistic groups of Meranaw, Maguindanaw, and Iranun, use maradeka in the same meaning as freedom or liberation and a political group there is called Maradeka. The Pampangan term mardíka (also spelled mardíkas) and the Tagalog maharlika have the same Sanskrit etymology as the Malay merdeka and means freeman, libertos or freedman in classical Philippine society.

== Indonesia ==
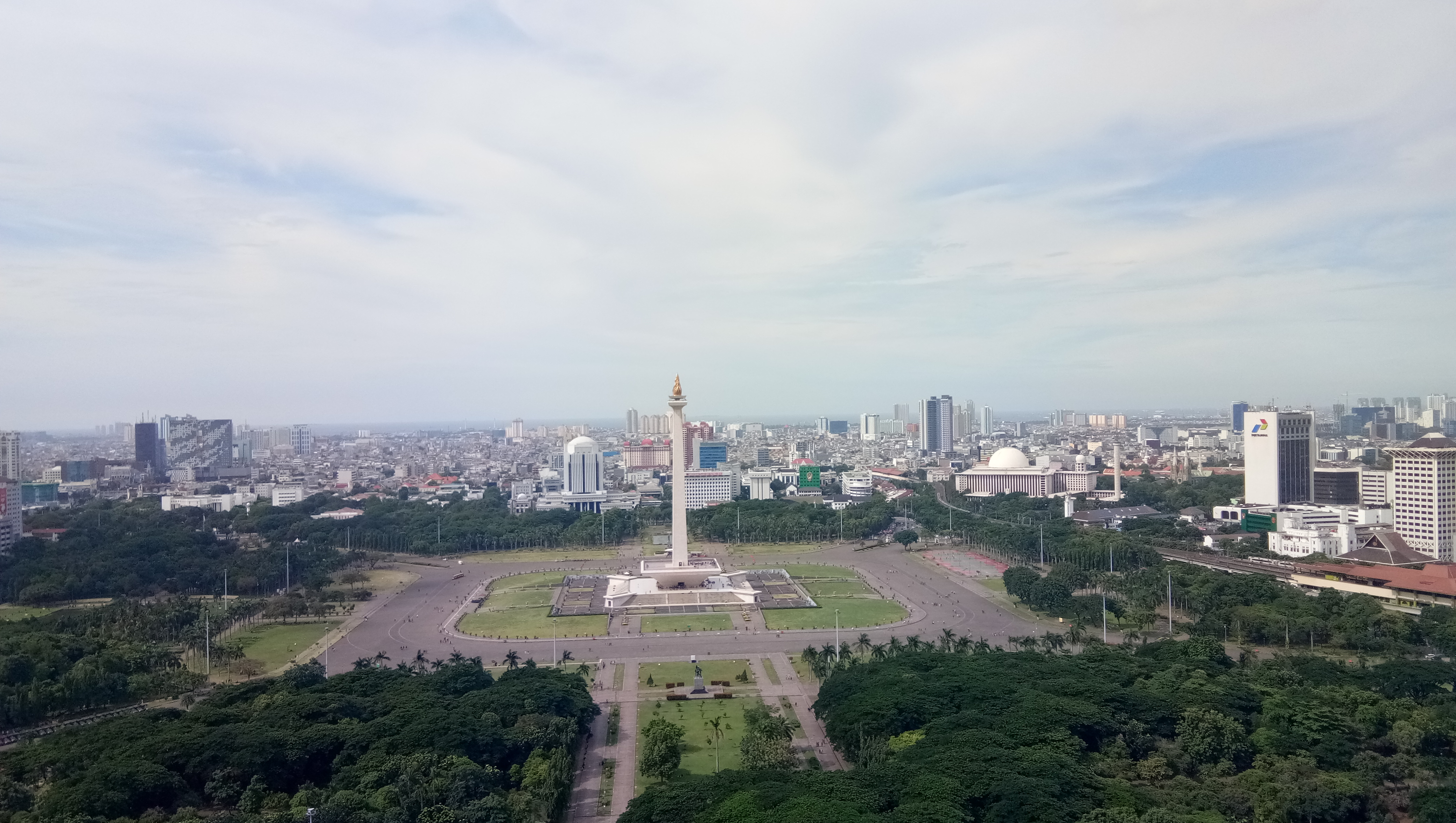
The National Monument stands in the middle of Medan Merdeka or Independence Square, Jakarta, Indonesia.

The term "merdeka" was used in Indonesia in a similar way to designate freedom from the Dutch colonial government during the struggle for independence in the 1940s. Republic of Indonesia declared its Hari Kemerdekaan Indonesia or Proclamation of Indonesian Independence on 17 August 1945, and it has become national holiday and commemorated annually ever since.

During the struggle of independence in 1945 to 1949, it was used as a national salute of victory and honor, by raising open palms as high as the head and shouting out loud "Merdeka!" From here many slogans came, such as "Sekali Merdeka tetap Merdeka!" (Freedom once and for all) or "Merdeka atau Mati" (Freedom or death). This was intended to raise the morale of all the people of Indonesia to continue to fight against the Dutch and the Allied forces trying to re-establish control over Indonesia; it was so important that even it became a Government Edict on 31 August 1945.

On 1 September it was mentioned by the president Sukarno in his short speech:

"Since today we will cry out loud, "Merdeka!" Continue on that loud battle cry, as the soul calls out loud for freedom! A soul of freedom, one of fighting and working spirit! TO FIGHT AND TO WORK! Prove it!"

"Merdeka" is also used in Indonesia Raya, the national anthem of Indonesia:

Indonesia Raya, merdeka, merdeka! Tanahku, negeriku yang kucinta. Indonesia Raya, merdeka, merdeka! Hiduplah Indonesia Raya!
("Indonesia the Great, be free, be free! My land, my country which I love. Indonesia the Great, be free, be free! Long live Indonesia the Great!")

The name "Merdeka" is used as the name of Indonesian important places, such as Merdeka Palace and Merdeka Square in central Jakarta, also Merdeka Building in Bandung. "Merdeka" is also included in several mass media names, e.g. in newspapers (such as Merdeka, Rakyat Merdeka, Suara Merdeka) and websites (such as Merdeka.com news portal).

Nowadays the Acehnese and West Papuan autonomy movements currently use the term to express the concept of freedom, and the meaning of the term ranges from greater freedom to outright political independence. The major autonomy movement in Aceh, the Free Aceh Movement has the term in its name (Gerakan Aceh Merdeka), as does the major armed independence group in West Papua, the Free Papua Movement (Organisasi Papua Merdeka).

== Malaysia ==
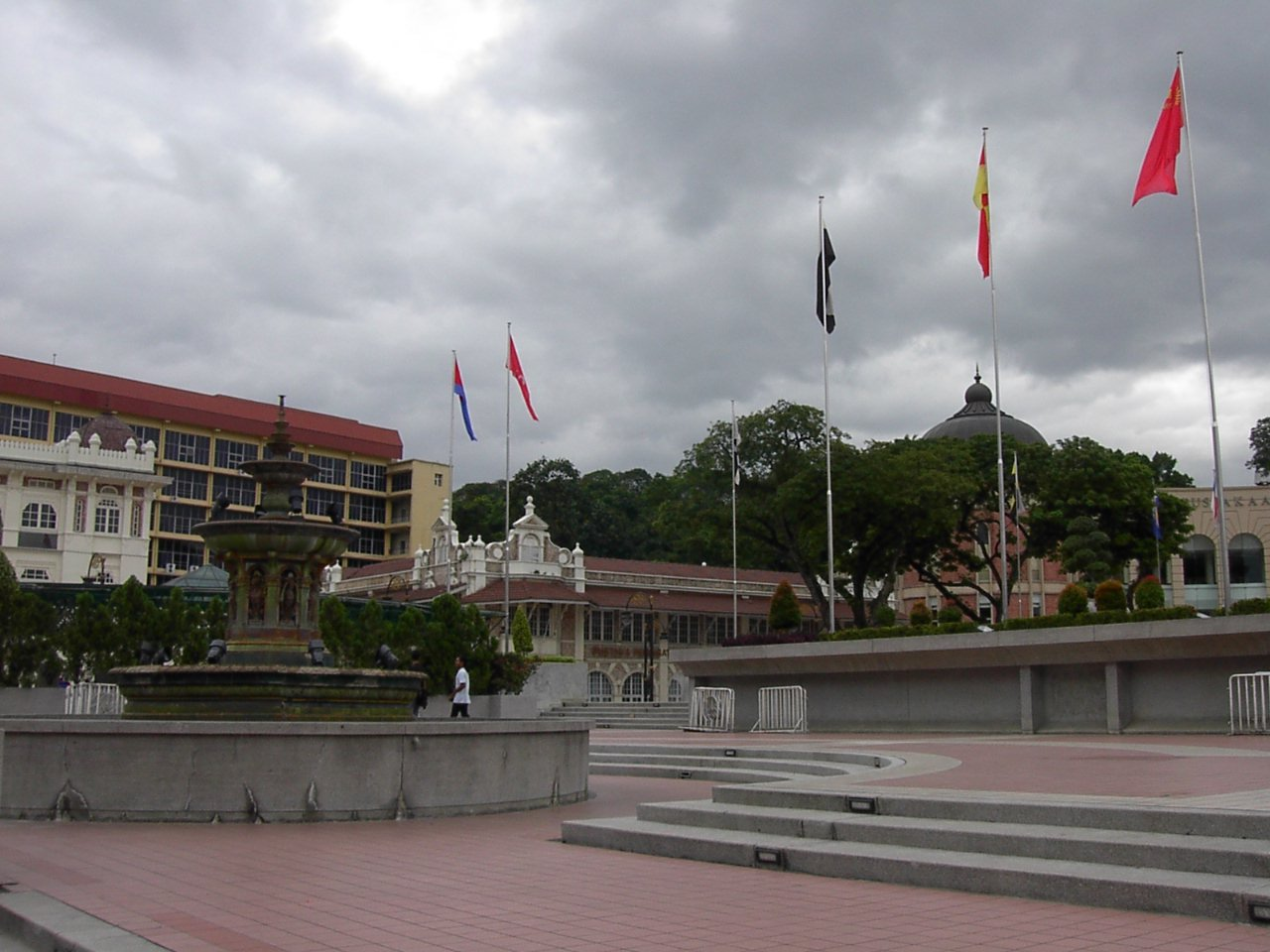
Merdeka Square in Kuala Lumpur.

Tunku Abdul Rahman, later the inaugural Malaysian Prime Minister, declared Malayan independence in 1957 with seven shouts of "Merdeka". The cry is referenced in the Malaysian national holiday, Hari Merdeka, commemorating Malaya's independence on 31 August 1957, and Dataran Merdeka (Independence Square) where the first ceremony raising the flag of Malaya was held following independence.

Malaysia was formed by the 1963 merger of Malaya, North Borneo, Sarawak and Singapore. North Borneo and Sarawak in northern Borneo were to officially join to form Malaysia on 31 August 1963 but due to opposition from Indonesia and the Philippines and to allow the United Nations team time to conduct referendums in North Borneo and Sarawak regarding their participation in a new federation, the date was postponed to 16 September, which now celebrated as Malaysia Day.

The Merdeka 118 megatall skyscraper was made to resemble the "Merdeka" gesture used by Tunku Abdul Rahman in 1957.

== Singapore ==
In the context of Singapore, Merdeka usually refers to the gaining of self-rule and self-government from the United Kingdom in the 1950s, as imperialism in Asia slowly declined. It usually does not refer to Singapore's separation from Malaysia in 1965, which followed its merger with Malaya, Sabah and Sarawak on 16 September 1963 after having held the 1962 national referendum.

The Constitution of Singapore had been amended in 1953 following recommendations by the Rendel Commission, creating a 32-seat Legislative Assembly of Singapore to replace the Legislative Council of Singapore. The Legislative Assembly would become the predecessor to the modern Parliament of Singapore. The following Singapore general election of 1955 had members that were elected by the population for the first time become the majority in Singapore's legislature. Previously, only six members of the Legislative Council were elected — the rest were appointed. This however did not satisfy individuals calling for full self-government at least in the matter of domestic affairs.

The call for Merdeka was a growing tension between progressivism and radicalism, cooperation and hostility towards the British. David Saul Marshall of the Labour Front narrowly won the Singapore general election of 1955, but being anticolonialist, tended to be a vocal opponent of the British rule. As such, the British found it hard to work out a compromise. A petition was started in 1956 which collected the signatures of 167,000 — a vast portion of the electorate in that era — in a petition that demanded Merdeka.

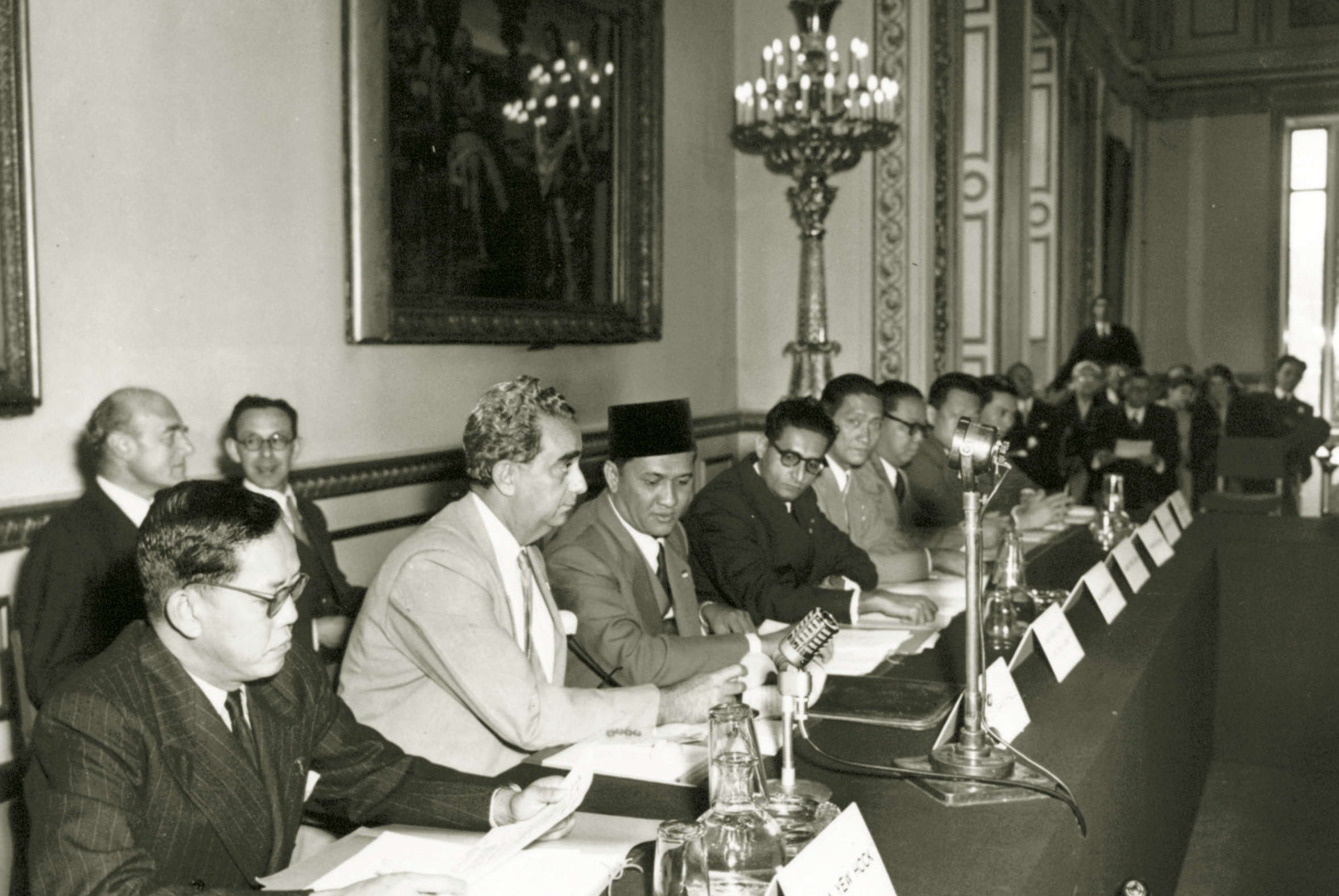
The Singaporean delegation in London, 1956

During the Merdeka Talks of 1956, the year before Malaya's independence, the British agreed to grant Singapore self-government over domestic issues, while the British retained control of finance and the military. This seemed to satisfy Marshall initially, but the negotiation later broke down when the British refused to turn over internal security to the local government. The British felt that Marshall was not doing enough to counter the threats of the communist insurgency and the Malayan Communist Party (MCP) which had sparked the Malayan Emergency. The march towards independence was stalled and Marshall resigned in 1956 making good on his earlier pledge that he would step down in the case of failure.

Another Labour Front leader Lim Yew Hock took over as Singapore's Chief Minister and continued the effort to push for independence. Lim then undertook harsh measures against the communists demonstrating that his administration was willing to take a tough stance to safeguard internal security. In the Chinese middle schools riots of 1956, some nine hundred people were arrested. Leading a negotiation delegation consisting of several Singapore political leaders from various parties, Lim managed to convince the British to grant Singapore Merdeka by amending and revamping its Constitution in 1958 to allow for a fully elected legislature which would form an internal government with complete autonomy over domestic affairs. This government was formed following the Singapore general election of 1959, but the Labour Front lost as Lim's harsh techniques had alienated large portions of the electorate.

== Philippines ==
The Philippines has the longest-running struggle for the Moro people right to self-determination. The cry for "merdeka or maradeka" began in 1968 when Datu Udtog Matalam announced the formation of the Mindanao Independence Movement (MIM) and the Muslim fundamentalist Ansar el Islam led by prominent Muslim leaders such as Philippine Muslim Senator Dr. Ahmad Domocao Alonto while leading the Islamic revival movement also supported the formation of the secessionist Moro National Liberation Front (MNLF). The over four decades of Moro struggle asserts freedom from Philippine colonialism as argued by Moro leaders Prof. Nur Misuari of the MNLF and the late Ustadz Salamat Hashim of the Moro Islamic Liberation Front (MILF). Until the present, the struggle for freedom and independence continues among the younger Moro generation. At the legal front, the Maradeka (literally means freedom) became seen at the forefront of a nonviolent political movement enjoying the democratic space afforded to many political groups and activists in the Philippines.

Analytically looking at the history of long peace process since 1975, while East Timor was able to attain full self governance thru a United Nations brokered Determination Vote and Free Aceh Movement acceded to Norway-brokered peace talks, the Moro rebel groups underwent a series of protracted peace and a never-ending peace process believed to be employed only as a counterinsurgency strategy of the Philippine government and not meant sincerely to end hostilities in Mindanao. These allegedly deceptive policies of the government allegedly exasperated young Moros and students, which led some to join extremist groups, such as the Abu Sayyaf, and mount a violent attacks against the Philippine government. Several incidents in the rejection by the MILF of the Philippine government's counterproposal to the former proposal for compromise accession to substate formula will suspend and further stall the peace negotiations.

== See also ==
- Hari Kemerdekaan Republik Indonesia, a national holiday celebrated every 17 August, commemorating the Proclamation of Indonesian Independence from Dutch rule
- Hari Merdeka, the date of Malaysia's independence from British rule
- Mabuhay, the equivalent cheer used in the Philippines
- Maradeka, an Islamic political organisation at Bangsamoro that advocates autonomy
- Merdeka 118, mega-skyscraper
