= Umbul-umbul =

Type of flag from Java and Bali, Indonesia

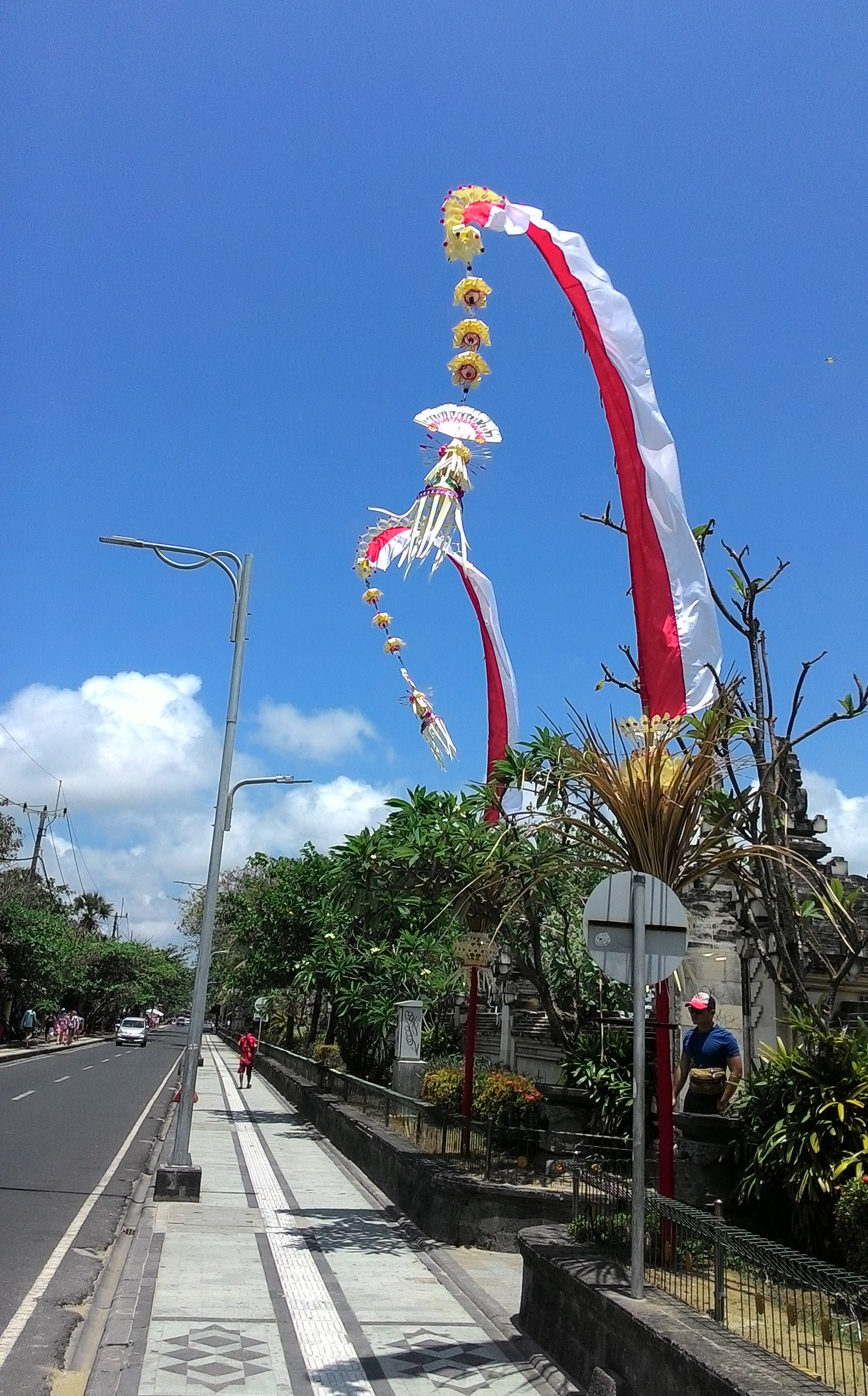
Traditional Balinese red and white umbul-umbul are curved and decorated with janur (young coconut leaf).

Umbul-umbul, also called rérontek or, archaically, tunggul, are a type of flag or pennant made of a strip of cloth whose longer side is attached to a pole. They are used in the traditional culture of Java and Bali, Indonesia, where they are carried in festivals and serve other decorative purposes. Red and white Umbul-umbuls are raised throughout Indonesia along streets in August to commemorate the Indonesian independence day.

Traditional umbul-umbul in Java and Bali are usually curved, because they are posted on bamboo poles which are flexible and swing in the wind. Traditional umbul-umbul are akin to Balinese penjor, raised during Galungan festival. Penjor are curved bamboo poles decorated with woven janur, young coconut leaf that is also the material to make ketupat woven pouches. The tips are often decorated with woven janur ornaments. Modern umbul-umbul are usually fixed to straight metal flagpoles.

== Etymology ==
Modern umbul-umbul are posted on straight metal pole.

A Sundanese language dictionary of 1862 translates the word "umbul-umbul" as "a banner; any signal, as a flag or other object, hoisted so as to be seen at a distance. Banners carried about the person of native chiefs. A small flag attached to a spear." It also notes that the same word, pronounced differently, means "to come in sight, to show up".

== See also ==
- Nobori, slightly similar Japanese vertical banner
