= Maradeka =

Pro-democracy Islamic political organization

- Formation: 2000
- Type: Political organization, Alliance
- Headquarters: Manila
- Location: Mindanao, Philippines
- Region served: Bangsamoro
- Secretary General: Datu Nash Pangadapun
- Main organ: The Majlis and The Permanent Secretariat

Maradeka is a pro-democracy Islamic political organization which espouses non-violent political action, and is based in the Philippines. The organization has been active against a backdrop of over 40 years of armed Muslim insurgency, mounted by the Moro National Liberation Front (MNLF) and Moro Islamic Liberation Front (MILF) in their quest for self-rule. These groups emerged following popular dissent with the Philippine government, and their treatment of the Muslim minority as second class citizens, which caused extensive suffering. These years of social, economic, and political inequities are known as the 'Mindanao problem'.

The term Maradeka is rooted in the Malay word merdeka, meaning freedom or liberation, and was adopted as the name of the umbrella freedom alliance of 72 Bangsamoro civil and political organizations. These include Task Force Mindanao, Alternative Muslim Mindanao Entrepreneurial Dev't, Inc (AMMENDI), Basilan Solidarity, Organization of Maguindanaon and Iranon, Bangsamoro Consultative Assembly, Bangsamoro Supreme Council of Ulama (BSCU), Maradeka Youth, Bangsa Iranun Muslim Advocates for Peace, Inc., Ittihadun As-Shabab Al-Muslimeen, Karitan Foundation Inc., Mindanao Peace Observers, Manila Peace Zone Community Association (MAPZCA), and Mindanao War Victims.

Maradeka derives its strength from grassroot communities, citizens action and consensus building through regional people's assemblies (RPA) held in various regions in the Philippines, such as Mindanao and Sulu, Central Luzon and Calabarzon. In addition, the group articulates voices of the marginalized Moro people, democratic dialogues, participatory community consultations (shura), social and political advocacy campaigns, and launches mass actions to organise protests, appeals, and demands on various legal issues and policies affecting Muslim people in the Philippines.

== Moro War for Secession from the Philippines ==
Muslims in the Southern Philippines, known as Moro or Bangsamoro, claim to have preceded the Philippine Commonwealth when the United States Government granted self-rule in 1935. This followed demands for independence by Filipino politicians, led by Manuel L. Quezon.

The Bangsamoro people have established, independent Sultanates, such as the Sultanate of Sulu, Sultanate of Maguindanao and the Pat A Pangampong of Ranaw (Federal States of Ranaw). These Moro Sultanates mounted a colonial resistance known as the Spanish–Moro Wars by Dr. Cesar Adib Majul in his book 'History of the Muslims in the Philippines'. This was carried out as a resistance to the incursion of Spanish Colonial power in 1571 and the annexation of the Mindanao, Sulu, and Palawan islands by the United States in the Moro–American War (1899–1913). This followed the Spanish–American War (1899–1902), and the Moros' resistance to Japanese invasion in World War II.

The last four decades of Philippine–Bangsamoro conflict are the most recent, but not the final stage of Moro Wars. The modern Muslim revolt can be seen in an unorganized uprising in early 1950 (the Kamlon revolt) and during 1968 in the organized secessionist Mindanao Independence Movement of Udtog Matalam, which jolted the Philippine government.

=== Historical roots of the Maradeka organization ===
The infamous Jabidah Massacre, on March 18, 1968, which saw Moro army recruits allegedly massacred, was the catalyst for the broader Moro Insurgency in the Philippines. Around this time, the Sabah-trained "Black Shirts" emerged who fought the Philippine militias called "Ilaga," they came to be known later as the Moro National Liberation Front seeking to establish what it called the independent Bangsamoro Republik.

Approximately one month after Ferdinand Marcos' declaration of Martial Law on September 21, 1972, Moro rebels stormed Philippine Constabulary camps and government installations in Marawi City in the historic Marawi revolt. In addition, they overran the state university calling for Muslim secession. Following this the Moro revolution rapidly became widespread all over Mindanao.

A Philippine Army general, Fortunato Abat, has described how the Philippines almost lost Mindanao.

The freedom-loving Moro people lived up to the Malay tradition of enjoying a collective lifestyle, free from alien subjugation, control, or dominance. The indigenous human rights to life and self-determination were strongly defended by early Moro leaders, chieftains, datus, Sultans, and Moro freedom fighters since this point in time.

The American soldiers attested to the ferociousness of the Moro warriors in the battlefield. In continuing the struggle, Maradeka emerged as non-violent political organization as an alternative to armed struggle mounted by the Moro National Liberation Front (MNLF) during their secessionist campaign beginning in 1968 and sustained by its breakaway groups, namely: MNLF Reformist Group led by Kumander Dimas Pundato and Moro Islamic Liberation Front (MNLF) led by late Ustadz Salamat Hashim in war for self-rule in Mindanao, the largest southern islands of the Philippines.

The restlessness in the recurrent Mindanao conflict brought Moro political activists and bonded Islamists and pro-democratic political groups of youth and students, academe, professionals, clerics, workers and employees, businessmen, traders, urban poor, overseas contract workers, and women in the push for broader people participation toward peace and democracy in the Philippines.

== Origin of Rising Moro Organization ==
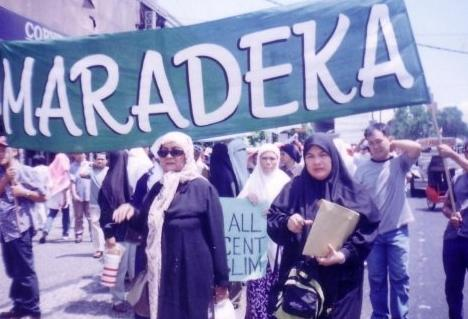
Maradeka women in Human Rights Action

Convenors of Maradeka evolved from the middle of the 1980s during the height of Muslim student activism in Mindanao as new option for peaceful and democratic people participation against the backdrop of Bangsamoro people armed resistance against the repressive and chauvinistic Philippine government of strongman Pres. Marcos. Now, Maradeka as it was formally organized during its Convenor' Assembly in University of the Philippines as mass organization in July 2000, stepped up the broadening and heightening of mass struggle in the attainment of its lofty aspiration for freedom, justice, human rights, and the assertion of Bangsamoro people's right to self-determination.

Maradeka had been active in advancing Moro civil and political rights and the advocacy of peace cognizant of the United Nations International covenants on ECOSOC and Civil and Political Rights. The unabated political repression, oppression, and discrimination resulting to serious violations of human rights, civil liberties, and deprivations of economic, cultural and social rights by the government authorities perpetrated against the Muslims in Mindanao, more popularly known as the Bangsamoro people have caused more public resistance and banded cause-oriented groups to redress collectively these pressing problems confronting them.

Maradeka became active in embarking on direct socio-political action to address the complexities of issues affecting the Muslim communities. The recurrent wars for decades brought thousands in mass poverty and displacement in Mindanao. It believed the war of attrition must come to its end. As Peace Observer, in the peace process between the Government of the Philippines and the Moro Islamic Liberation Front, it sought a "win-win" solution to the Mindanao armed conflict, fought against spoilers of peace and saboteurs and avert impasse of peace talks brokered by Malaysia. If the option for a sub-state formula cannot be met by the Philippine peace panel, the federal option will be viable, or it will seek a "determination vote' to the United Nations as the last option.

== Ideology ==
Maradeka espoused the Islamic Ideology and Islamic democracy. It believed in the core values of freedom and equality as the foundation of human dignity and social justice. Like every Muslim organization, Maradeka asserts in the rhetoric of their leaders of Bangsamoro nationhood and the adherence to the political principles of Islam based on its precepts, namely: Tawhid (Monotheism), Khilafah (Trusteeship), Hakimiyyah (Sovereignty), Risalah (Message), Hukuwat (Brotherhood), and Jihad (Mass Struggle). It looked forward to the resilience of the freedom-loving Bangsamoro people holding to their ancestors tradition that had found strength in the intrinsic value inherent in the social and political life of the Malay people to live free continually resistant to the influences and dominance of colonial powers- Spanish and American.

Its founders in carrying out its part in the Islamic movement propounded that while the universal Muslim Ummah is in the dire state of Darul Harb and the Muslim world is fragmented into nation-states, viewed the Khilafat, the world Islamic government as a utopia. Thus, the Muslim organization find their advocacy of temporal socio-political ideology, Islamic democracy as a transition to absolute realization of comprehensive Islamic way of life and egalitarian state of Darul Islam. The adoption of Islamic democracy and the building of Sharia-based Islamic democratic government found the model in the Islamic political construct from Islamic Republics in Pakistan, Malaysia, and Iran. In advancing the Islamic democratic ideology, it found inspiration from many Muslim political thinkers notably the political works and treatises of Syed Abu Ala Maududi of Jamaat-e-Islami in Pakistan, Abhoud Syed Lingga of Institute of Bangsamoro Studies in the Philippines. It seeks to build a Sharia-based Muslim government and state in Mindanao and Philippines.

The fast Islamic resurgence sweeping the entire Muslim world gradually evolved Maradeka to become another brand of political Islam in the Philippines as it adhered to the Islamic fundamentalist creed of Tauhid: Laa ilaha illaallah, Muhammad Ar-Rasulullah (There is no god but Allah, and Muhammad is the Final Prophet) whereby in the mainstream of the universal Islamic movement its mode of political action embarks on the Islamic democratic struggle to attain its goals. Though the Muslims in the Philippines appeared to be in the minority with Muslim population consisting of about 14 million, it found fraternal relations with the Muslim world, a total population of 1.4 billion. Maradeka joins the Muslim world and the Pan-Islamic movement and toward realization of the Darul Salam, it envisioned the reconstruction of the universal Muslim Ummah.

== Organization and Operation ==
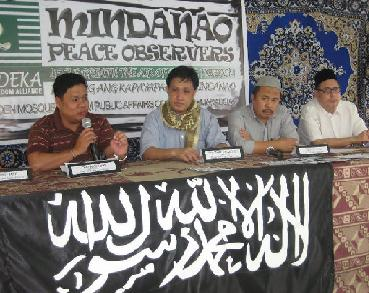
Maradeka Peace Gathering

Maradeka is a uniquely reclusive ideological organization, operating as an Islamic movement but actually a discrete organization, as it is claimed as antithetical to the broad political spectrum and groupings in Philippine politics. Its ideological doctrines do not permit alliances with secular political parties or any of the factions of Philippine's communist groups or its front organization, either the re-affirmist or the rejectionist faction. Maradeka is a cause-oriented mass-based organization with 68 hardline member affiliates from various Moro sectors, regional groups, clerics (ulama), people organizations, civil society, urban community associations, developmental non-government organizations. The Majlis is the Highest Governing Council and The Permanent Secretariat led by the Secretary-General ran the operations of the organization's organs and major action programmes.

Maradeka was seen as a collective street parliamentarians in an open mass movement in the Philippine political scene. As an ideological organization, Maradeka put on its main form of action through democratic dialogues, community consultations (shura), and staged mass actions into the street to demonstrate its protests, public appeals, and demands on various legitimate issues detrimental to the Muslim people. Due to the adverse political environment in the Philippines, Maradeka in support of the MNLF and MILF legitimate struggle has operated vigilantly a non-violent political action albeit cautiously along the steep campaign of the Philippine government against extremism and terrorism.

== Current works, programs and Islamic activities ==
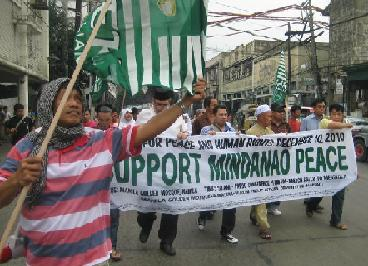
Maradeka March for Peace

Following activities of Maradeka, it endeavored to stand as voice in the defense of the Muslim civil liberties and the human rights protection and the bearer of the people cause for peace, freedom and in advancing non-violent political action as it actively works for the peaceable resolution of the Mindanao problem and empowering people into direct people participation in the building of genuine self-rule in Mindanao and Philippines. It also works in providing and assisting communities in alleviating mass poverty through grass-root education, community development, capability building, and relief operations and contributes significantly in the mutual understanding and co-existence of inter-faith groups and communities toward a harmonious multi-cultural society and send the message of Islam in wisdom, virtues, and good deeds across the Philippine and South East Asia.

In the Maradeka In Action Primer, it has its Programmatic Actions and among its thrust and programs are: Protection of the civil liberties and fundamental human rights of the Muslim communities in cooperation with various human rights groups. It provides necessary professional works in advocacy, documentation, paralegal trainings, education, networking, and humanitarian assistance to victims of human rights abuses and their families through legal and medical services; Empowerment of Muslim Communities. It operationalizes practice of Islam as a comprehensive system and ideology in all facets of life in the Muslim communities and enjoins peaceful, open, and liberation mass struggle (jihadun jamian) in attaining its goals and ideals toward prosperity (aflaha). Da'wah and Tazkiah works is principally adopted as an organizing strategy in building strong Muslim Ummah; People Initiative for Democratic Rights with peaceful campaign in the resolution of Mindanao Problem through active promotion of non-violence and Culture of Peace. It asserts the primacy of recognizing the democratic rights of main stakeholders-the Bangsamoro People as the sole determinant of their political status.

Through its member affiliates it pursues development programs such as a welfare-oriented civic assistance which is primarily responsible in helping alleviate mass poverty, dislocation, lack of medical and health services, and victims of calamities and armed conflict in Mindanao. It institutes cooperative development mechanism to provide self-help and self-reliant assistance to the needy and poor, and displaced families in the urban areas and it established solidarity works with people organizations in the Asia-Pacific and the Middle East who share similar common aspiration and ideals. It also build tactical alliance and coalition with Moro political groups and create domestic and global networks with agencies, foreign democratic institutions, or peoples in the advancement of its goals.

== Bangsamoro Democratic Struggle ==
Asserting the Democratic rights as a people. Sources from Philippine media indicated Maradeka stepped forward as voice of civil liberty expression in various Muslim concerns and issues such human rights violations committed against innocent civilians, graft and corruption and electoral frauds in the Philippine political system, and the right to self-determination of the Bangsamoro people. Maradeka subscribed to the assertion by prominent Moro leader Abhoud Syed Lingga of Moro people right or any peoples everywhere in the world to freely determine their political status. The Moro people as distinct people deserved to attain self-determination and for this right to be fully effective, the realization of the political, economic, social and cultural sovereignty of this indigenous people in Mindanao ought to be recognized and respected by the international community and Philippines.

Push for Mindanao Peace process. Maradeka push for resumption of peace negotiations between Philippines and Moro Islamic Liberation Front (MILF) which was impeded caused by the diplomatic impasse over the disagreement on the choice of third country facilitator and the facilitation process. See the article: Muslims want government to break impasse. In another tussles in Mindanao peace process, Mindanao peace advocates, on the other hand, had decried the public quibbling over the proposed Bangsamoro substate as counter-productive at this crucial stage of the peace negotiations. Maradeka secretary general Nash Pangadapun also cautioned the public against such premature comments pending the government's submission of its counter-proposal, and called for sobriety. In a very recent development, Maradeka lauded the pronouncement of Secretary Teresita Quintos Deles for the formal signing of peace pact by the Philippine government with the largest Moro rebel front, Moro Islamic Liberation Front (MILF) on March 27, 2014, adding, “After 17 long years of arduous negotiations, we are finally arriving at a political settlement that will seal enduring peace and progress in Mindanao,” Presidential Adviser on the Peace Process Teresita Quintos Deles said Friday. “The signing of the CAB is expected to benefit not only the Bangsamoro but the entire country, and will radiate beyond our borders to the regional community, and perhaps the whole world.” In a step up for massive information drive thru government controlled Television Network, Maradeka Secretary General Nash Pangadapun urged the spoilers who are out to obstruct the peace deal from coming to fruition to back off and called on the enemies of peace to have "change of heart" as this historic signing to be attended by mediating countries and international communities hoped to end violence against women and children.

Advocating Human Rights, Civil Liberties and Anti Discrimination. During International Human Rights Day celebration on Dec. 10, 2010 marked the 62nd anniversary of Universal Declaration of Human Rights. Maradeka and the Mindanao Peace Observers launched the March for Peace and Human Rights with the demand of the Mindanao civil society groups for fighting cultural minority rights, Mindanao peace and the release of one senior MILF official Edward Mohandis Guerra and 25 more Moro political detainees arrested by Philippine intelligence operatives. Guerra a Moro leader was arrested on September 22, 2010, in Davao City in time for his departure in a local airport for his attendance to the Geneva's United Nations' Human Rights Council Meeting. In continuing its human rights advocacy, it denounced the attack in North Cotabato and accused the military of perpetrating the bombing and then pinning the blame on the MILF. Maradeka fought against extrajudicial killings, raised voice condemning the attack of Muslim mosque killing four (4) faithfuls because it was timed with the congregational prayer time of Muslims in the local mosque, local terrorism sponsored by political clan and perpetrated by combined politicos and Philippine military.

Promoting Inter-faith Dialogue and Rejecting Extremism. In the aftermath of 9/11, Maradeka saw the widespread discrimination against Muslims and Islam. Extremists and terrorists became synonymous with Islam and any bearded men or people wearing turbans, hijabs or white skullcaps were subject to insults and attacks. Abu Sayyaf Group in the Philippines came to hijack Islam and the future of Muslims. Maradeka led Moro groups in protesting these discriminatory acts including underhanded treatment of Muslims, human rights abuse, Philippine Anti-terrorism law targeted only Muslims and push for National ID system indiscriminately wanted implementation only on Muslims. However, it discourages adverse reactions of Muslims against other religions and enjoined moderation, mutual understanding and respect.

Advance Democratic and Political Reforms. Maradeka described Philippines as a fragile "democratic" state. It had entirely copied the United States of America political system since 1935 Philippine Constitution but it is a failing state because genuine democracy do not exist to run the course of Philippine government but only catered to Hispanic Filipino elites and oligarchy. Muslims continue to protest the annexation of Mindanao, democratic Muslim representation; Moro revolutionary leaders lodge its complain over derogation of the 1996 Jakarta Final Peace Accord and the over 10 years of Philippine gov't and MILF peace negotiations; Muslim civil society groups slammed Philippine court for preventing reforms in the Autonomous Region in Muslim Mindanao (ARMM); Now, Muslim leaders seek Constitutional Reforms to pave the way for "win win" formula to resolve Mindanao problem through a shift to federal form of government in Philippines.

== Supports Freedom and Democracy Movements ==
Maradeka lend support to the causes for national liberation movements throughout the world recognizing peoples' their right to self-determination. It is asserting indigenous peoples their full freedom as a birthright and redemption of their national identity and human dignity. Maradeka launched in 2001 the Philippine Committee for Solidarity to Palestine (PHISOP) and take the lead role in Philippine protests against Israel atrocities and illegal annexation of Palestinian homeland. Maradeka expressed support also for the Khasmiris in the Indian-Pakistan dispute, protested the Pres. George Bush and US government for its baseless accusation of Iraq's Weapons of Mass Destruction (WMD)and war of aggression against the Iraqi people, and supported the Kurdish people's restless liberation struggle from Turkey and Iraq.

Maradeka established links with Muslim democratic agencies and Islamic activists, namely the Center for Islam and Democracy and the Jamaat e Islami in furtherance of its International solidarity action for peace and Islamic democracy.

== Support Peace in Mindanao ==
Maradeka supports peace gabs with Moro leaders and Philippine Pres. Aquino III out of the box solution of Mindanao conflict and conclusion of peace between Moro Islamic Liberation Front and Philippine government with the forging of Framework Agreement on the Bangsamoro on October 15, 2012, as a breakthrough in providing roadmap to finally decades of armed hostilities in Mindanao. Though, Maradeka is not completely giving up on the liberation struggle but it sees the opportunities of giving peace the chance and consolidating people under a Bangsamoro government. It called all Moro factions particularly MNLF's leader Nur Misuari to cooperate and heed the call of the Moro youth and work out a political mechanism to end factionalism through the political system offered under the Bangsamoro democratic government.

As the Philippine government and Moro Islamic Liberation Front gone through their peace panels hurdling the four (4) annexes to complete the Framework Agreement on the Bangsamoro (FAB) and draft the Compreehensive Agreement of the Bangsamoro (CAB), the installation of the Bangsamoro Transition Commission (BTC) was shaping up the Bangsamoro Basic Law which will govern the self-governing entity called Bangsamoro Ministerial Government through sessions with experts with the aid of United Nations and World Bank(Fastrac) and broad public consultations in all areas covered under the agreed upon Bangsamoro territories. In this light, Maradeka re-echoed the call of the traditional political leaders not to abandon traditional political system of Mindanao but the inclusion of the homegrown Sultanates of four known territorial Sultanates, such as the Sultanates of Maguindanao, Sulu, Buayan, and Pangampong (Federated) of Ranaw. into the political structure to be created for the new Bangsamoro political entity, whose Basic Law is set to be tackled soon by Philippine government and Moro Islamic Liberation Front (MILF) representatives and passed on for legislation at the Philippine Congress by the end of 2014.
