= Narciso Clavería =

Narciso Clavería may refer to:

- Narciso Clavería y Zaldúa (1795–1851), Governor-General of the Philippines
- Narciso Clavería y de Palacios (1869–1935), Spanish architect
