= Milagrosa =

Milagrosa may refer to:

== Places ==
- a baranggay in Calamba, Laguna
- a baranggay in Carmona, Cavite
- a baranggay in Quezon City

== Buildings and structures ==
- Church of La Milagrosa, a Roman Catholic church in Spain
- Puente La Milagrosa, a bridge in Puerto Rico
