= Toledo station =

Toledo station may refer to:

- Martin Luther King Jr. Plaza (Toledo), the main passenger rail station of Toledo, Ohio
- Toledo railway station, Spain
- Toledo (Naples Metro), Italy
