= Balangingi =

Balangingi may refer to:

- Balanguingui Island, Sulu Archipelago, Philippines
- Banguingui people, an ethnolinguistic group native to Balanguingui Island
- Balangingi language, their Austronesian language
