= Spanish expedition to Balanguingui =

1848 amphibious campaign

Balanguingui Expedition
- Part of piracy in Asia
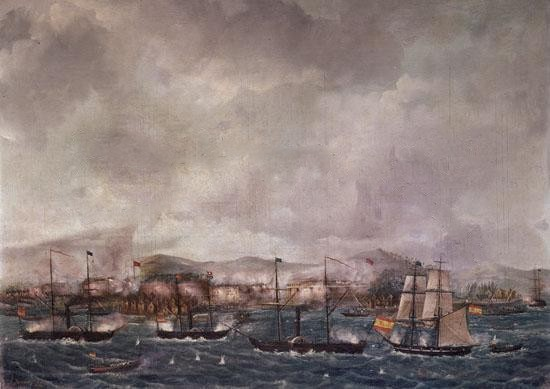
- Naval bombardment of Balanguingui, by Fernández Muñoz
Date	16–22 February 1848
Location	Balanguingui Island, the Philippines
Result	Spanish victory

Belligerents
(Spain) Captaincy General of the Philippines	Moro Pirates

Commanders and leaders
Narciso Clavería y Zaldúa	Unknown

Strength
19 warships	Land: ~1,000 pirates 124 artillery pieces 4 forts Sea: ~150 proas

Casualties and losses
229–237 killed or wounded	~450 killed 6 captured ~150 proas sunk 124 artillery pieces captured

The Balanguingui expedition of 1848 was an amphibious campaign organized by Governor General Narciso Clavería y Zaldúa to capture Balanguingui Island in the Sulu Archipelago from the Moro Pirates, who were using it as a base for their piratical activities.

The expedition, composed of 19 warships of various sizes under José Ruiz de Apodaca, set sail from Manila, was joined by additional forces at Daitan and Zamboanga, and arrived at Balanguingui on 12 February. The island was defended by four strongholds. After a landing near one of these forts, a naval bombardment and an assault succeeded in capturing the building. The second and biggest fort, as well as a minor nearby fortification, was taken by colonial forces three days later in a bloody assault. On 21 February, the remaining fort was easily captured. The campaign ended shortly after. It was a major blow to the pirates, as the colonial forces succeeded in capturing four forts and several villages, which they burned, along with more than 150 proas that were used by the pirates. About 550 captives were also freed during the operation.

== Background ==
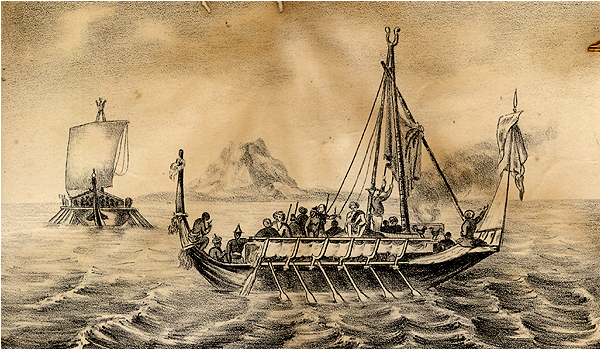
A Balanguingui garay warship, c. 1850

By the mid-19th century, the south of Mindanao and the south of the Philippines in general, were a usual haven of Muslim pirates, who devastated the coasts of the archipelago in search of booty and prisoners that they later sold in the market of Jolo. The Colonial government proposed the elimination of the pirates. To accomplish this, several expeditions were carried out against the pirate havens starting in 1843. One of the major expeditions was led by Narciso Clavería y Zaldúa, the governor-general of the Spanish colony, in early 1848. He organized a fleet of 19 warships at Manila under Brigadier José Ruiz de Apodaca including 2 steamers, 2 schooners, and 3 brigs, plus several smaller vessels, including gunboats and feluccas. Three regular infantry companies under Lieutenant Colonel Arrieta were embarked on these ships on 27 January. Two other companies, a beefeater battalion, a contingent of police, an artillery detachment, and some engineers and workers were later embarked. The flagship of the fleet was the steamer Reina de Castilla. The fleet was joined by several transports at Daitan, and, on 17 February, set sail to the major pirate base of Balanguingui. The fleet was reinforced on the way by several Filipino local vessels called vintas and 150 auxiliaries of Zamboanga.

Balanguingui was a small island with an area of 6 square miles, covered with mangroves and jungle. The ground was so flat and swampy that when the tide rose, just a few sandbanks remained dry. Four forts stood over these sandbanks, surrounded by some houses built on stilts. A shallow channel divided the island in two portions, also spreading into several branches which penetrated inside the ground, making Balanguingui a swampy maze. The forts were known by the names of Sipac, Balanguingui, Sungap and Bocutingol. The first two were the biggest, and were located at the tip of the largest estuary. Their walls were built with tree trunks ranging from 2 to 3 feet in diameter and from 18 to 20 in height, and were reinforced by fences and stone embankments.

== Expedition ==
=== Capture of Fort Balanguingui ===
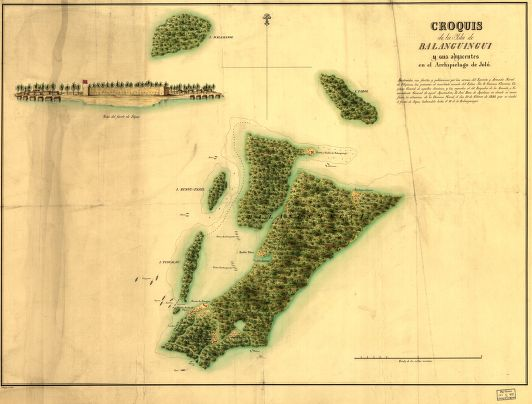
Map of Balanguingui island, 1848.

At dawn on 16 February, taking advantage of the low tide, which had left the fort linked to the mainland, the regular infantry companies of Asia, la Reina, Segundo Ligero and Fernando VII, plus the 150 veteran Zamboangan auxiliaries, were landed. The first three were entrusted with the capture of the fort, while the second one and the auxiliaries, under Andrés Arriete, were a reserve force. Two steamers and two schooners, with support from several minor vessels, began to shell the fort. Once the bombardment had lowered the morale of the pirates, the assault was launched.

It was found that grappling hooks were needed to climb the fort's walls, but despite this and stubborn resistance by the pirates, who defended themselves with rifles, grenades, spears, and stones, the colonial forces managed to scale the walls and enter the fort. Some 25 pirates were killed inside, while another 30 or 40 dove into the water and were drowned or killed by the fire from the Spanish feluccas and armed boats. 14 artillery pieces were taken. The colonial forces' losses amounted to 5 regular soldiers and two auxiliaries killed and about 50 wounded, including two colonels, José María Pañarada and Cayetano Figuera.

=== Capture of Fort Sipac ===
The colonial forces then tried to advance inside the island through the channel, but there was not enough water for the Spanish boats. Clavería decided to assault the Fort called Sipac. He reconnoitered the fort and found that the naval forces could not approach to surround it, so he gave orders for 2 12 caliber mountain howitzers to be deployed on the isthmus. At dawn on the 19th the naval forces took their positions. They opened fire at 7:00 AM, at the same time as the land batteries. One hour later, the assault columns, which included a naval brigade and 50 grappling hooks, began the assault shouting "Viva la Reina". They were met with heavy rifle-fire from the pirates but succeeded in cutting down some wooden obstacles and entering the fort. The pirates, in their desperation, killed their families or rushed themselves against the Spanish bayonets. Many civilians were killed during the battle, and about 150 were captured by the Spaniards, who sent them to a field hospital.

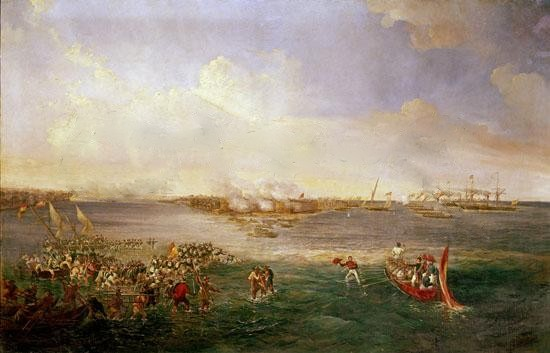
Spanish landing at Balanguingui, by Antonio Brugada.

Near the main fort, on the other side of a thick coconut grove, there was a minor fort that had inflicted some casualties during the previous engagement. Claverías entrusted its capture to Captain Gregorio Bárcenas and his carabineer company of the 2nd Light Regiment. Only one Moro was wounded in the assault, compared to no Spanish casualties. The Spaniards took 93 artillery pieces at the two forts, most of them bronze cannons. Thirteen others were found in nearby houses. The colonial forces' losses had been considerable: 16 killed, 124 wounded and 22 bruised. Captain José María Ataide, of the 1st Light Regiment, was killed, and Clavería's two adjutants were wounded along with other officers. 340 corpses of dead pirates were bunched together and burned to avoid disease.

=== End of the campaign ===
There was a last fort in the hands of the pirates at the island. The Spaniards were informed by some fugitives that the pirates were improving the fort's defenses. They also showed Clavería and his men a point from which they could approach to the fort without being seen. On 21 February, Clavería detached a company of the 1st Light Regiment under Colonel Peñarada and some Zamboangan auxiliaries from his naval forces to be landed at the signaled point with the aim of reconnoitering the area or, if possible, capturing the fort. Peñarada and his men, once disembarked, advanced through waist-deep water and managed to surprise the fort.

The pirates, lacking military experience, were caught by surprise and fled, leaving the fort and 3 artillery pieces in Spanish hands; another one was captured in a nearby house. After this, two Spanish armed boats and some Zamboangan vintas entered the island through its channels and set fire to numerous pancos (garay) and other vessels used by the pirates, 150 in number. The infantry, meanwhile, cut between 7,000 and 8,000 coconuts, set fire to the seven villages on the island and dismantled and burned the forts. Although the minor vessels of the expedition were detached during the nights to prevent the escape of the remaining pirates, some of them managed to escape to Jolo or the nearby islands. On the other hand, most of those who had sought refuge in the mangroves died of hunger and thirst.

== Aftermath ==
On 25 February, the Spanish troops were reembarked along with the wounded, the prisoners and the freed captives, and the fleet set sail to Zamboanga. After a short stop at the islands of Tonquil and Pilas to inform the natives there about the punishment inflicted to Balanguingui, the steamers arrived at Zamboanga on 28 February, followed a day later by the remaining ships. The success of the expedition was simultaneously celebrated at Zamboanga and at Manila, where news of the Spanish victory had been received. Clavería was awarded the Cross of San Fernando and was made Count of Manila and Viscount of Clavería by the Queen Isabella II of Spain.

Besides the capture of the pirate vessels and artillery, about 250 captives were freed. The Spanish casualties of the expedition numbered between 229 and 237 men, of which 22 were killed, but the success greatly contributed to reduce the activities of the Moro pirates against the Spanish possessions in the area. Since the pirates had also affected Dutch possessions in the area, the General-Governor of those possessions congratulated Clavería on 25 July 1849. Thanks to the Spanish victory trade was temporarily reactivated and the pirates of the Sulu Archipielago, having been informed of Clavería "ravaging the island of Balanguingui and putting its defenders to sword", were terrified. It was rumored, at the beginning of 1849, that the island had been reoccupied by the pirates, but after an expedition was sent to the area, no significant force was found.

== See also ==
- Slavery in the Sulu Sea
- Alipin
- Spanish–Moro conflict
- Philippine–American War
- Cross border attacks in Sabah
