= List of Bienes de Interés Cultural in the Province of Toledo =

This is a list of Bien de Interés Cultural landmarks in the Province of Toledo, Spain.

- Consuegra Dam
- Convent of la Concepción Francisca
- Convento de Santa Fé
- Museum of Santa Cruz
- Toledo railway station
