= Museum of Santa Cruz =

- Museo de Santa Cruz
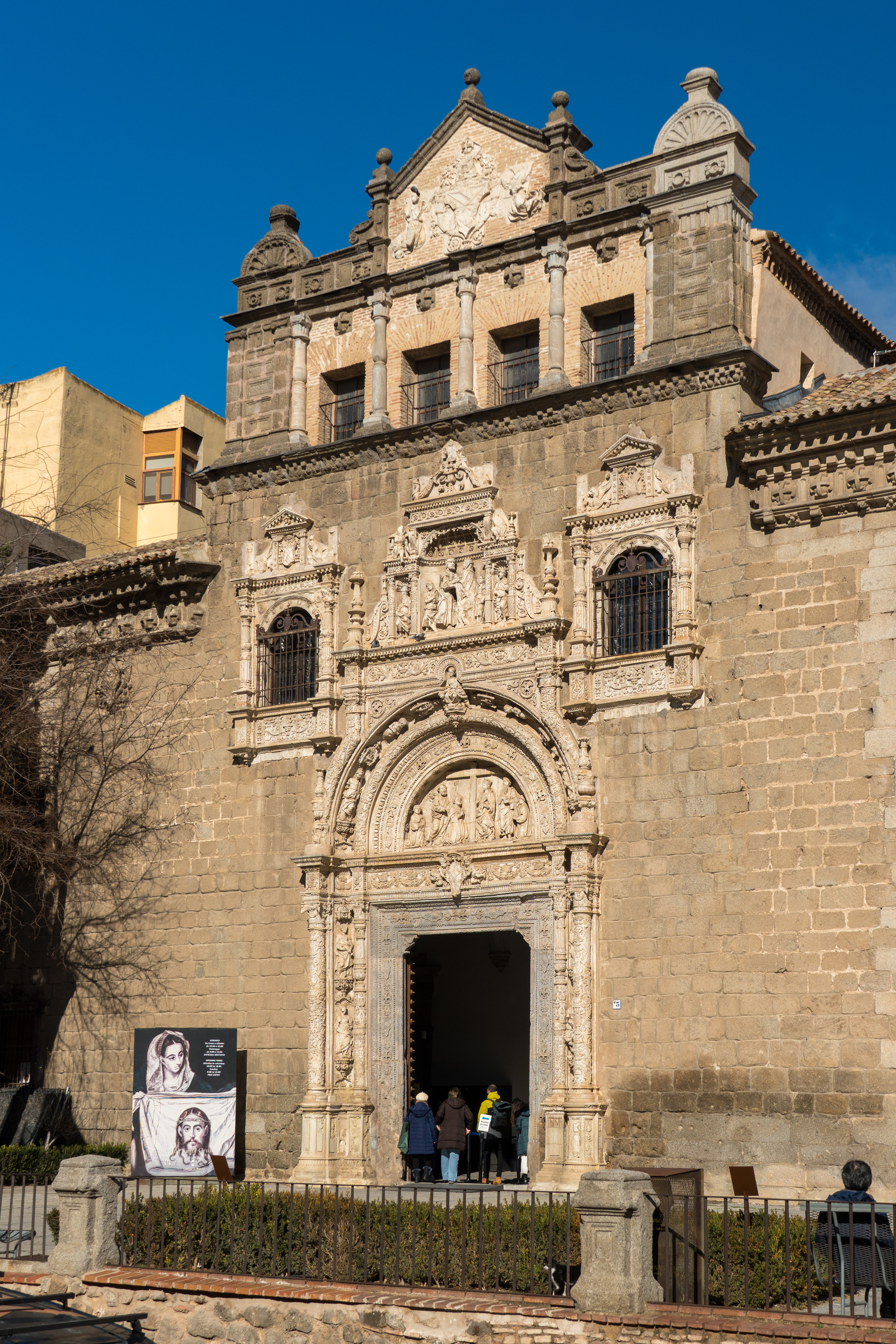
- The plateresque façade
- Interactive fullscreen map
- Established: 1844
- Location: Toledo, Spain
- Coordinates: 39.86013°N 4.02057°W
- Type: Archeology, art, ethnographic
- Owner: General State Administration

Spanish Cultural Heritage
- Official name: Hospital de Santa Cruz
- Type: Non-movable
- Criteria: Monument
- Designated: 1902
- Reference no.: RI-51-0000082

The Museum of Santa Cruz (Spanish: Museo de Santa Cruz) is an art, archaeology and ethnographic museum located in the historic centre of the city of Toledo, Spain. It exhibits collections pertaining to the province of Toledo, including works painted by El Greco in the city of Toledo.

The museum is housed in an architecturally significant 16th-century building, the Hospital de Santa Cruz, which has been protected by a heritage designation, currently Bien de Interés Cultural, since 1902.

It is owned by the Spanish State and operated by the regional administration, the Junta de Comunidades de Castilla-La Mancha.

== History ==
The museum was created by the Provincial Commission of Artistic Monuments in 1844, with an initial collection consisting of items obtained from the desamortizaciónes as well as from the personal archaeological collection of the Cardinal Lorenzana.

In 1919, the provincial museum of archaeology was moved to is current location at Santa Cruz Hospital, a standout example of civilian renaissance architecture in Spain. A fine arts section was created in 1961, and the museum was then renamed as Museo de Santa Cruz.

The management (not the ownership) of the museum was transferred from the Spanish State to the regional administration of Castile-La Mancha in 1984.

== Collections ==
The museum has sections devoted to archeology, fine arts and decorative arts. The fine arts collection is distributed on the first and second floor of the building, and archaeology is in the Noble Cloister and in an underground floor. The decorative arts have a sample of Toledan folk handicrafts, which is also located on the floor of the basement.

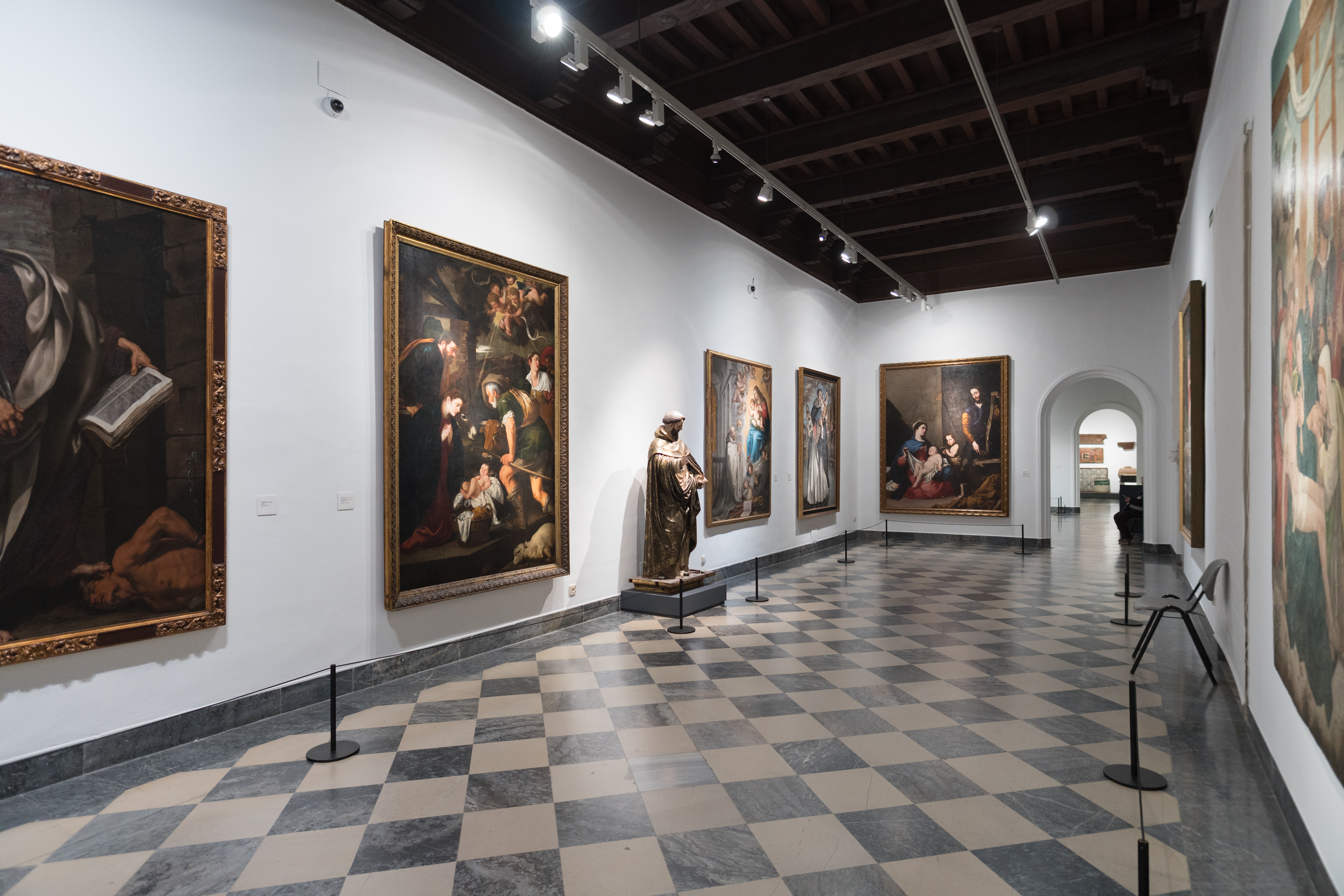
Overview

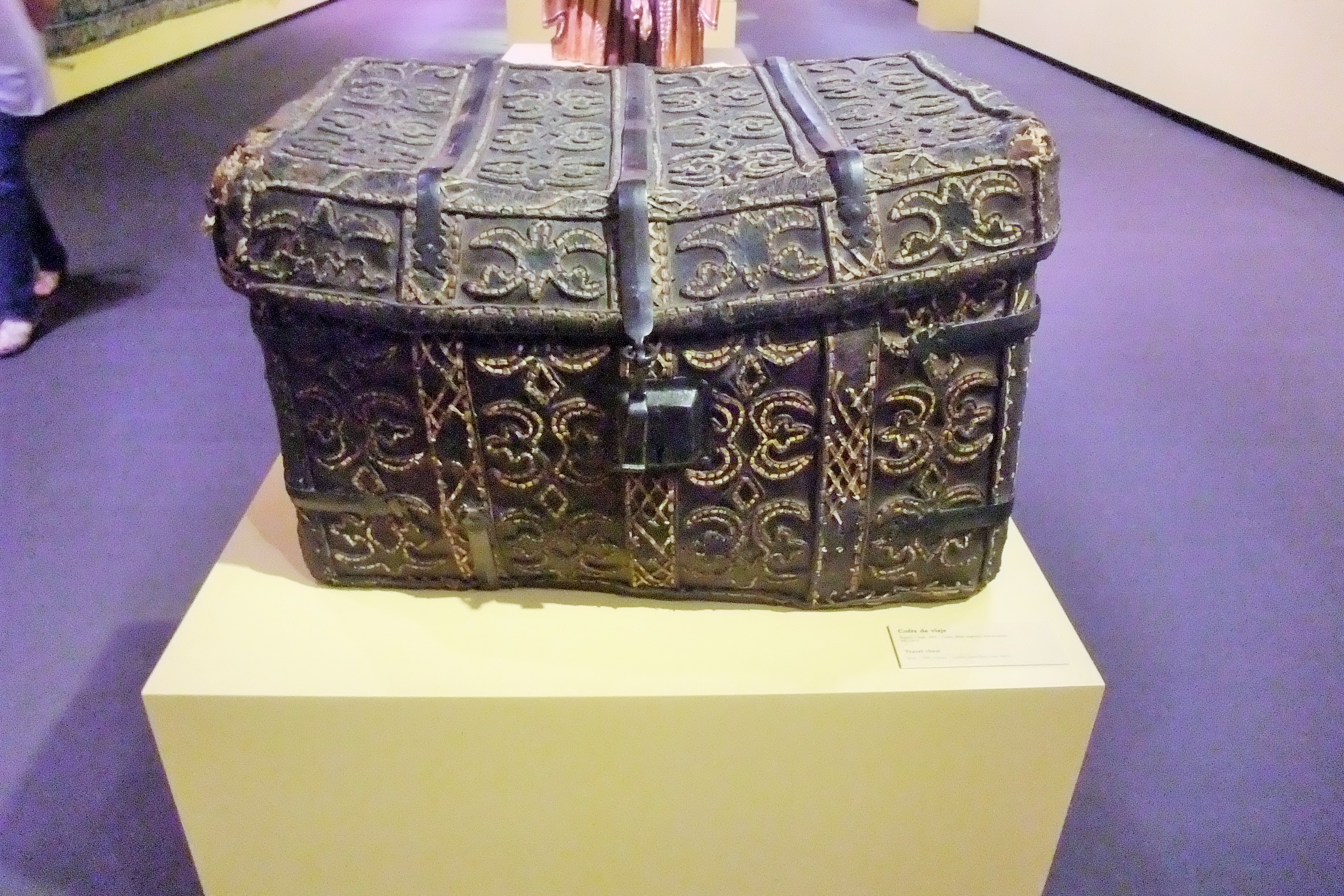
Travel chest (16th century)

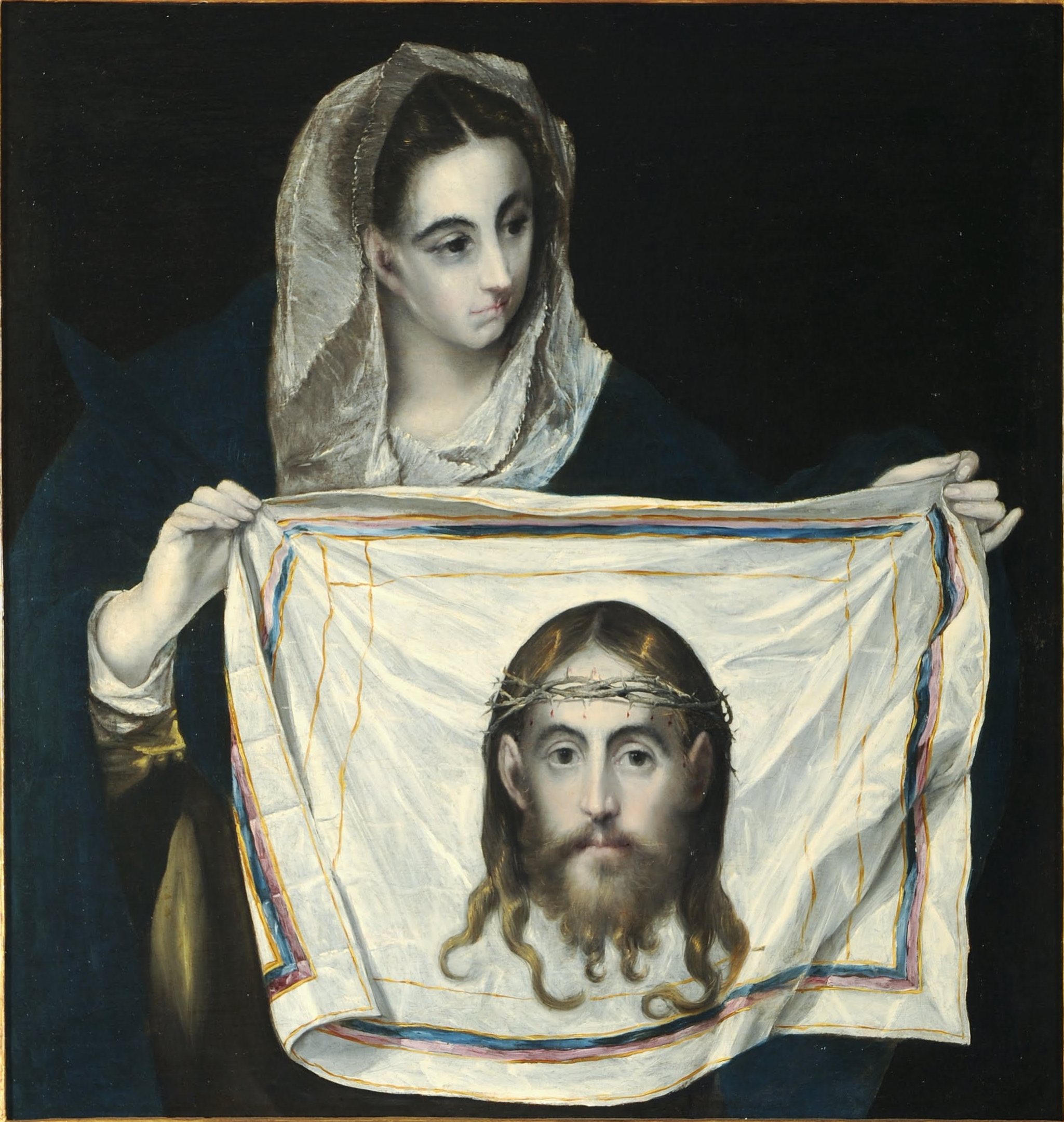
El Greco's La Verónica.
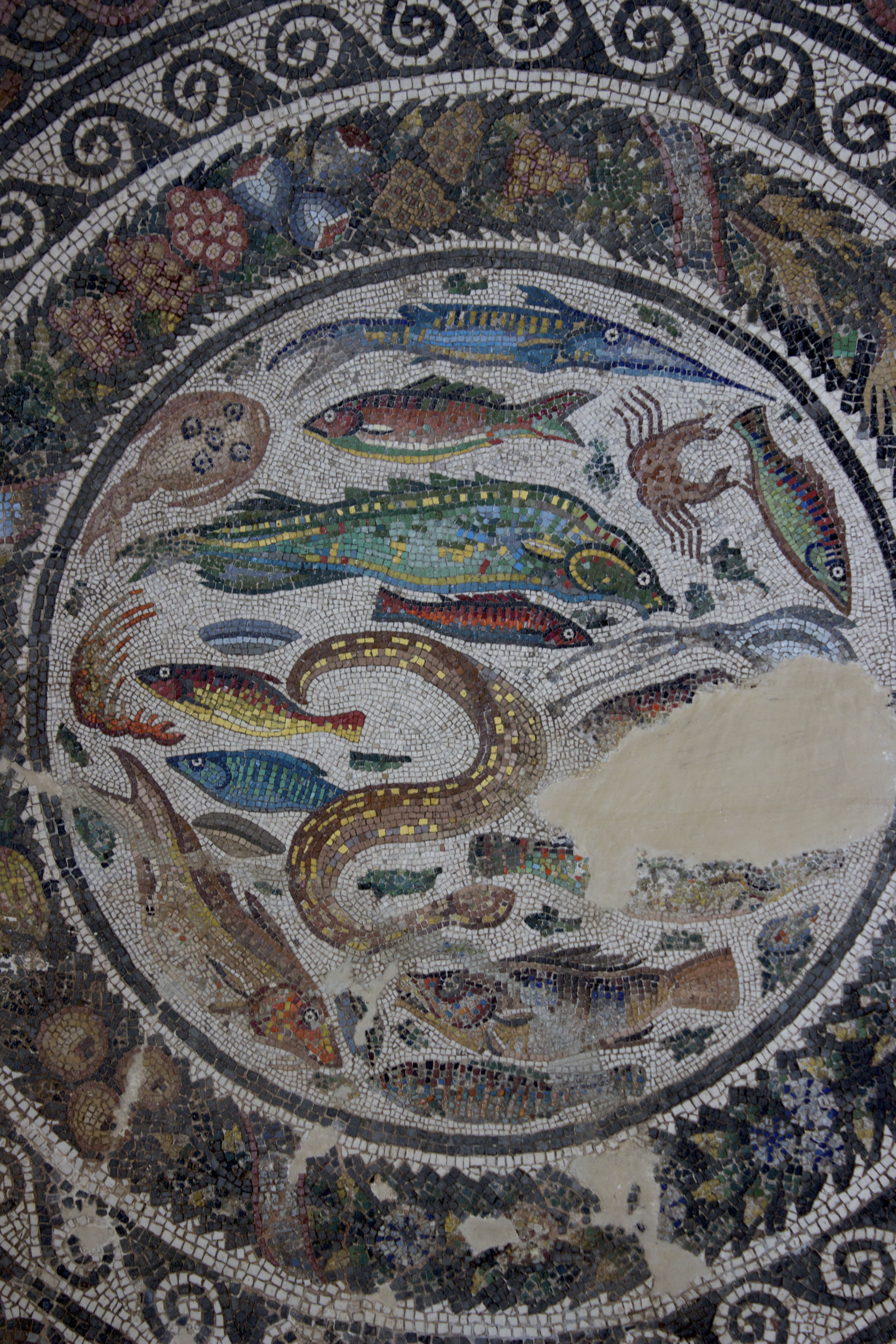
Roman mosaic

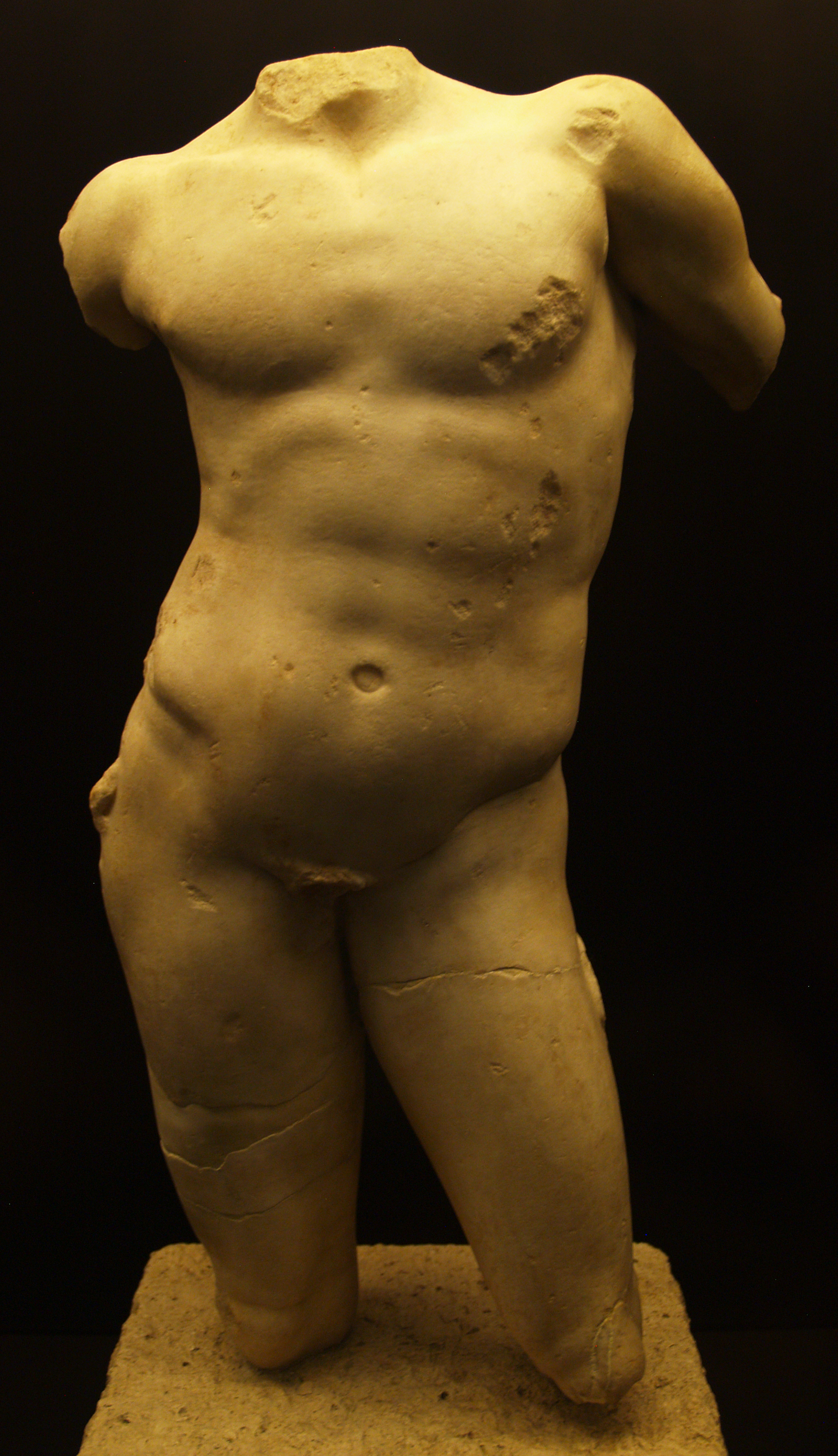
Roman torso

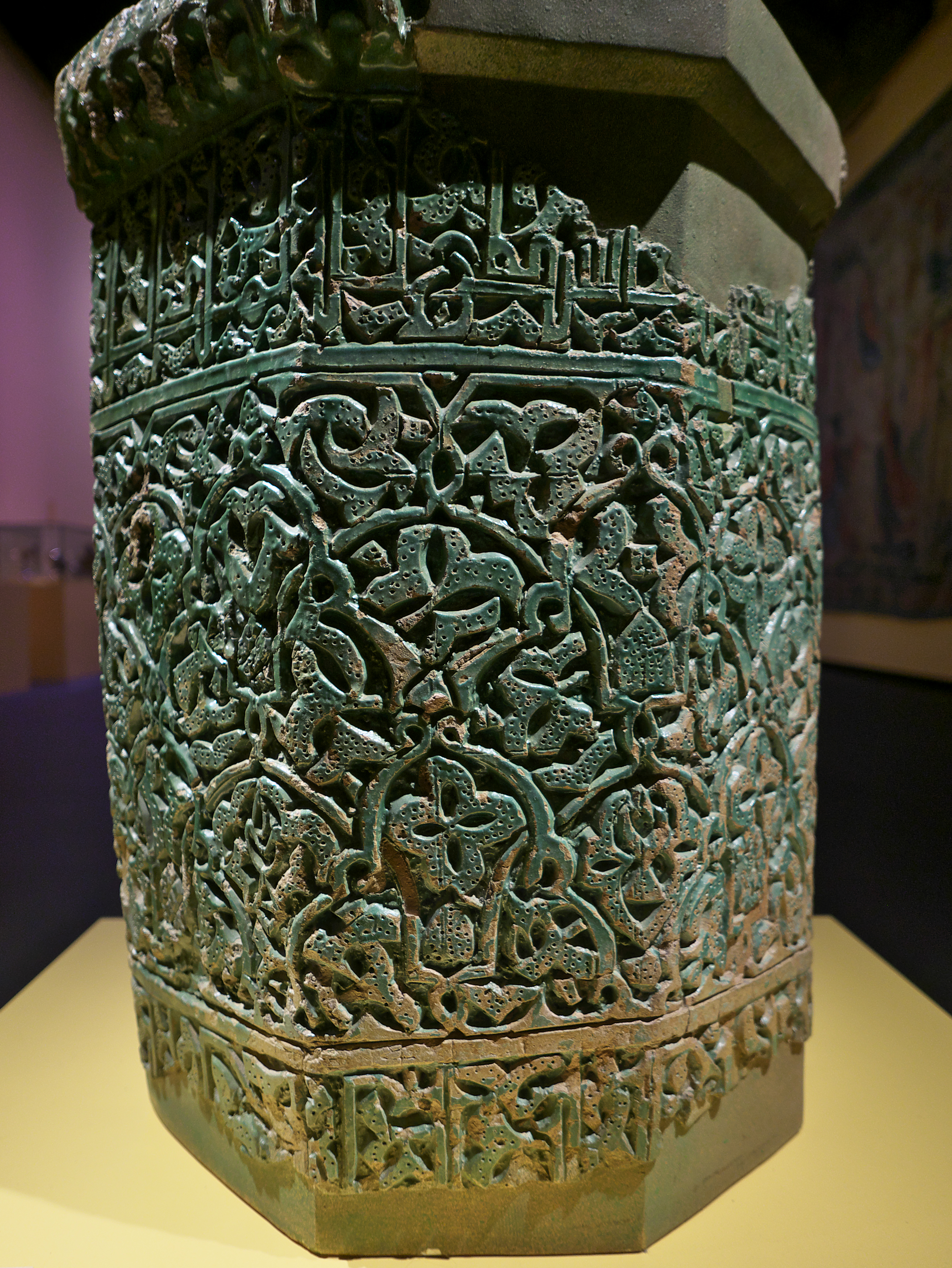
Decorated well parapet (14th century)

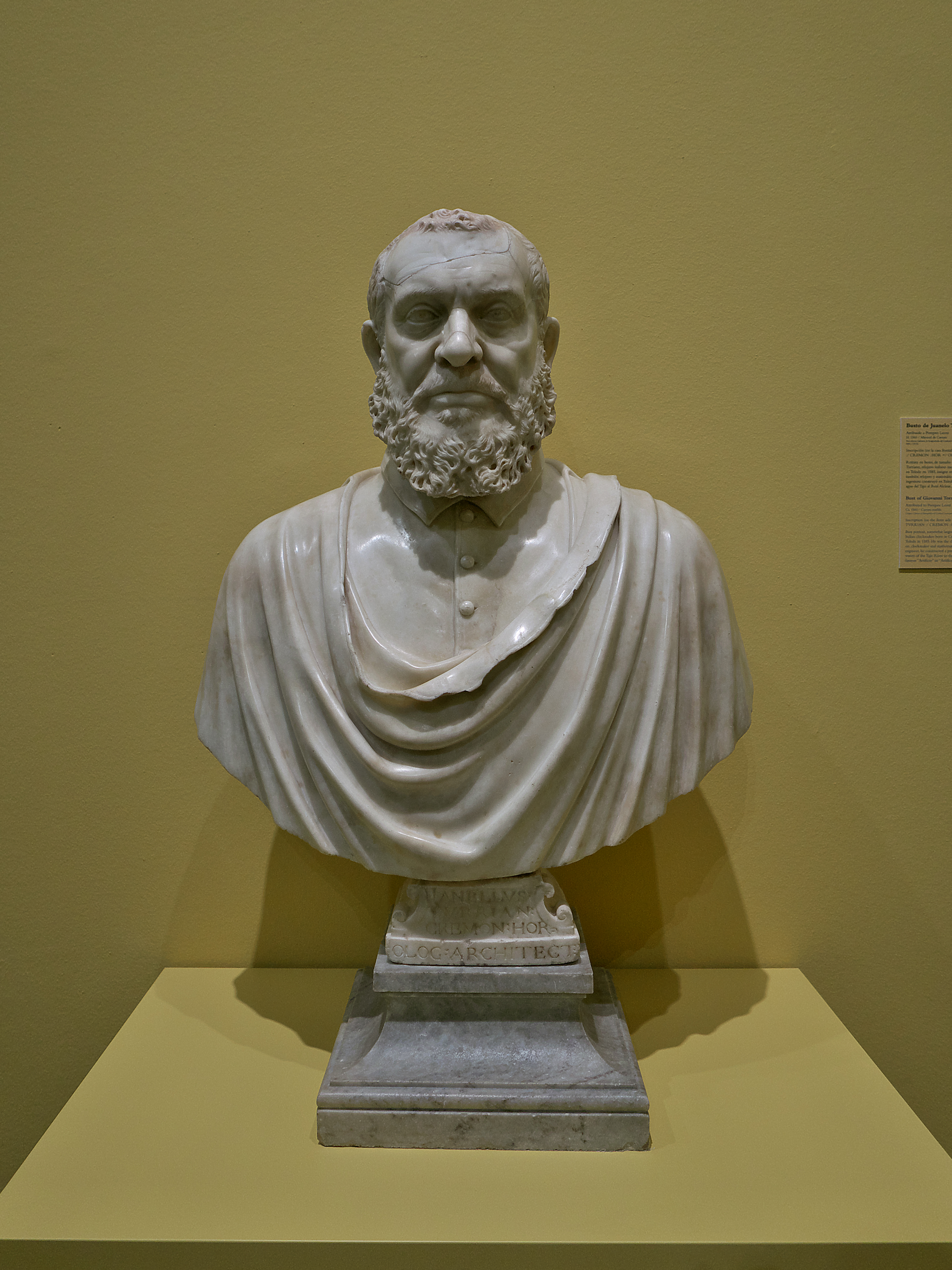
Bust of Juanelo Turriano, attributed to Pompeo Leoni

== Building ==
The hospital was founded by Pedro González de Mendoza, archbishop of Toledo 1482-1495 and a cardinal, in order to centralize assistance to orphaned and abandoned children in the city. It has a remarkable Plateresque portal, the work of Alonso de Covarrubias. The building has a Greek cross plan and four courtyards, two of which were fully completed. The first is by Covarrubias and gives access to the upper floor through a three-ladder staircase.

A crossing covers the museum's two main floors and is covered with ribbed vaults. In the north arm was located the chapel.

It was conceived as a stand-alone building with six galleries that would intersect forming courtyards. It remains unfinished (two of the courtyards were never made). The altar is located in the center and the courtyards are devised seven of which are made four and of those four, only one was finalized by Alonso de Covarrubias.

There are four galleries, which connect with the courtyards, on two floors made by Enrique Egas and in the center is the table with the altar. The basket arches are on pillars with leaves and cherubim in the coat of arms of Mendoza.

In general there is a symbiosis of the Moorish tradition with Flemish art. Cover of pair and knuckle in framed wood of casetones. The wood has decorative and utilitarian function. The ashlars are well carved and the portal was made by Covarrubias, made it entintelada, the entablature is flanked by paired pseudocolumns with niches and doseletes; the shafts having Grotesque decoration.

The pediment is round classic that houses the discovery of the Lignum crucis by Saint Helen. It supports the entablature with another body. An archivolt was broken to place a niche representing charity. At the top are the Virgin's wedding dresses with dolphins.

The windows are symmetrical with bulbous order and edicts with the emblem of Mendoza. The last body, later, is mannerist.

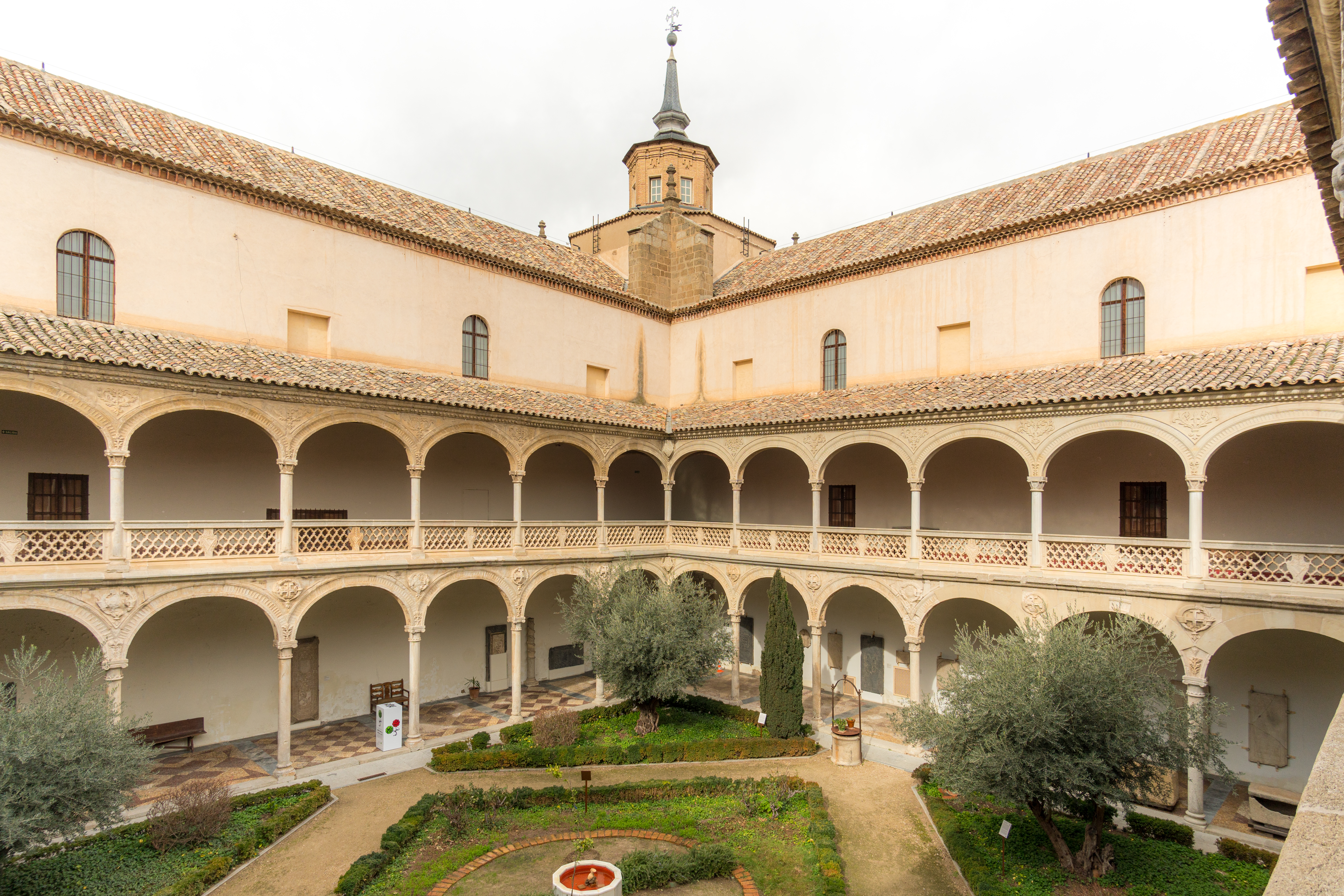

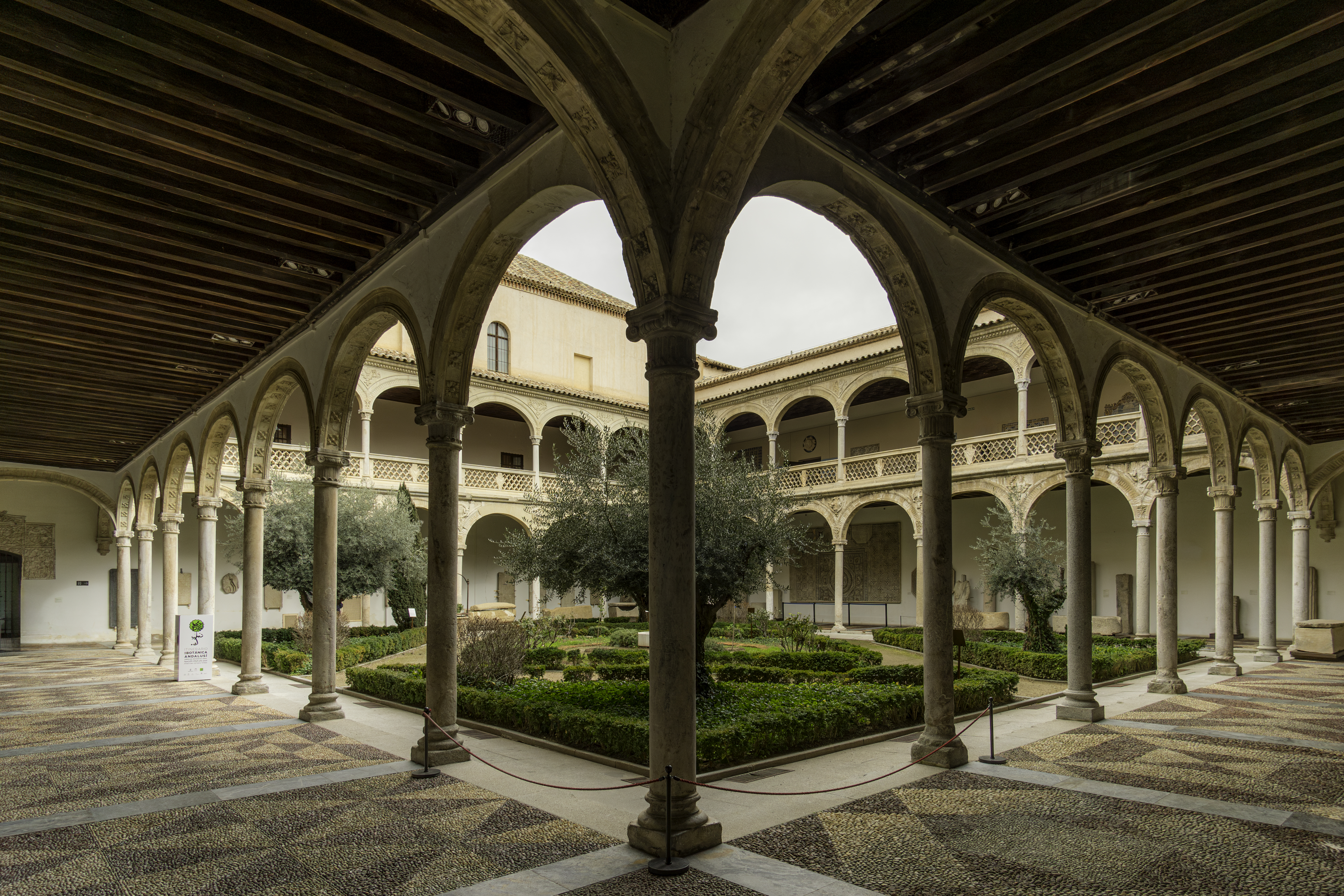

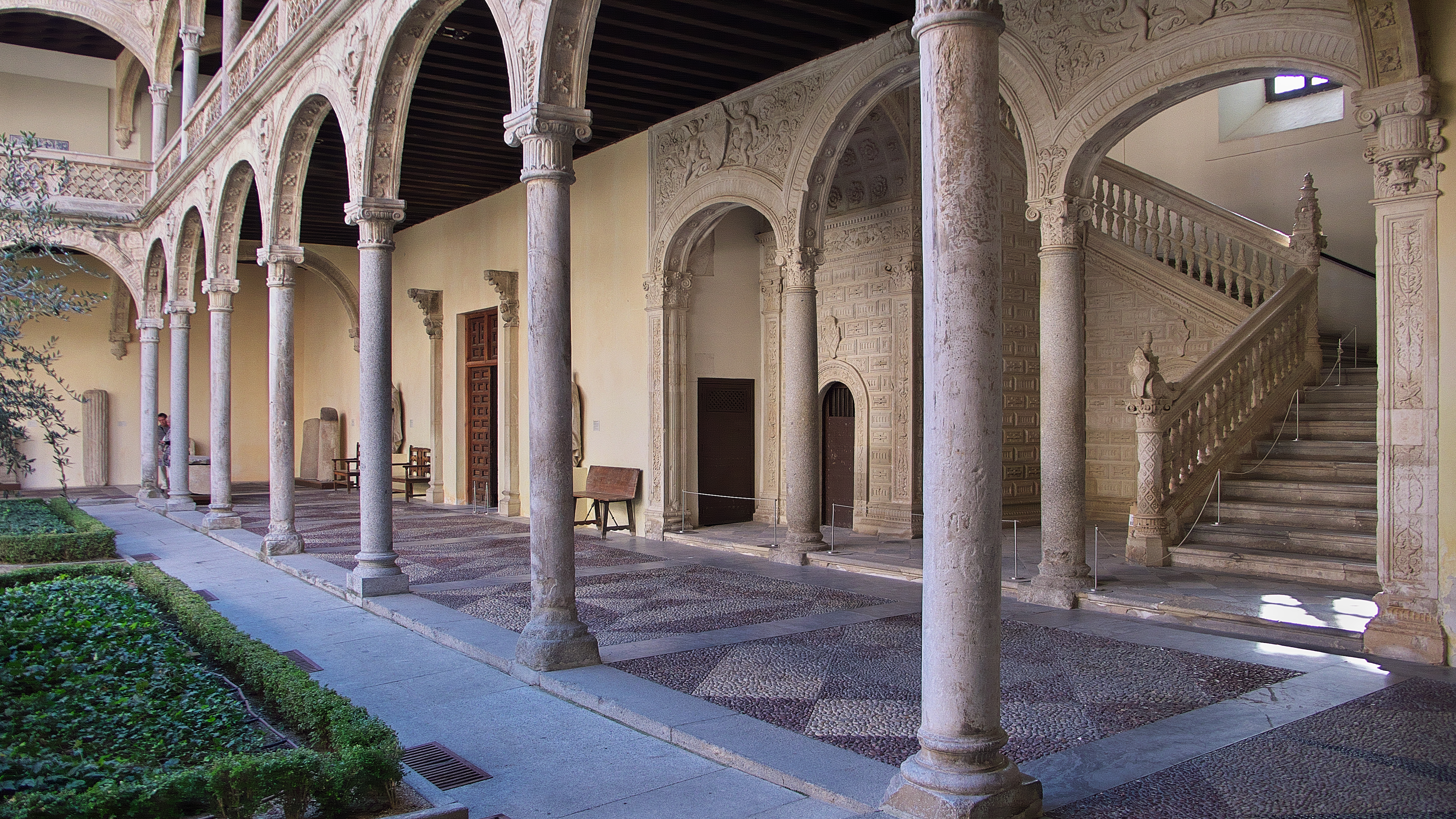

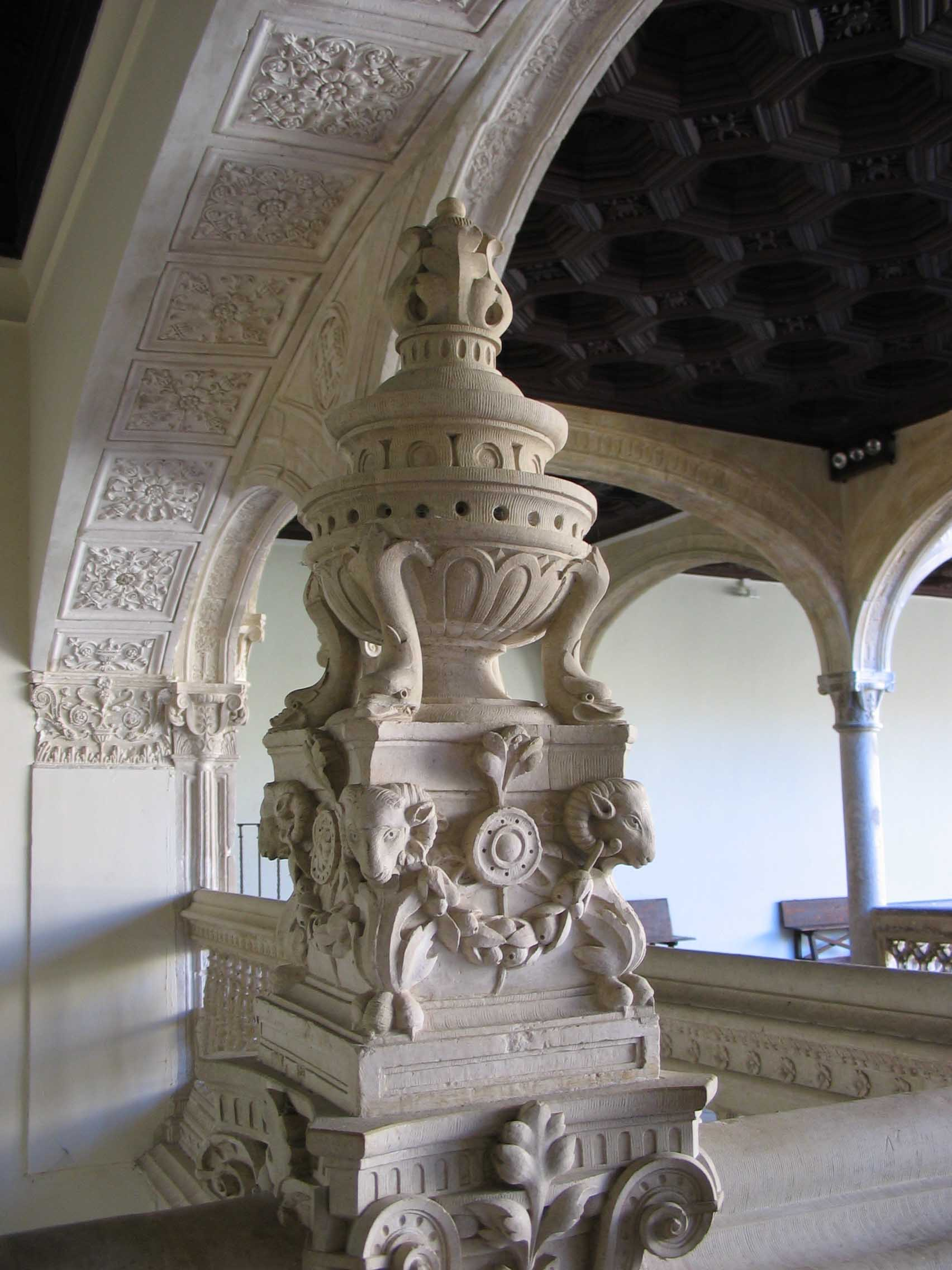
Staircase

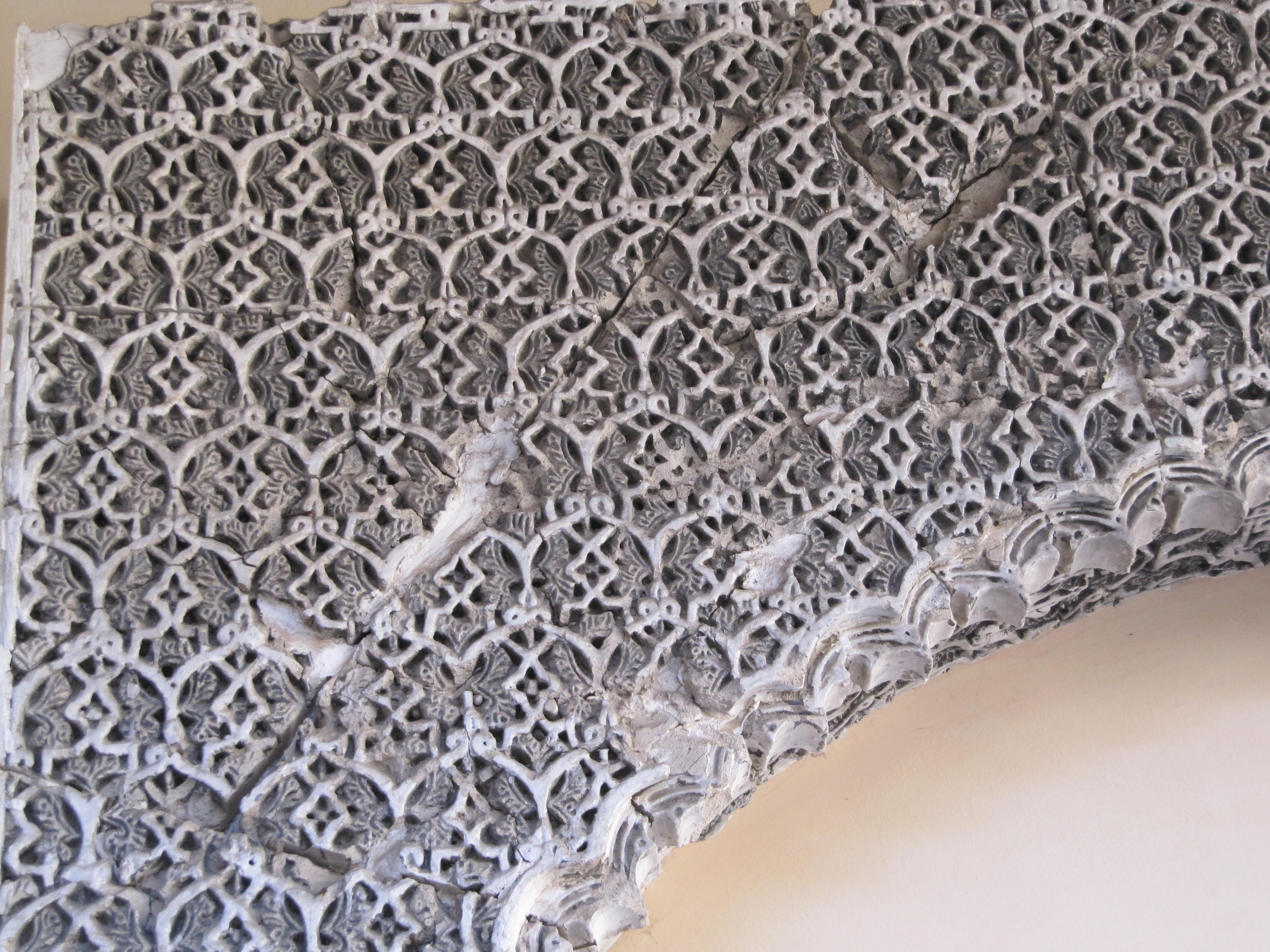
Courtyard detail

== See also ==
- List of Bienes de Interés Cultural in the Province of Toledo
- 16th-century Western domes

== Notes and references ==
- This contains information taken from the homonymous article in the Spanish Wikipedia.

Citations

Bibliography

- Caballero Klink, Alfonso; Gómez García, Laura María (2017). "El Museo de Santa Cruz de Toledo" (PDF). Boletín del Museo Arqueológico Nacional. 35. Madrid: Museo Arqueológico Nacional: 947–964. ISSN 2341-3409.
