= Church of La Milagrosa =

Church of La Milagrosa (Our Lady of Miracles)
- Iglesia de la Milagrosa
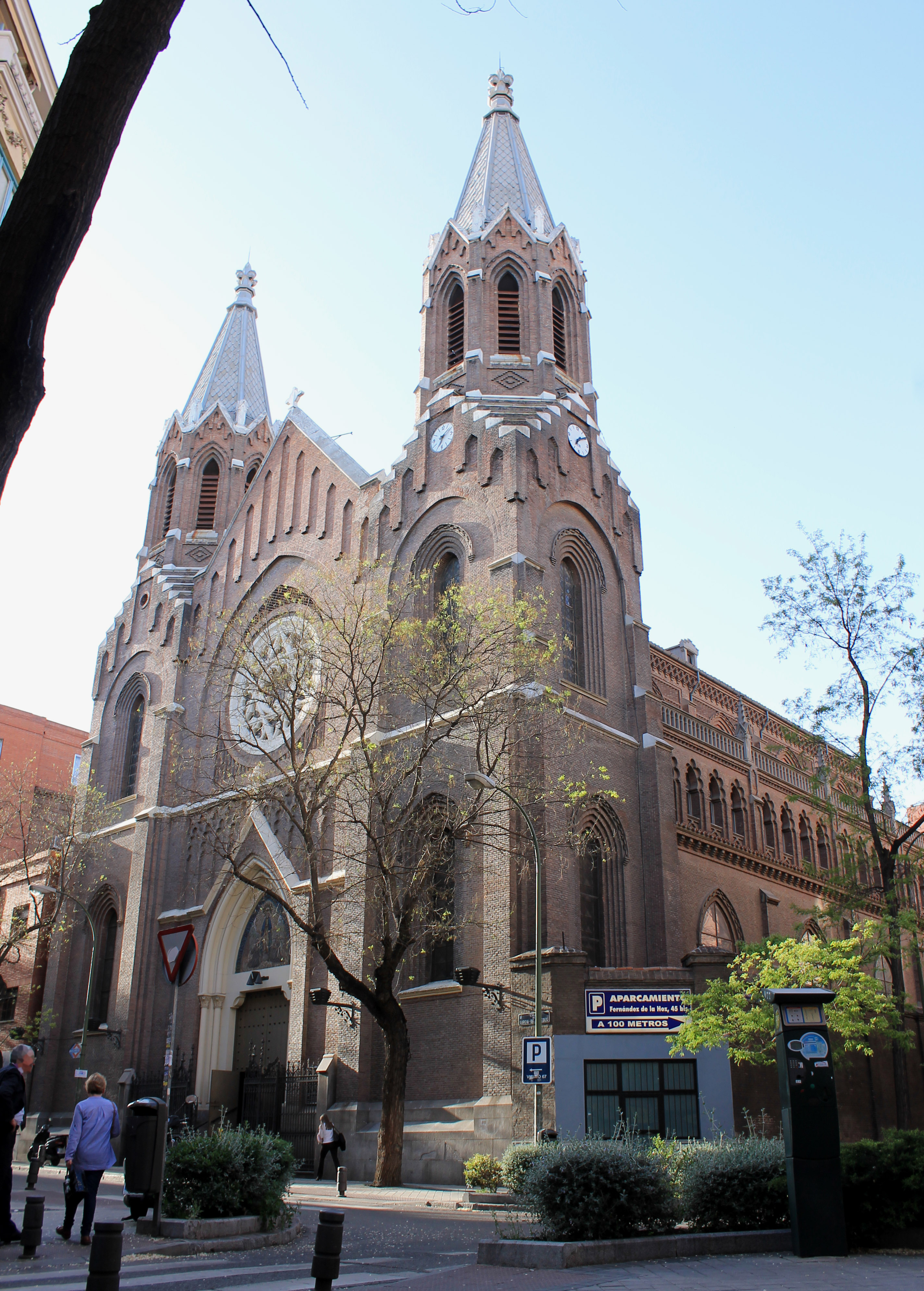
- Interactive map of the Church of La Milagrosa (Our Lady of Miracles) area
- Alternative names: Iglesia de San Vicente de Paul

General information
- Type: Church
- Architectural style: Neo-Mudéjar, Neo-Gothic
- Location: 45 Calle García de Paredes, Madrid, Spain
- Coordinates: 40°26′12.61″N 3°41′41.65″W
- Construction started: 1900
- Completed: 1904

Design and construction
- Architects: Juan Bautista Lázaro de Diego, Narciso Clavería y de Palacios

The Church of La Milagrosa, formerly Church of San Vicente de Paul, is a Roman Catholic church in Madrid, Spain. With an area of 900 square metres (9,700 sq ft), it is situated on Calle García de Paredes, west of the InterContinental Madrid. The church was built between 1900 and 1904 under the architects Juan Bautista Lázaro de Diego and Narciso Clavería y de Palacios. The architecture is eclectic, exhibiting Neo-Mudéjar features on the exterior and mainly Neo-Gothic features in the interior.

== Location ==
The church is located on García de Paredes street at the corner of Fernández de la Hoz street.

== History ==
Built between 1900 and 1904, the architects in charge of the project were Juan Bautista Lázaro de Diego, who is associated with Gothic Revival architecture, and Narciso Clavería y de Palacios, who is associated with Moorish Revival architecture.

In 1977 the Boletín Oficial del Estado included the church among a number of buildings to be protected by means of a heritage listing. The definition of the protected area around the monument appears to be ongoing. The monument's protection environment was set out in 1993, but as at 2014 its current protection status as a Bien de Interés Cultural is pending (Incoado con Delimitación).

== Architecture and fittings ==
The exterior has Neo-Mudéjar features, while the inside is predominately Neo-Gothic. The church covers 900 square metres (9,700 sq ft). The facade has two towers, one on each side, each with a square base and an octagonal steeple. In the past it had a mosaic by Daniel Zuloaga.

== See also ==
- Catholic Church in Spain
- List of oldest church buildings

== Bibliography ==
- Arquitectura y Construcción (January 1906). "Arquitectura española contemporánea: Iglesia de S. Vicente de Paul-Madrid". Arquitectura y Construcción (in Spanish) (162) (Public domain ed.). Barcelona. ISSN 1887-5351.
- García-Gutiérrez Mosteiro, Javier (1992). "La obra arquitectónica de Juan Bautista Lázaro". Boletín de la Real Academia de Bellas Artes de San Fernando (in Spanish) (74).
