= Convent of the Franciscan Conceptionists =

- Convento de la Concepción Franciscana (Spanish)
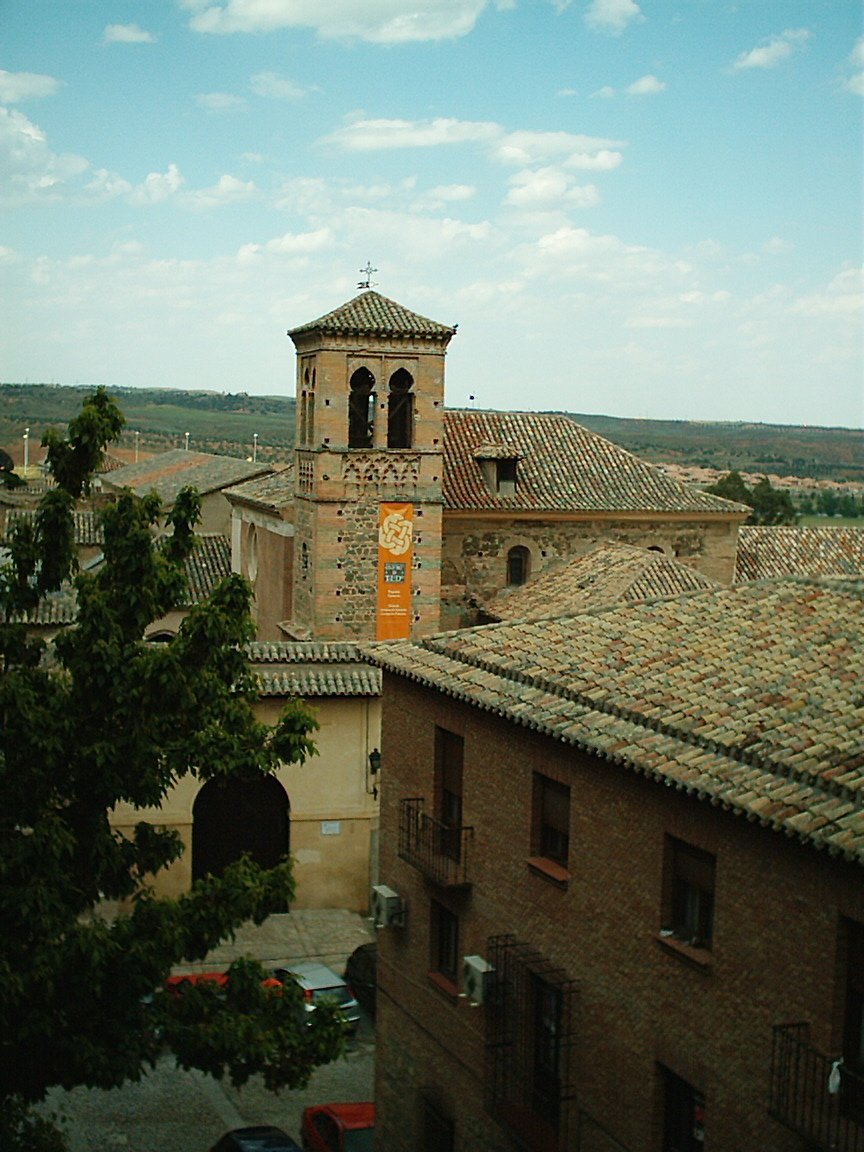

- Location within Spain
- 39.860178°N 4.019431°W
- Location: Toledo, Spain

Spanish Cultural Heritage
- Official name: Convento de la Concepción Francisca
- Type: Non-movable
- Criteria: Monument
- Designated: 1884
- Reference no.: RI-51-0000040

The Convent of the Franciscan Conceptionists (Spanish: Convento de la Concepción Franciscana) is a Catholic convent of the Order of the Immaculate Conception, founded in 1484 by Saint Beatrice of Silva and located in Toledo, Spain. It is protected by the heritage listing Bien de Interés Cultural. The Chapel of Saint Jerome, which forms part of the complex, was first protected in 1884.

== See also ==
- List of Bien de Interés Cultural in the Province of Toledo
