= Juan Bautista Lázaro de Diego =

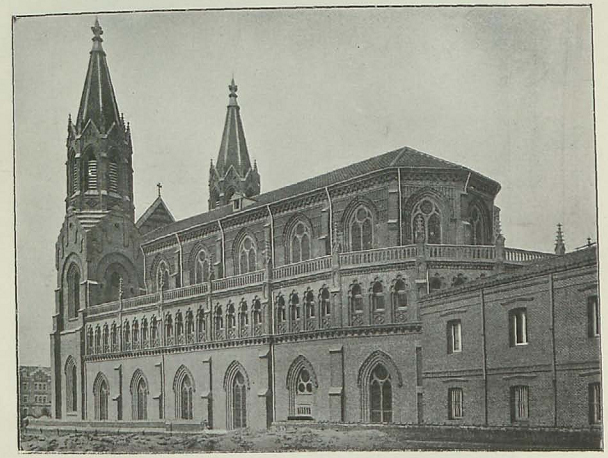
- Church of La Milagrosa or Church of San Vicente de Paul, built between 1900 and 1904, a work by Juan Bautista Lázaro.
- Born: 1849; León, Spain
- Died: 1919; Ciempozuelos, Spain
- Occupation: architect
- Spouse: Águeda de Mora Becerra

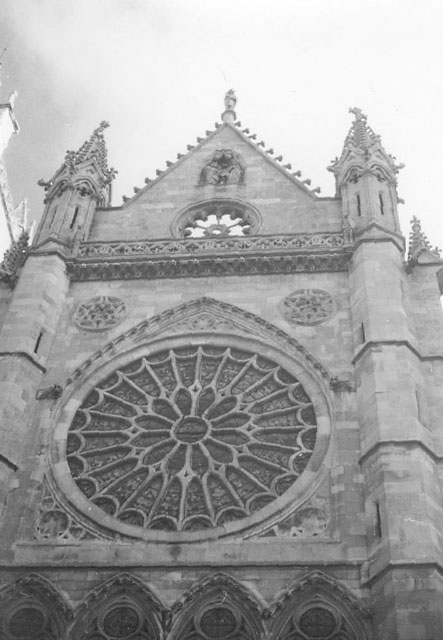
León Cathedral

Juan Bautista Lázaro de Diego (León, 1849 - Ciempozuelos, 1919) was a Spanish architect, born to jurist José Benito Lázaro and astorgana María de Diego Pinillos. He was a disciple of Juan de Madrazo, a gothic revivalist in charge of León Cathedral's restoration, a project in which Lázaro de Diego took part, specializing in stained glass workmanship. He received a gold medal in the National Exhibition of Fine Arts of 1897 and the Great Cross of Isabella the Catholic in 1901.

From 1875 to 1879 he worked as town-architect in Ávila. He developed a remarkable activity in the restoration of architectural heritage in the late nineteenth century. One of his biggest contributions was the introduction of Catalan vault system in Madrid, after travelling to Barcelona in 1888. He had a stained glass workshop in Ayala street, Madrid, run from 1890 to 1911.

Some of his works are:

- the School of the Ursulinas,
- the Chapel of Saint Diego and Saint Nicholas asylum,
- Church of La Milagrosa,
- Church of El Pilar,
- Church of Los Redentoristas,
- Church of Las Reparadoras,
- Church of Las Hijas de la Caridad,
- Church of Cedillo, Temple of Sacred Hearts in Sabucedo de Montes, the enlargement of Ávila's cemetery or La Bañeza's cemetery.

In his last years he developed a mental illness, that led him to be interned in the psychiatric sanatorium of San José de Ciempozuelos in 1908, confinement that would last until his death in 1919.

== Bibliography ==
- García-Gutiérrez Mosteiro, Javier (1992). "La obra arquitectónica de Juan Bautista Lázaro". Boletín de la Real Academia de Bellas Artes de San Fernando (in Spanish) (74): 445–498.
- García-Gutiérrez Mosteiro, Javier (19–21 September 1996). "El sistema de bóvedas tabicadas en Madrid: de Juan Bautista Lázaro (1849-1919) a Luis Moya (1904-1990)". Actas del Primer Congreso Nacional de Historia de la Construcción (PDF) (in Spanish). coord. by Antonio de las Casas Gómez. Madrid. pp. 231–242. ISBN 84-7790-252-6. Archived from the original (PDF) on 4 September 2011.
- da Rocha Aranda, Oscar (2009). El modernismo en la arquitectura madrileña: génesis y desarrollo de una opción ecléctica (in Spanish). CSIC Press. ISBN 9788400088897.
