= Narciso Clavería y Zaldúa =

Spanish Governor-General of the Philippines from 1844 to 1849

Lieutenant General The Most Excellent The Count of Manila Count of Manila
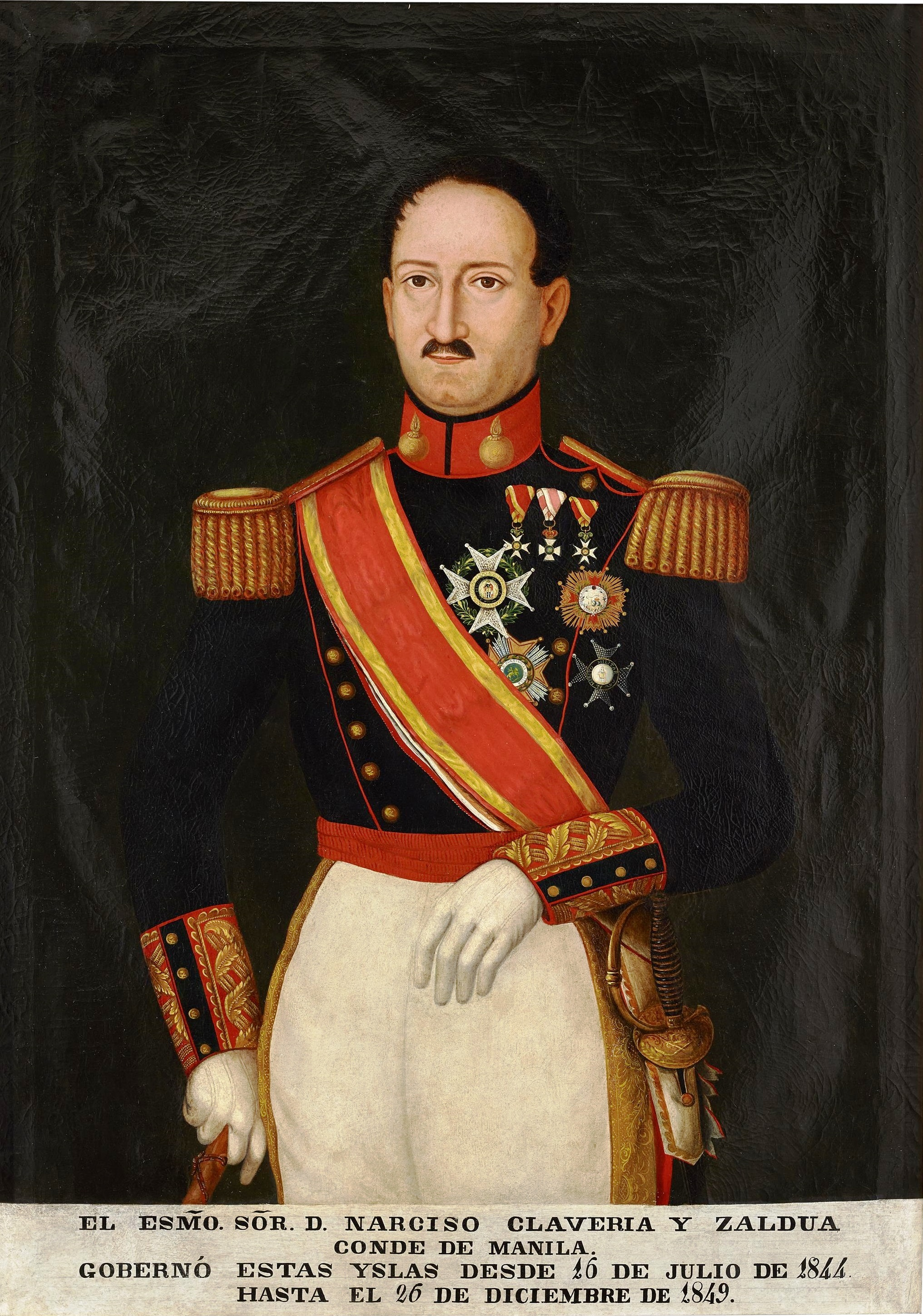

71st Governor-General of the Philippines
- In office July 16, 1844 – December 26, 1849
- Monarch: Isabella II of Spain
- Preceded by: Francisco de Paula Alcalá de la Torre
- Succeeded by: Antonio María Blanco

Personal details
- Born: Narciso José Anastasio Clavería y Zaldúa; May 2, 1795 Girona, Catalonia, Spain
- Died: June 20, 1851 (aged 56) Madrid, Spain
- Spouse(s): Ana Berroeta Clavería, Countess of Manila

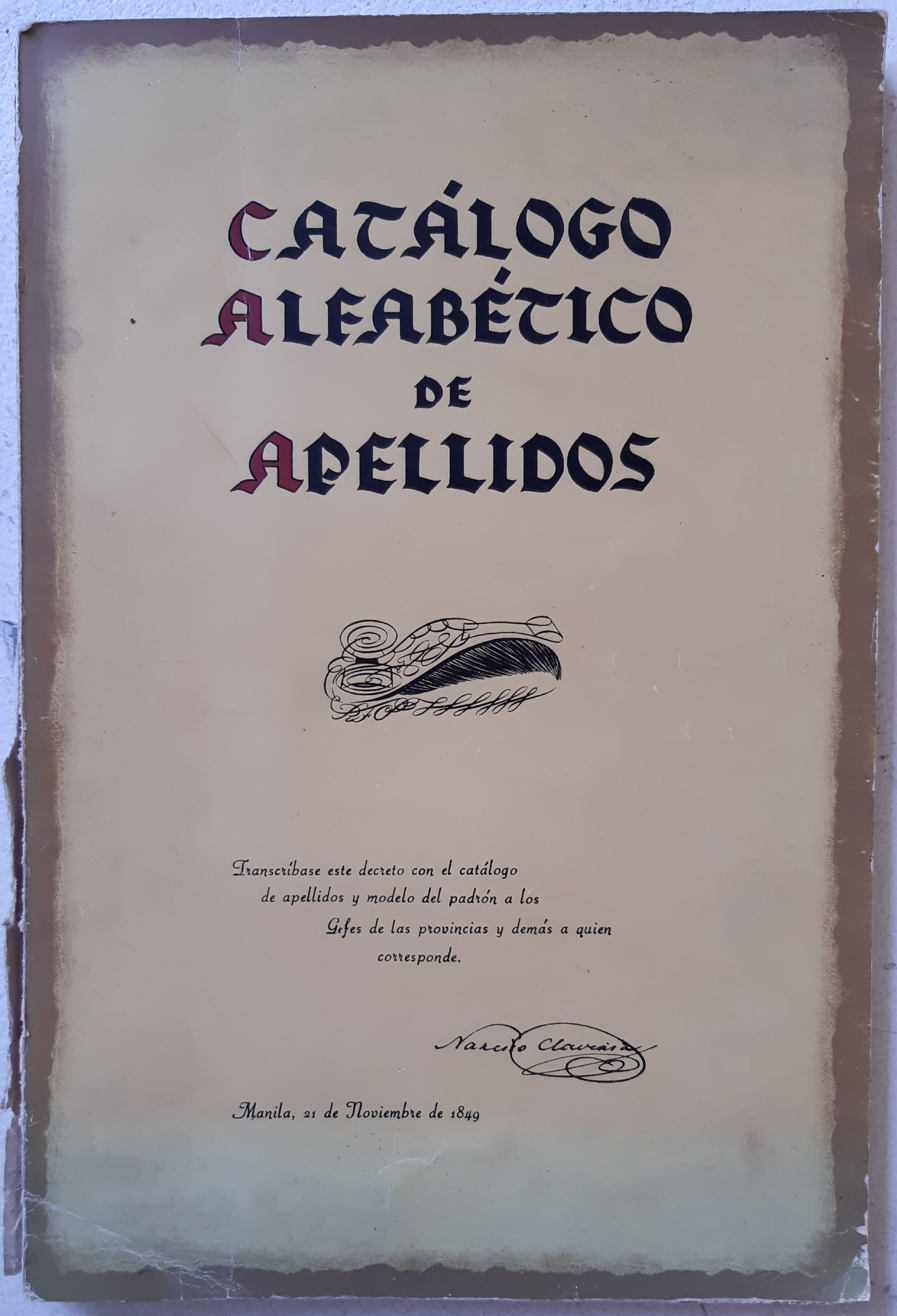
The Catalogo alfabetico de appellidos (1849)

Narciso José Anastasio Clavería y Zaldúa, 1st Count of Manila (Catalan: Narcís Josep Anastasi Claveria i Zaldua; May 2, 1795 – June 20, 1851) was a Spanish army officer who served as the Governor-General of the Philippines from July 16, 1844, to December 26, 1849.

Clavería is widely recognized as a reformist and modernizing administrator. He traveled through many provinces trying to learn the needs of Filipinos. He encouraged agriculture, improved the streets and suburbs of Manila, and succeeded in helping the country. He was given the title Count of Manila. The towns of Claveria in Misamis Oriental province, Claveria in Masbate province, and Claveria in Cagayan province were named in his honor.

His grandson, Narciso Clavería y de Palacios, 3rd Count of Manila, was an architect who designed the Toledo Railway Station.

== Early years ==
Narciso Clavería was a native of the Catalonian city of Girona, whose mother was of Basque origin. He became a member of Spain's General Staff in 1838, colonel in 1839, and lieutenant general in 1844. He became governor of the Philippines on July 16, 1844.

== Acts as Governor-General of the Philippines ==
=== Reformation of the Philippine calendar ===
The Philippines from 1521 to 1844 was one day behind the calendars of Asia, Europe and Americas. When Ferdinand Magellan sailed west around the world, he lost a few minutes every day. He was going the same way the sun was going, so his day ended later than that of the people who remained in Europe. Therefore, he was later in beginning the next day. By the time he reached the Philippines, he was a day behind Europe on his date. This error had been known for centuries. Finally, Clavería and the Archbishop of Manila, Jose Segui, agreed to remove Tuesday, December 31, 1844, from the Philippine calendar. So the day after Monday, December 30, 1844, was called Wednesday, January 1, 1845.

=== Surnames for Filipinos ===
From the days of the Spanish conquest, some Filipinos had received Spanish surnames. Most people, however, had no surnames, which caused confusion. On Wednesday, November 21, 1849, Clavería issued a decree sending long lists of Spanish and local surnames to the chiefs of the provinces. These were sent out to the different towns, and given to the locals who had no surnames. In many towns, all the names for people in that town began with the same letter of the alphabet. For instance, surnames starting with "A" applies for those who lived in Alimodian while those starting "M" apply for those who lived in Miagao.

=== First steamships in the Philippines ===
The first steam-powered warships to sail regularly in Philippine waters were the Magallanes, Elcano, and Reina de Castilla. They were brought from London in 1848. These steamships were of great value because now it was possible to chase and capture the swift boats of the Moro pirates from the South who used to raid the coastal villages north of them.

=== Spanish expedition to Balanguingui ===
Clavería organised an amphibious campaign against the pirates of the Samal Islands. He destroyed several towns and forts on the island of Balanguingui, between the islands of Basilan and Jolo, and released one hundred and thirty Filipino and Dutch captives (from Java) in 1848. For this successful military operation he received the titles of Count of Manila and Viscount of Clavería, and received the Knight Grand Cross of Royal and Military Order of San Fernando from Queen Isabella II, besides other rewards.

=== Reforming the governors of the provinces ===
From the earliest days, the chief of a province had acted both as governor and judge. He also engaged in trade, of which he had a monopoly. With multiple duties, it was not strange that the governors were often poor rulers. They knew little of the law and therefore they sent all the important cases to Manila. For this reason there were often long delays in processing cases. Sometimes it required years to get justice and this encouraged the strong to oppress the weak. Clavería therefore ordered that the governors be men of two years experience in the law.

Clavería mandated that the governors should not engage in trade. This decree was not fully obeyed for many years after the time of Clavería. At that time there were thirty-one provinces. The governor received a salary of from three hundred to two thousand Philippine pesos a year. The most common salary was six hundred pesos. In return for the privilege of controlling the trade of the provinces the governors paid the government as high as three thousand pesos a year. Men of high position tried to get these places. Often these fortunes were made by dealing unjustly or because of the monopoly they exerted in certain areas.

=== Other acts during his term ===
A casino called "Sociedad de recreo" (" Recreation Association ") was established on Thursday, October 31, 1844. Clavería's proposal to establish military library was approved on February 15, 1846. In 1846, following an official visit to the Bondoc Peninsula in Tayabas Province (now Quezon), he consolidated three sparsely populated villages into a single township called San Narciso in his honor, with the consensus of local leaders.

A monument to Ferdinand Magellan was erected on the south bank of the Pasig River in 1848. The regular clergy were forbidden to alienate property on January 15, 1849. His term was marked by intense activity, and a number of papers were founded, among them being the first daily newspaper of Manila, La Esperanza (December 1, 1846), and Diario de Manila (1848).

== Return to Spain ==
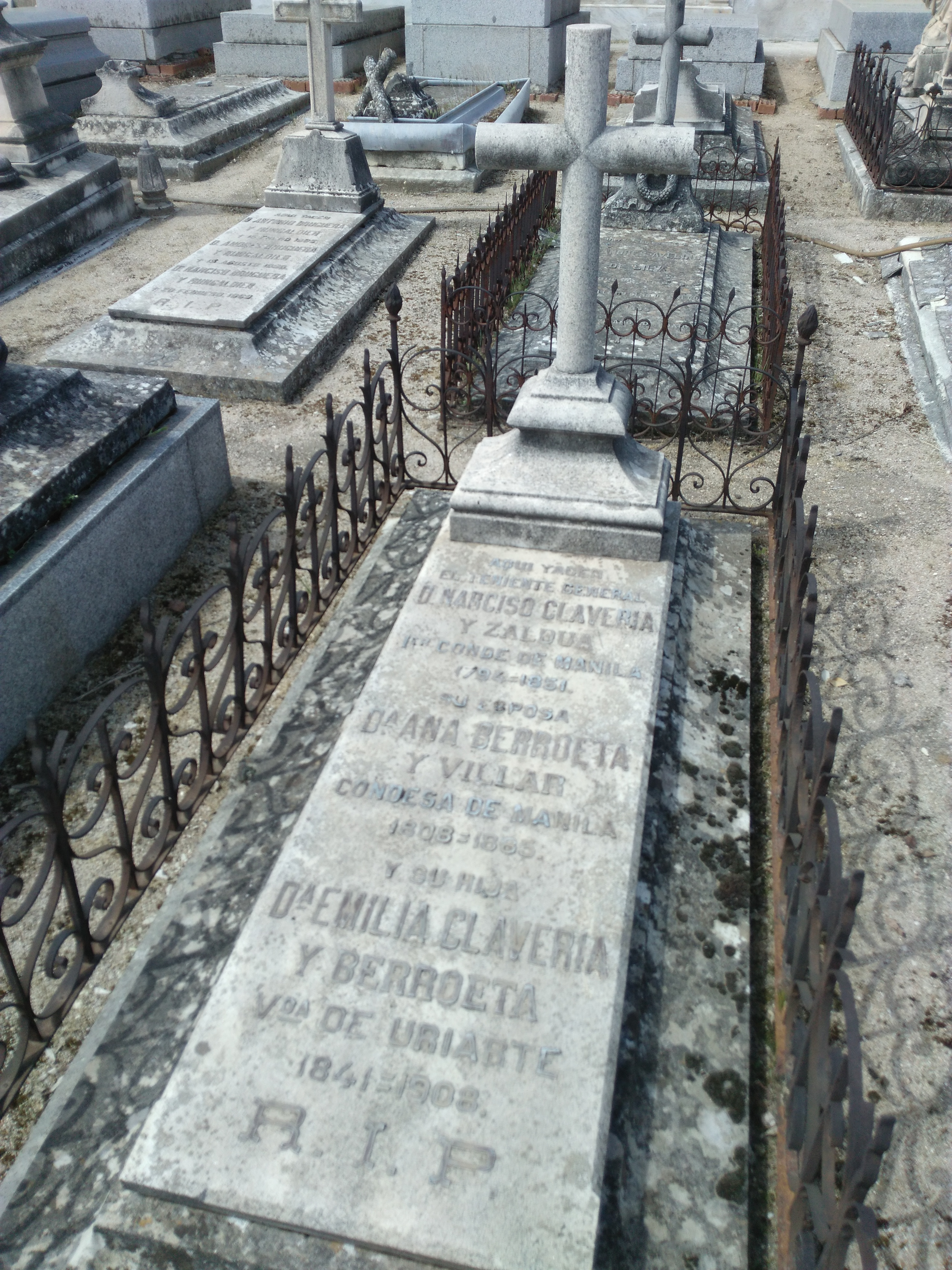
Grave of Narciso Claveria including his wife and their daughter at San Isidro Cemetery in Madrid, Spain.

In 1849, Clavería requested that he be allowed to retire. After which he left the position of governor-general and returned to Spain. He was a man of culture, probity, and industry. He was made a senator in 1850 but died the following year on June 20 in Madrid.

Political offices
Preceded by Francisco de Paula Alcalá de la Torre	Spanish Governor-General of the Philippines; 1844–1849	Succeeded by Antonio María Blanco
