= Narciso Clavería y de Palacios =

Spanish architect (1869–1935)

Narciso Clavería y de Palacios, 3rd Count of Manila (1869–1935) was a Spanish architect, notable as an exponent of the Moorish revival style known as Neo-Mudéjar. He was the grandson of Narciso Clavería y Zaldúa, a nineteenth-century Governor General of the Philippines from whom he inherited the title of Count of Manila.

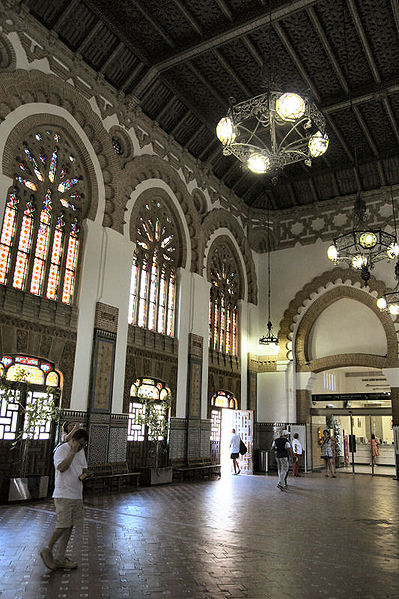
Toledo railway station, opened in 1919

== Railway architecture ==
Working for the railway company Compañía de los Ferrocarriles de Madrid a Zaragoza y Alicante (MZA), Clavería designed Toledo railway station, his best-known building. Clavería incorporated references to Toledo's architectural heritage, which he had spent some time photographing. The facility features a spacious hall with Moorish revival decoration and a clock-tower.

The smaller station at Algodor, between Toledo and Aranjuez, is also attributed to Clavería.

== Amateur photographer ==
He also cultivated photography as an amateur. In color he made more than 700 autochrome Lumière plates between 1909 and 1926. He was a member of the Royal Photographic Society of Madrid, where he projected his transparencies on glass. In autochrome images his favorite subjects were views of the city of Toledo, Madrid gardens, still lifes and family portraits. In black and white he obtained thousands of plates on his summer trips. For example in Asturias in 1899.

== External sources ==
- arteHistoria: Clavería, Narciso
