= Count of Manila =

Count of Manila (Spanish: Conde de Manila) is a Spanish hereditary title created in 1848 for Narciso Clavería y Zaldúa, Governor-General of the Philippines.

The Philippines were at the time a Spanish colonial possession. The title was a reward for the success of a military campaign, the expedition to Balanguingui.

== Counts of Manila ==
Narciso Clavería y Zaldúa, 1st Count of Manila.
