= Banguingui people =

Ethnolinguistic group of the Philippines

Banguingui
Total population
- 84,000

Regions with significant populations
- Bangsamoro, Zamboanga Peninsula

Languages
- Banguingui language, Tausug, Zamboangueño Chavacano, Cebuano, Filipino, English, Malay

Religion
- Predominantly Islam

Related ethnic groups
- other Sama-Bajau people, other Moros, Lumad, Visayans, other Filipino peoples, other Austronesian peoples

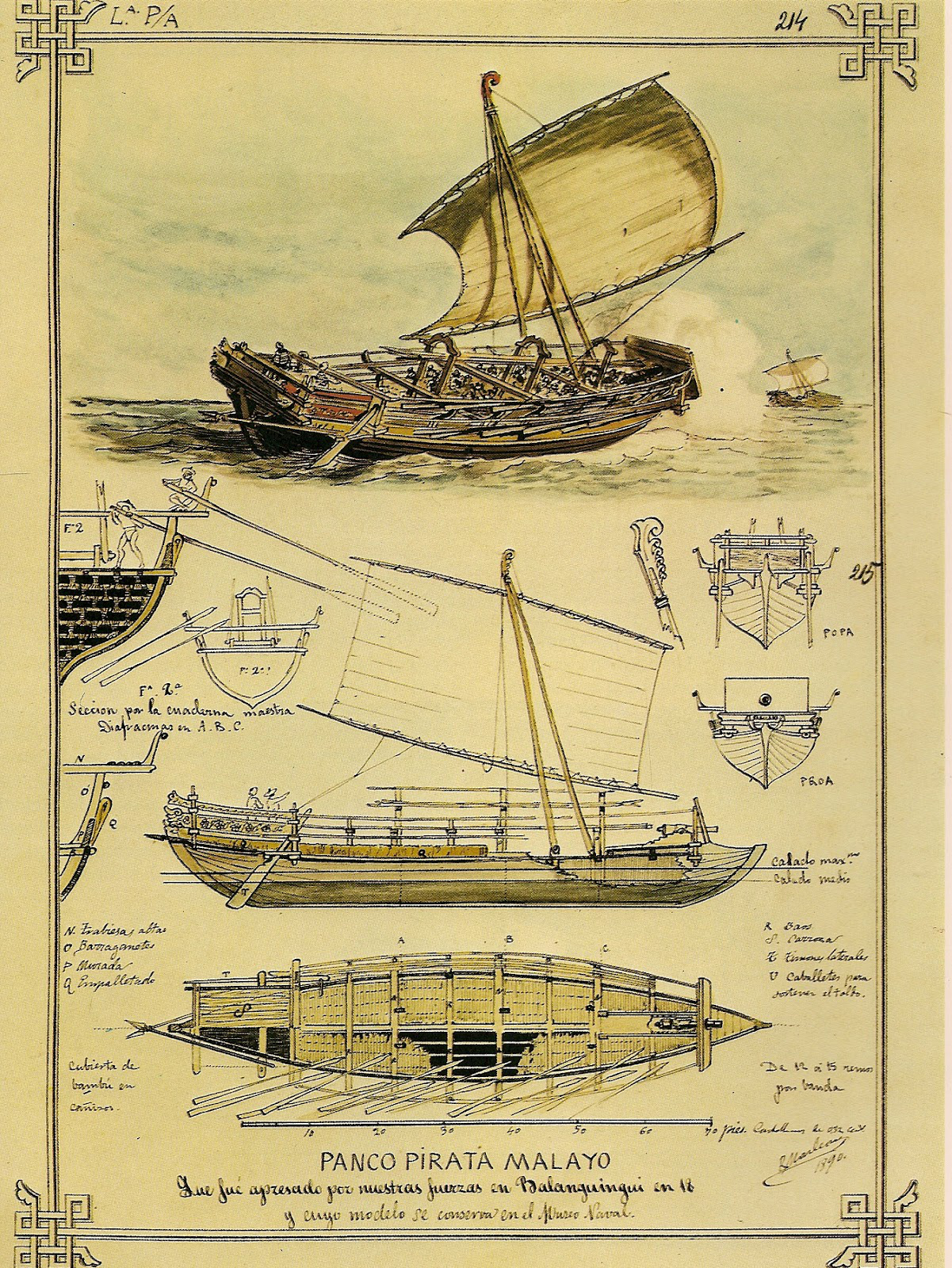
The garay warships of Banguingui pirates in an illustration by Rafael Monleón, based on museum models, c. 1850

Banguingui (Note: also known as Sama Banguingui. "The word " SAMA" it is a dialect of Bangungui tribe and Samal tribe is different from Sama Banguingui and they are not belong to Sama Banguingui tribe they are Luwaan or Pala'o or Bajau peoples.) (Note: (alternative spellings include Bangingi’, Bangingi, Banguingui, Balanguingui, and Balangingi)) is a distinct ethnolinguistic group native to Balanguingui Island but also dispersed throughout the Sulu Archipelago and southern and western coastal regions of the Zamboanga Peninsula in Mindanao, Philippines.

== Overview ==
The Banguingui language has both written and oral traditions. Its written language is in Jawi script and is fast becoming a dying tradition. Oral traditions are handed down by the kamattoahan (elders) to the kaanakan or anak baha-u (new generations).

The Banguingui built kuta (forts) throughout the Sulu Archipelago. Like their other Sama cousins, they sailed various ships like the vinta, salisipan, or bangka-bangka throughout the Sulu-Sulawesi region. At the height of the Sulu Sultanate, the Banguingui, along with the Iranun people, formed the bulk of the Sultan's navy, leading coastal raids against settlements in the northern Philippines, as well as the coasts of neighboring Borneo, Sulawesi, and the Maluku Islands. They were also heavily involved in piracy and the slave trade during the 18th and 19th centuries. The Banguingui usually sailed garay warships, in contrast to the lanong of the Iranun.

== Notable Banguingui ==
- Maas Ilidji – a mariner who gain fame during a battle in Brunei Bay, where he was the "Batarah Shah" of the Sulu Sultanate's military forces, comrprised of 300 "adjungs."
- Maas Arolas Tulawie – one time governor of the Province of Sulu and patriarch of the Tulawie Clan. His descendants include some of the political leaders in the province. Their stronghold is the Municipality of Talipao in the eastern region of Jolo Island.
- Imam Jai Dionga – First cousin of Maas Arolas Tulawie and barrio captain of Buan Island in the Province of Tawi-Tawi for more than three decades. He is well respected by Tausug, Bajau and Sama alike. He was one time Vice Mayor of the Municipality of Balimbing (now Panglima Sugala).
- Panglima Alip - Progenitor of the Tulawies of Sulu and Diongas of Tawi-Tawi, was overlord of Tongkil in the 19th century reporting directly to the Sultan of Sulu.
- Muhammad Tulawie - a famous Moro educator during the American Occupation of Sulu, he was the brother of Arolas Tulawie. He used to visit the houses of his people in Jolo to encourage the parents to send their children to school. In honor of his services to his people, the Jolo Central School was renamed Muhammad Tulawie Central School.
- Mayor Lincoln Aguilar Tulawie - known as "Mayul Lincoln" of Talipao. He was acknowledged as the savior of the people of Pata, during Martial Law. The Pata Massacre was a tragedy involving the massacres of the civilians by the government forces. Civilians were rounded up by the military and were made to live in a camp. Men were tortured and killed daily, women were raped, and the rest of the population in the camp were starved. Mayul Lincoln who was a provincial board member at that time, initiated a move to relocate all the civilians in pata to Jolo. Thousands of people were saved and relocated to Jolo and neighboring municipalities.

== See also ==
- Spanish expedition to Balanguingui
- Ethnic groups in the Philippines
- Iranun people
- Garay (ship)
- Karakoa
