= Toledo railway station =

Railway station in Toledo, Spain

Toledo
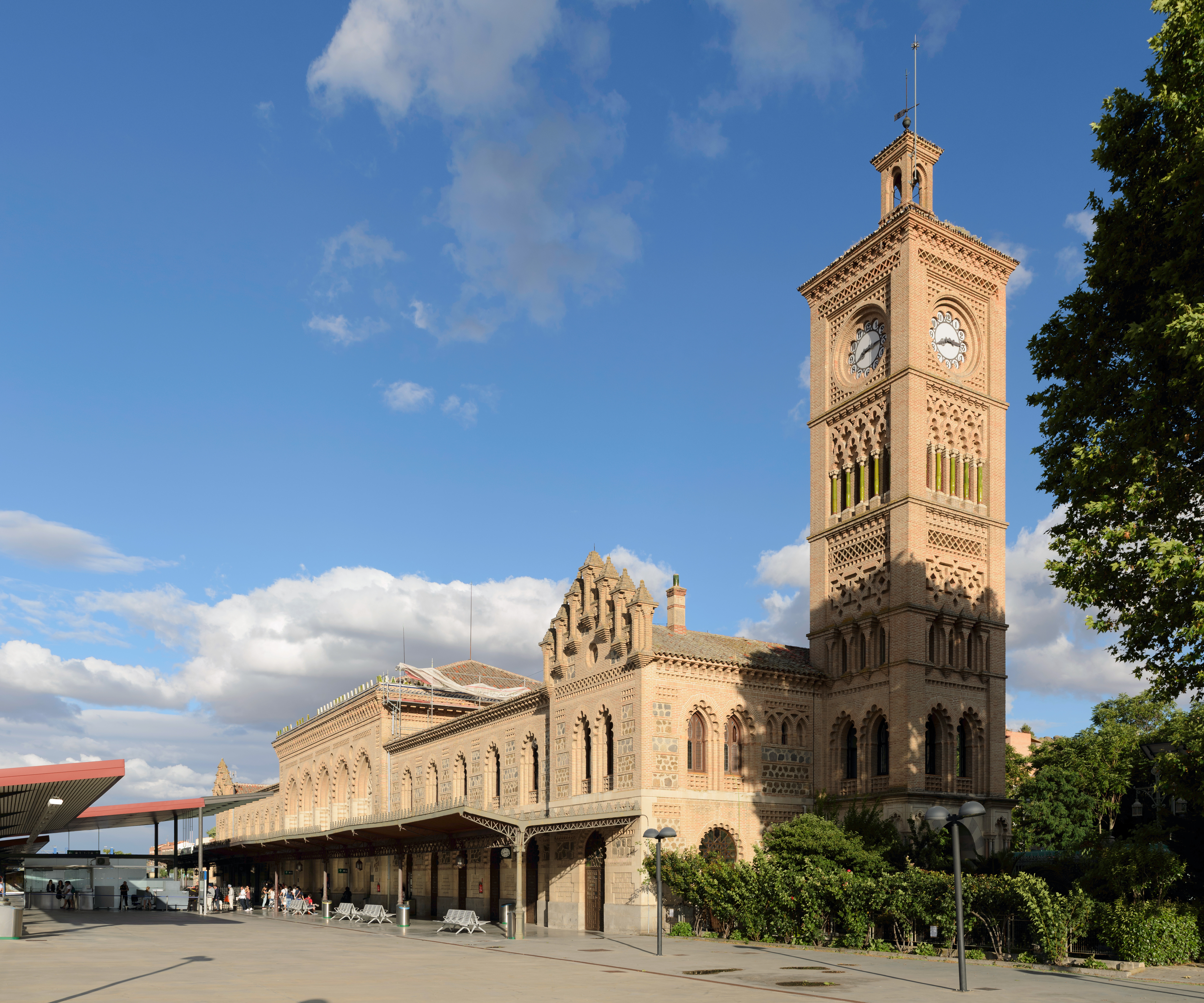

General information
- Location: Paseo Rosa, Toledo, Spain
- Coordinates: 39.8624°N 4.01125°W
- Owner: adif
- Platforms: 3

Construction
- Parking: 325

Other information
- Station code: IATA: XTJ

History
- Opened: 12 June 1858
- Rebuilt: 24 April 1919

Passengers
- 2018: 1,742,695
Location

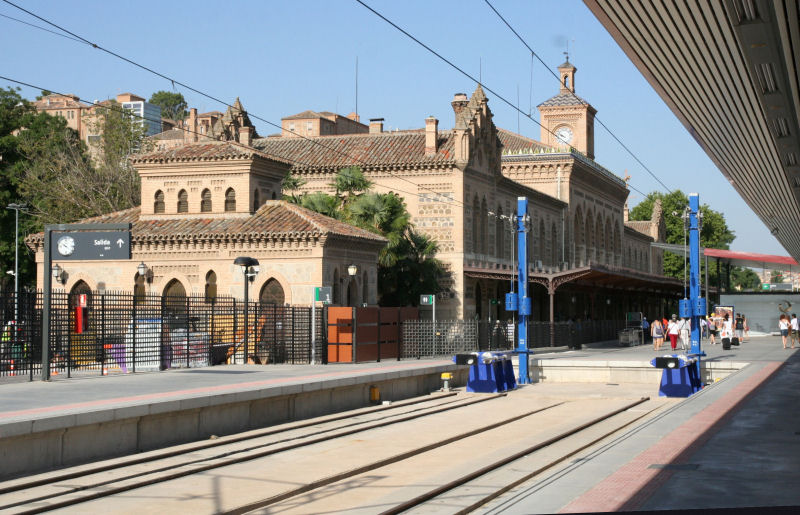
Platforms

The Toledo railway station is a railway station in Toledo, Spain, which was designed by architect Narciso Clavería y de Palacios in the Neo-Mudéjar style.

== History ==
The railway reached Toledo in 1858. The original station was of functional design and was opened on 12 June 1858 by Isabella II of Spain, accompanied by Francisco de Asís, Duke of Cádiz.

The present station opened on 24 April 1919. It was designed to echo the historic architecture of the city. The central section is flanked by two side naves, one of which is adjacent to the clock tower, which imitates the style of Toledo church towers.

The railway company responsible for the construction of Toledo station, the Compañía de los Ferrocarriles de Madrid a Zaragoza y Alicante, also built other stations in Neo-Mudejar style such as that of Aranjuez.

The station has been declared a Property of Cultural Interest and classified as a monument. It was restored in the twenty-first century in connection with the inauguration of the Madrid–Toledo high-speed rail line in 2005. The old line along the Tagus valley in the direction of Aranjuez has been dismantled, and Toledo no longer has a conventional line.

== Gallery ==
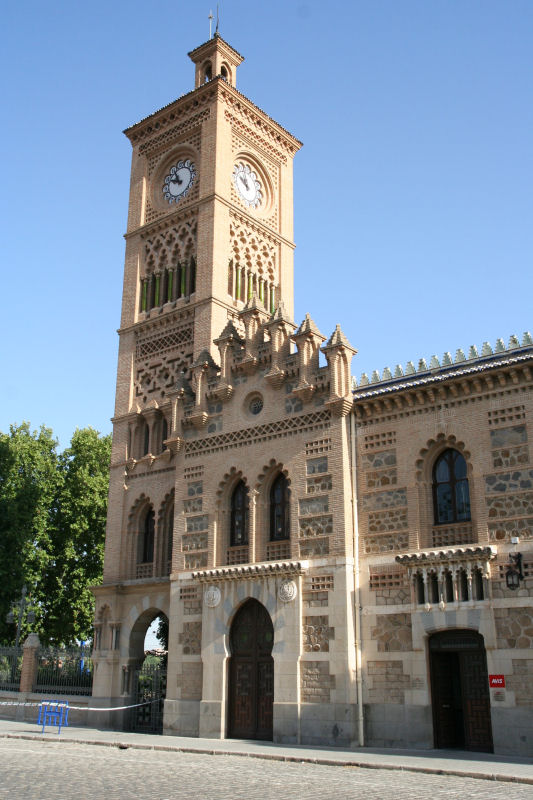
The tower

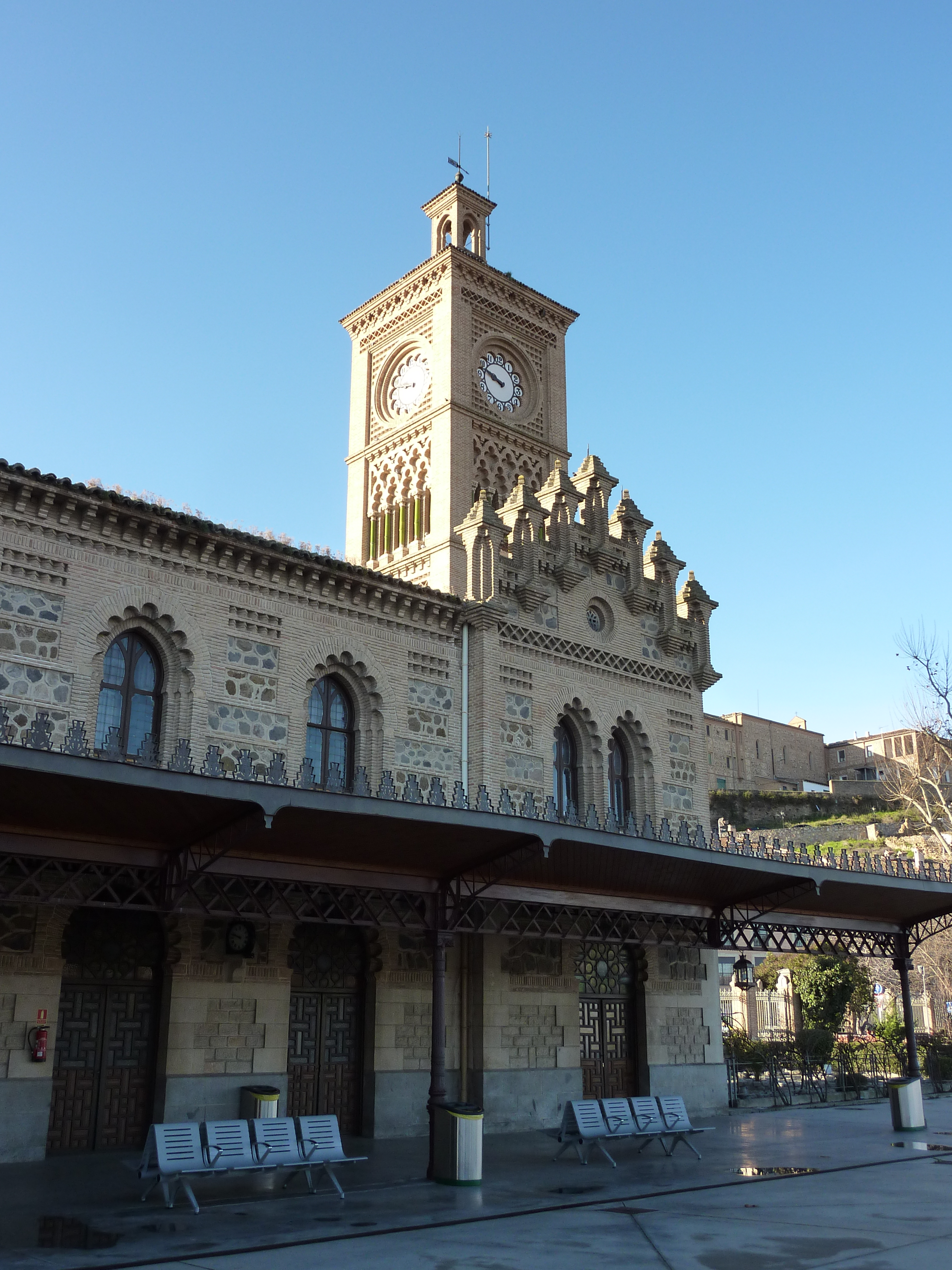
View from platforms

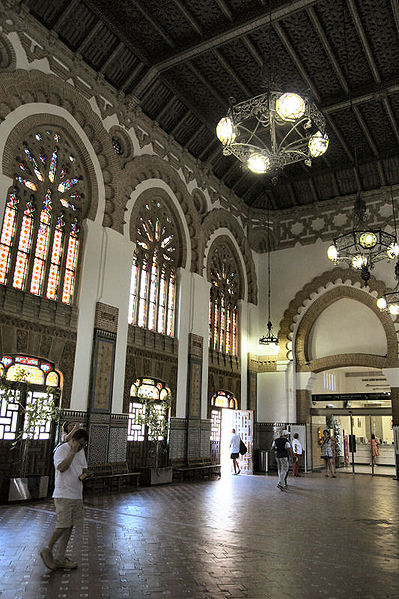
Hall

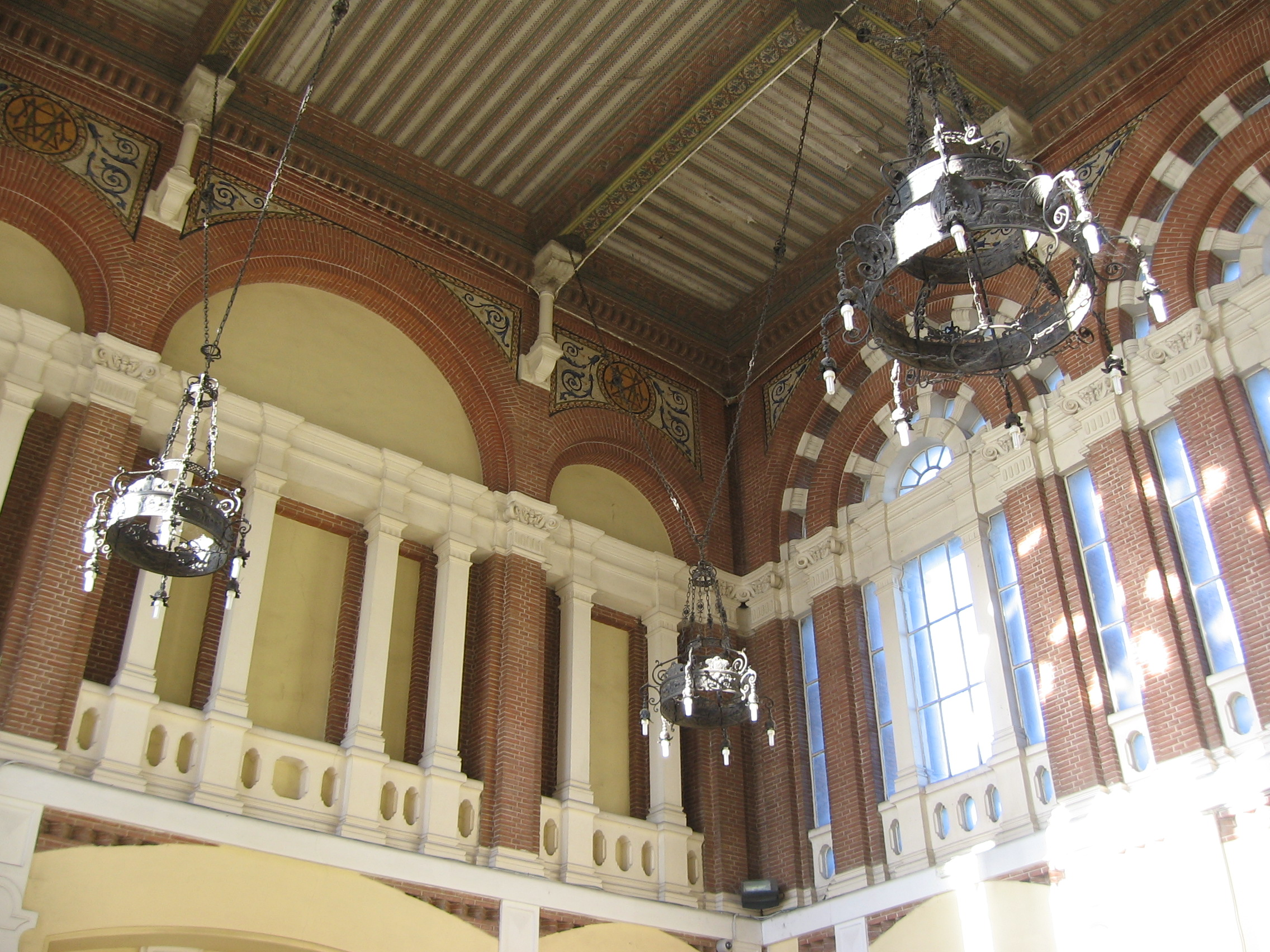
The station at Aranjuez is slightly later in date but presents similarities to Toledo station

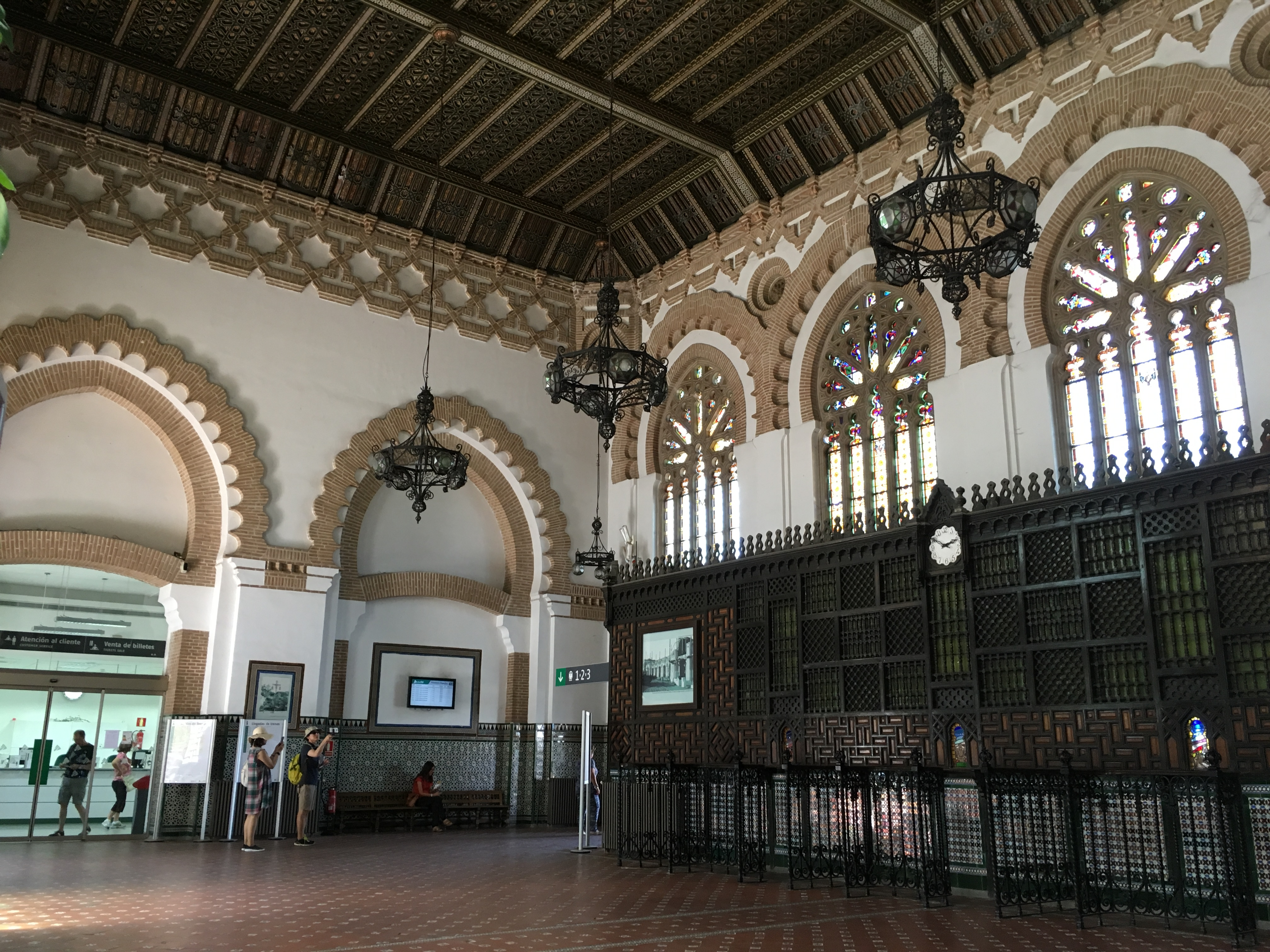
Hall of the station

The Toledo railway station, 1919

== See also ==
- Madrid-Toledo high-speed rail line

Preceding station	Renfe Operadora	Following station
Madrid Puerta de Atocha Terminus	Avant 87	Terminus
