= Inline skating =

Sport discipline

Hundreds of skaters skate into Manhattanhenge from Union Square

Inline skating is a multi-disciplinary roller sport and can refer to a number of activities practiced using inline skates. Inline skates typically have two to five polyurethane wheels depending on the style of practice, arranged in a single line by a metal or plastic frame on the underside of a boot. The in-line design allows for greater speed and maneuverability than traditional (or "quad") roller skates. Following this basic design principle, inline skates can be modified to varying degrees to accommodate niche disciplines.

Inline skating is commonly referred to as rollerblading, or just blading, due to the popular brand of inline skates, Rollerblade.

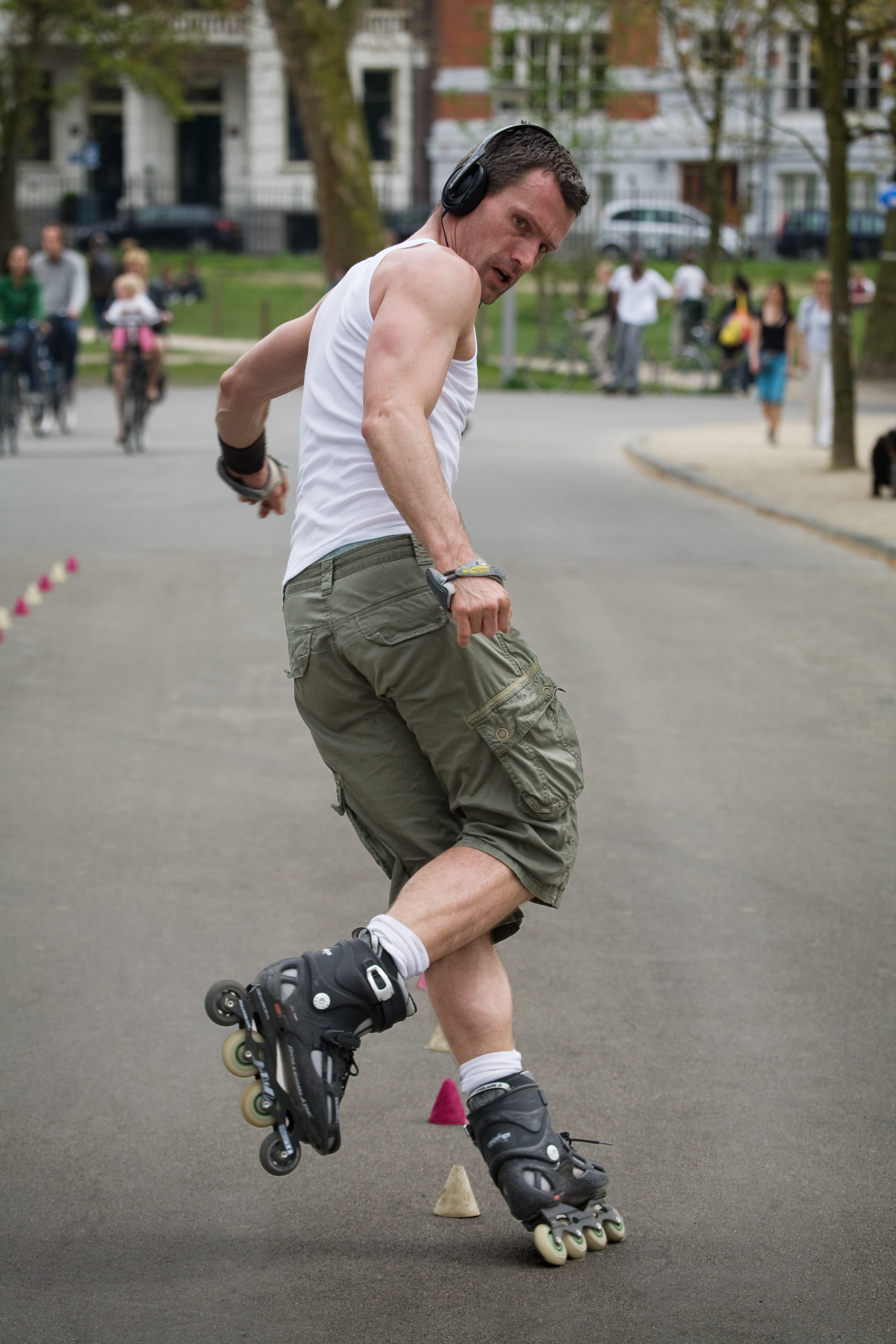
A man inline skating at Vondelpark in Amsterdam.

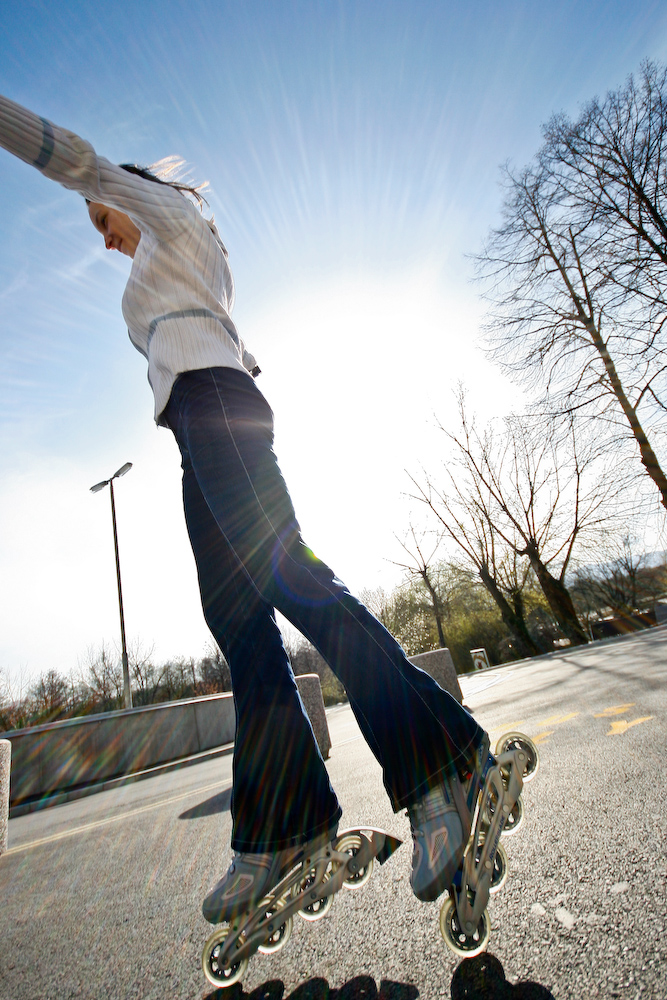
Recreational inline skating

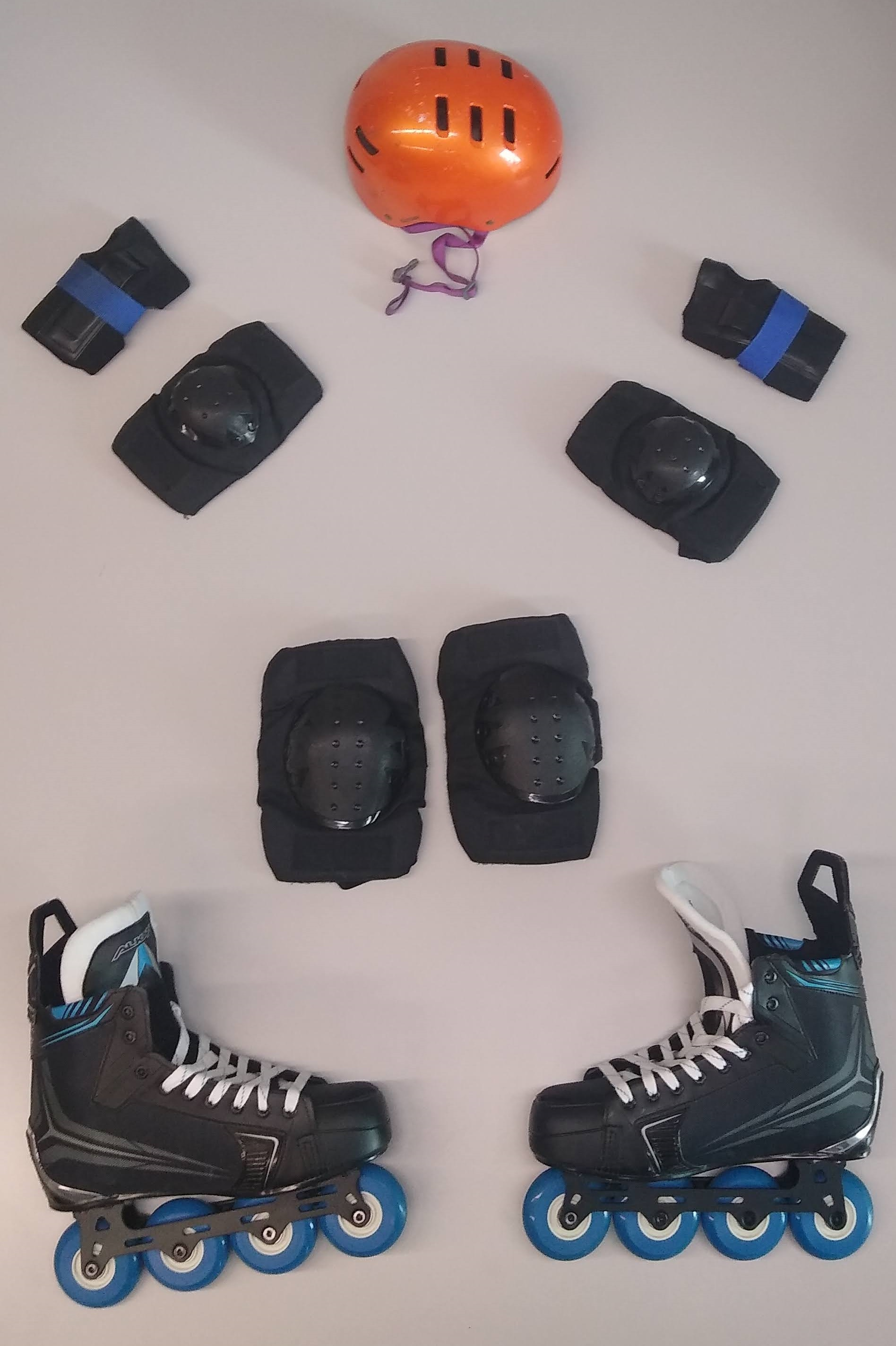
Typical In-line skating protective gear includes helmet, elbow pads, wrist guards, and knee pads.

== History of skating ==
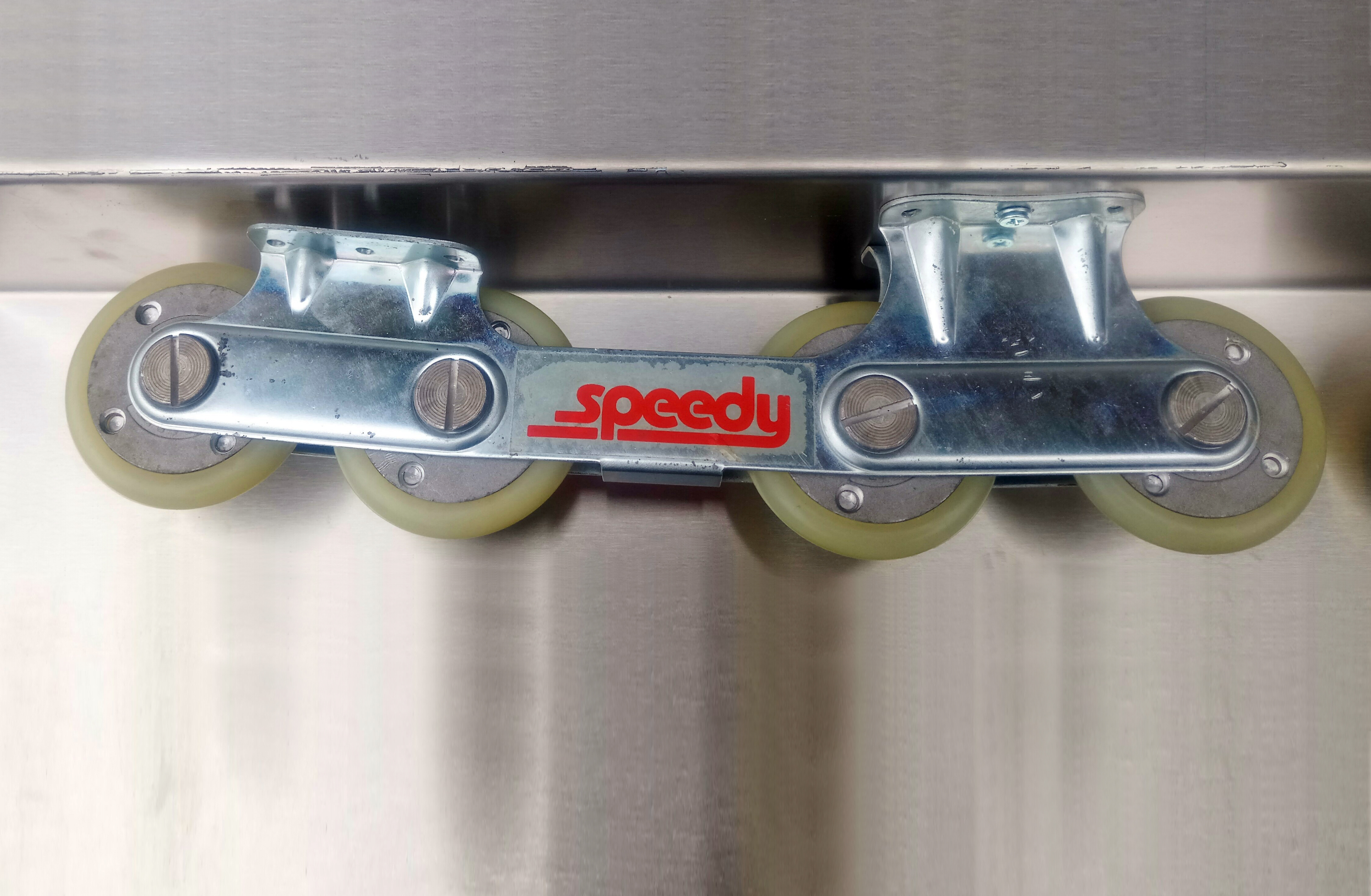
SKF-Speedy, 1978

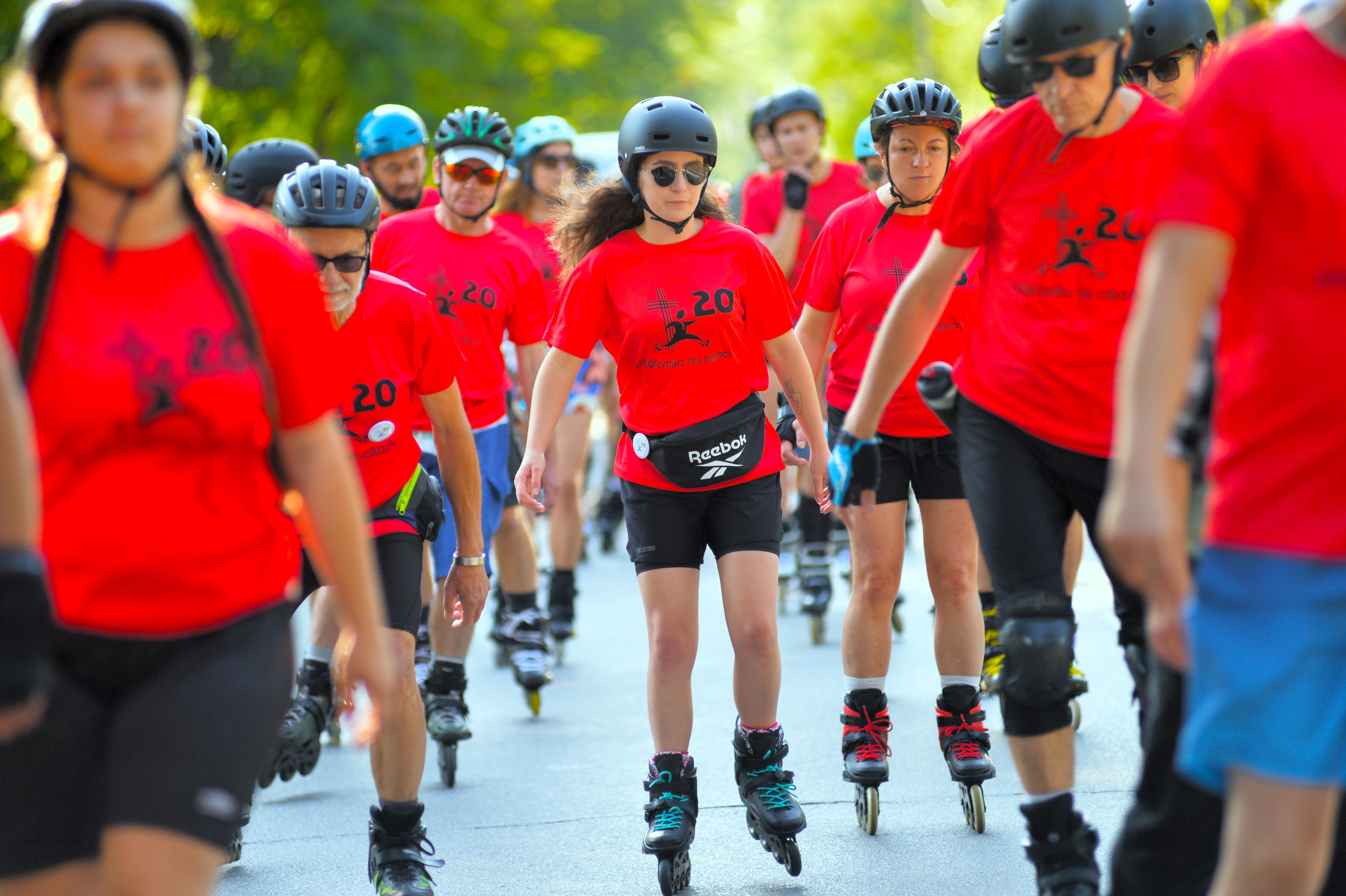
20th Inline-skating Pilgrimage Warsaw - Częstochowa - August 2023

An inline skate appeared in a Paris patent in 1819, but were overtaken in popularity by quad skates.

The German branch of SKF developed and produced inline skates in 1978 with wheels designed for hockey rinks and streets. The product was discontinued after one year as the management did not want a consumer product in its portfolio.

Other inline skates were developed as a substitute for ice skates. In 1980, a group of ice hockey players in Minneapolis, Minnesota, were looking for a way to practice during the summer. Scott and Brennan Olson formed the company Rollerblade, Inc., to sell skates with four polyurethane wheels arranged in a straight line on the bottom of a padded boot. They sold the company in 1984 to Bob Naegele jr., who advertised to the general public and sold millions. Life magazine published a photo of American skater Eric Heiden, training for the 1980 Olympics, using such skates on a Wisconsin road.

The sport became popular in the United States in the 1980s and 1990s, with tens of millions of participants. In 1996, Jason Lewis completed the first solo crossing of the United States on inline skates, part of Expedition 360, a successful attempt to circumnavigate the globe using only human power. En route he was hit by a car in Colorado, breaking both legs. After nine months he completed the journey from Fort Lauderdale to San Francisco. In 2012, Kacie Fischer became the first woman, and the fastest person, to inline skate across the United States; she skated from California to Florida in 47 days. Aggressive inline skating events were featured in the X Games from 1995 to 2005. Popularity waned in the 2000s, with parental concerns over injuries and the rising popularity of soccer, lacrosse, and skateboarding. There was a revival sparked by the need for socially distanced recreation during the COVID-19 pandemic. In 2000 in India took place the first recorded inline skating (and roller skating) pilgrimage. Since 2002, inline-skating pilgrimages have been regularly organized in Poland. The oldest is the Christian inline-skating pilgrimage from Warsaw to Częstochowa (approx. 300 km). A regularly organized pilgrimage also runs from Wrocław to Częstochowa (over 200 km).

Some disciplines are part of World Games.

== Disciplines ==
=== Aggressive inline ===
Aggressive inline skating

Aggressive inline skating (referred to by participants as rollerblading, blading, skating or rolling) is a sub-discipline primarily focused on the execution of tricks in the action sports canon. Aggressive inline skates are specially modified to accommodate grinds and the jumping of large gaps. Aggressive skates are identifiable by a prominent gap in between the second and third wheels (known as the H-block) which allows for grinds perpendicular to the direction of the wheels.

A hard plastic surface on the sole of the boot known as a "sole plate" or "soul plate" allows for grinds parallel to the wheels. From these grind surfaces comes a lexicon of well-known grind stances, though sliding can occur on any surface of the boot or wheels. Aggressive skates typically have much smaller wheels than regular inline skates. The small size allows for more freedom when grinding as there is less risk of catching on obstacles. These smaller wheels feature a flat profile to accommodate the impact from jumping tall heights.

==== Vert skating ====
A term used to refer to inline skates on a vert ramp–a half pipe with some vertical in it–usually between 6 and 24 in (15 and 61 cm). The intent of the skater is to build speed until they are of sufficient height above the edge of the ramp to perform various aerial acrobatics. In competitions, skaters have limited time, often less than a minute, to impress the judges by landing numerous difficult tricks. Vert skating may occur in competition and was once part of the X Games. Vert ramps are also present in many skate-parks.

=== Inline figure skating ===
Inline figure skating

Inline figure skating is similar to its counterpart on ice, but it is more affordable in warmer climates. Inline figure skating has been included in the world championships since 2002.

=== Fitness/recreational skating ===
Recreational skaters usually skate on roads, bike lanes, or paved trails. They might be skating solo for transportation, fitness, skating with friends, or participating in an organized event. Because urban areas tend to have more hazards from traffic, many cities have organized social groups to make skating safer.

Fitness skaters tend to skate more frequently and go longer distances. Fitness skates typically have faster bearings and larger wheels to generate speed and cover ground more efficiently. Skaters in this category tend to skate 10–15 miles per hour (16–24 km/h) on average. Some challenge themselves to feats of endurance skating for over 30 miles (48 km).

Urban skating is a variety of recreational skating.

=== Freestyle skating ===
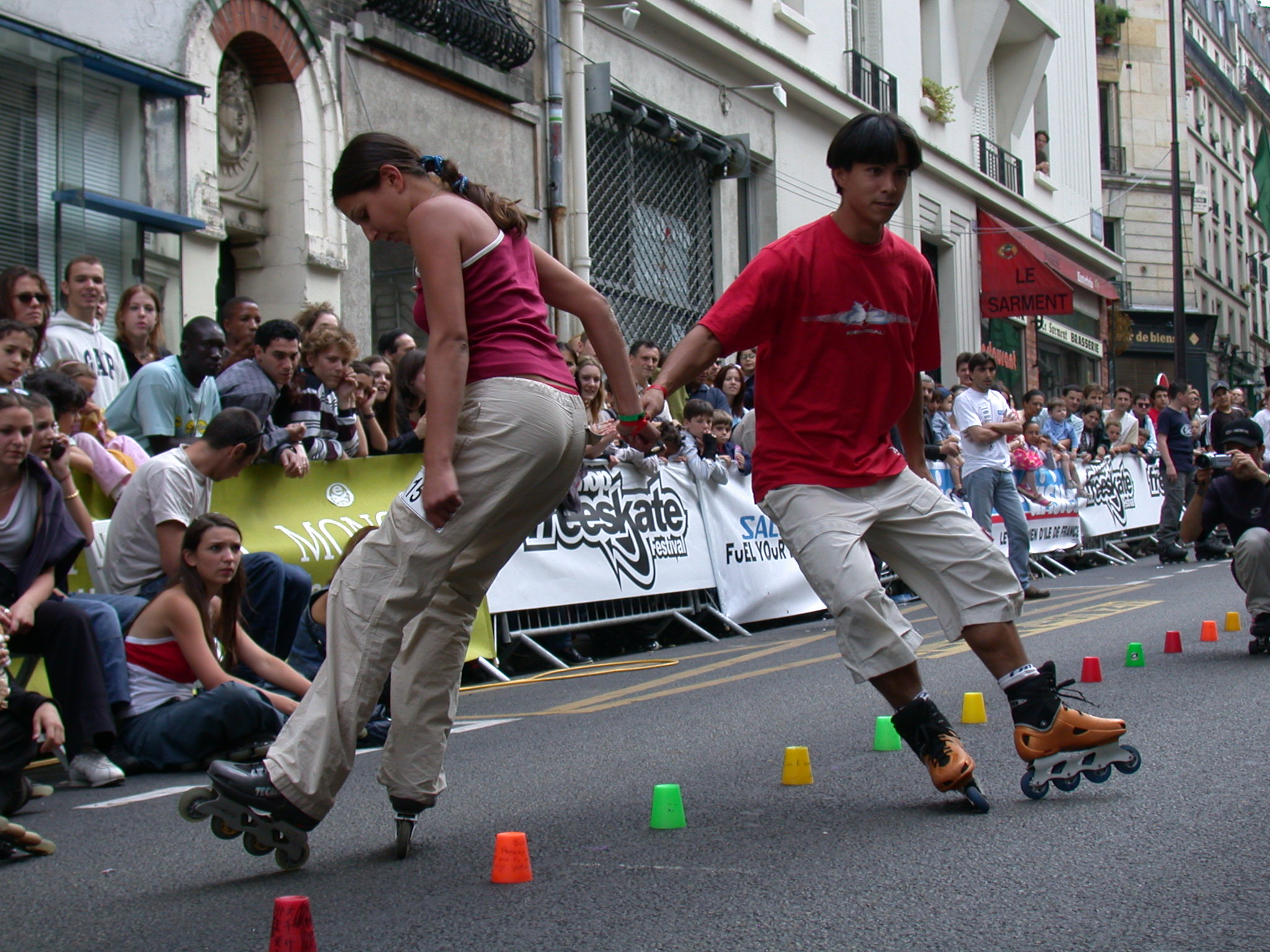
Freestyle slalom skating

Freestyle skating is a form of inline skating performed on flat ground and refers collectively to the disciplines for which competitions are organized by the World Skate. Currently World Skate has defined six disciplines which must be offered by any competition they sanction:

- Freestyle slalom classic
- Freestyle slalom pair
- Freestyle slalom battle
- Speed slalom
- Freestyle slide
- Free jump

Three additional disciplines, team speed slalom, high jump and jam, are also defined, but are at present considered optional.

==== Skate cross ====
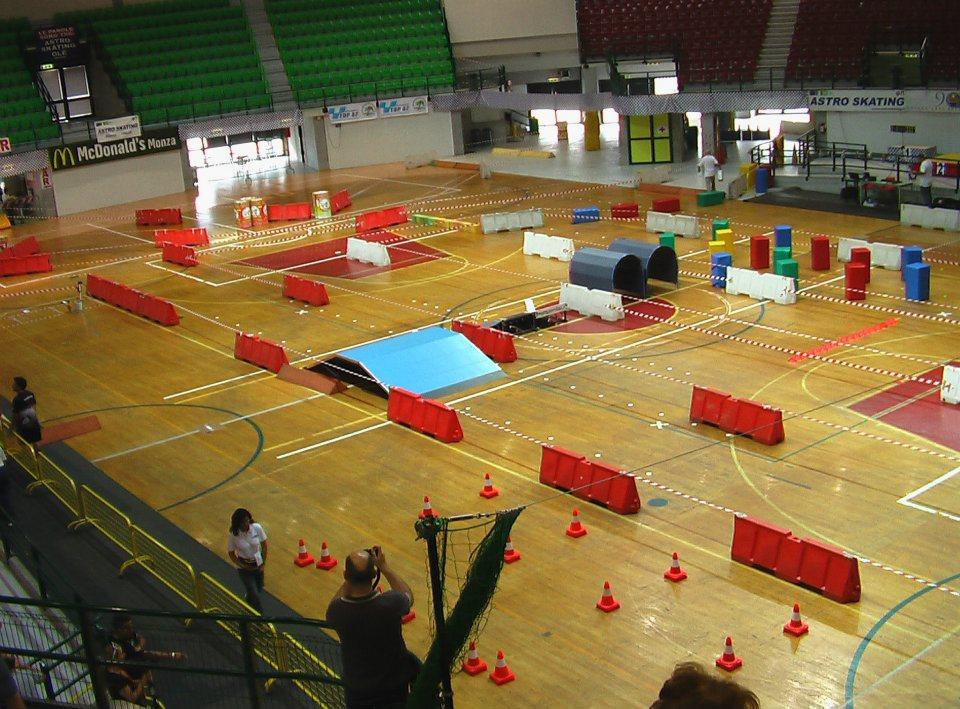
Skate cross

Skate cross is an inline skating discipline in which four skaters start side by side and race around an indoor or outdoor track with turns and obstacles, similar to a BMX racing track. It is part of the World Skate Games since 2023.

Like ski cross and kayak cross, each skater wears a different color bib. The two first skaters to cross the finish line advance to the next round, until the final round. In team cross, two teams race each other and the team with the last skater to cross the finish line is eliminated from the next round.

=== Speed skating ===
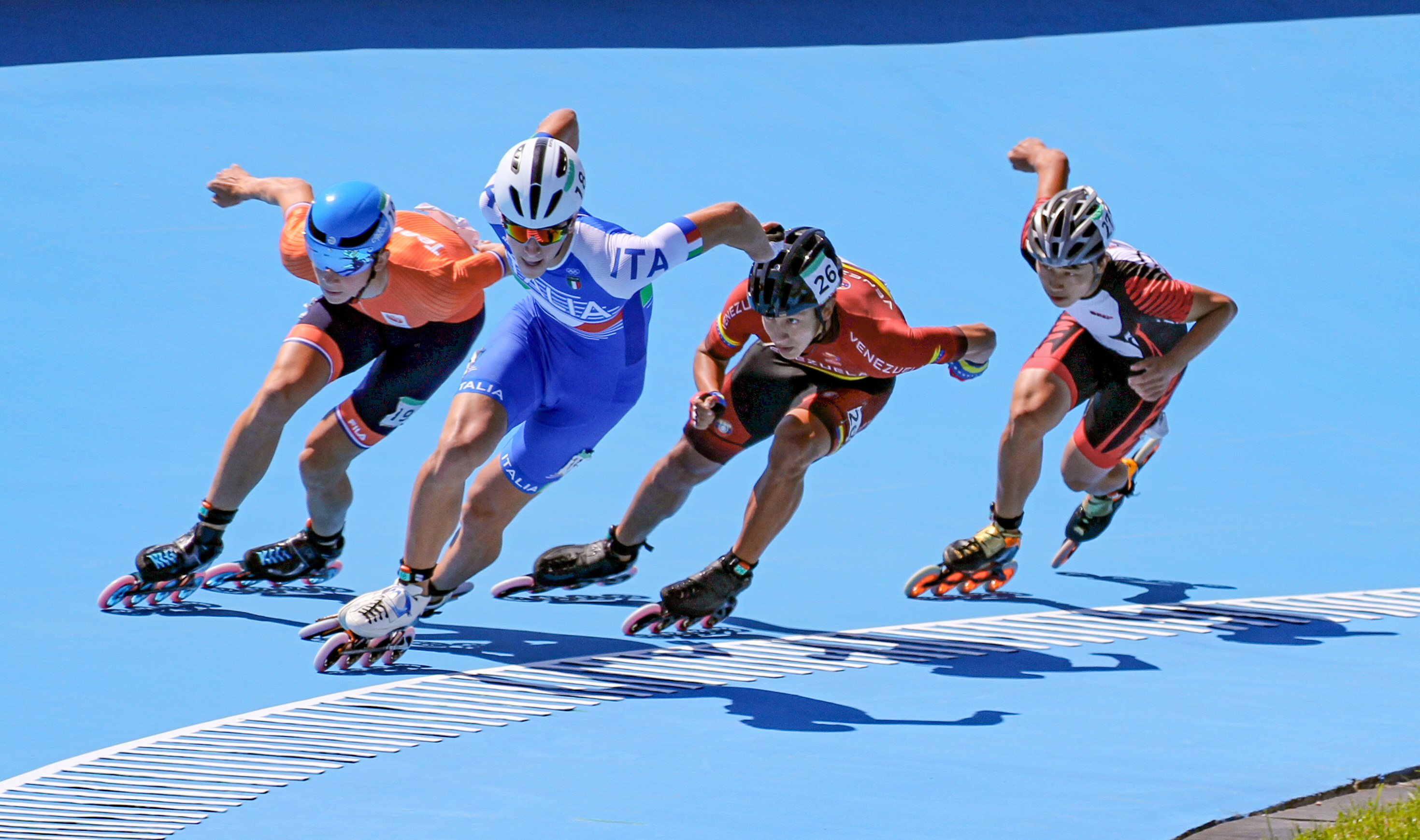
Roller skaters at the 2018 Summer Youth Olympics

Roller speed skating is the roller sport of racing on inline skates. The sport may also be called inline racing or speed skating by participants. Although it primarily evolved from racing on traditional roller skates, the sport is similar enough to ice speed skating that many competitors are known to switch between inline and ice speed skating according to the season. Some of its variants include track, road and marathon.

=== Downhill skating ===
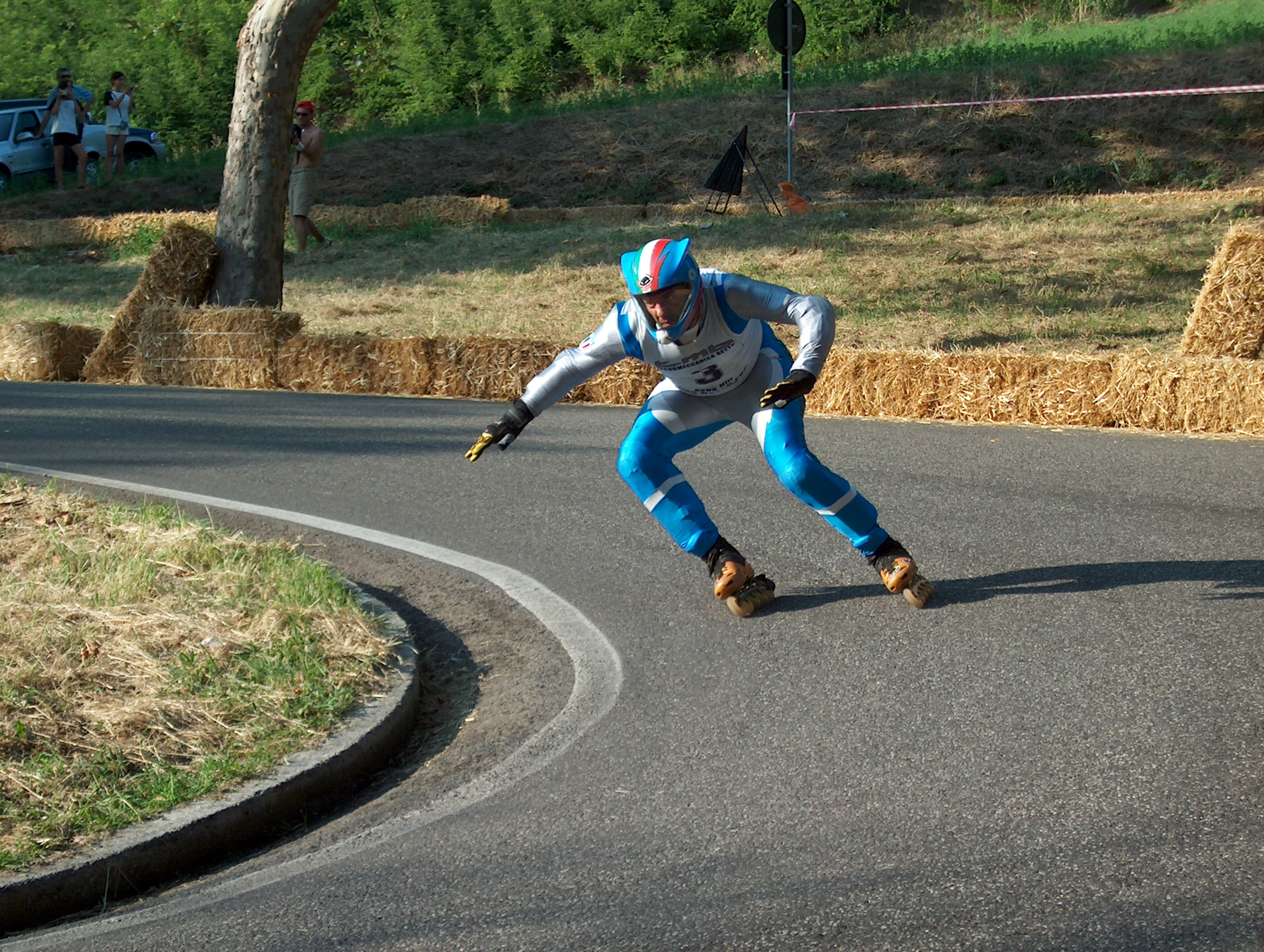
Inline downhill skating

A time trial event held in roads or in concrete bobsleigh courses in summertime. Downhill inline racers usually wear skates much more like "regular" inline skates than inline speed skates, along with extensive body covering and protective gear, and strong helmets.

=== Off-road skating ===
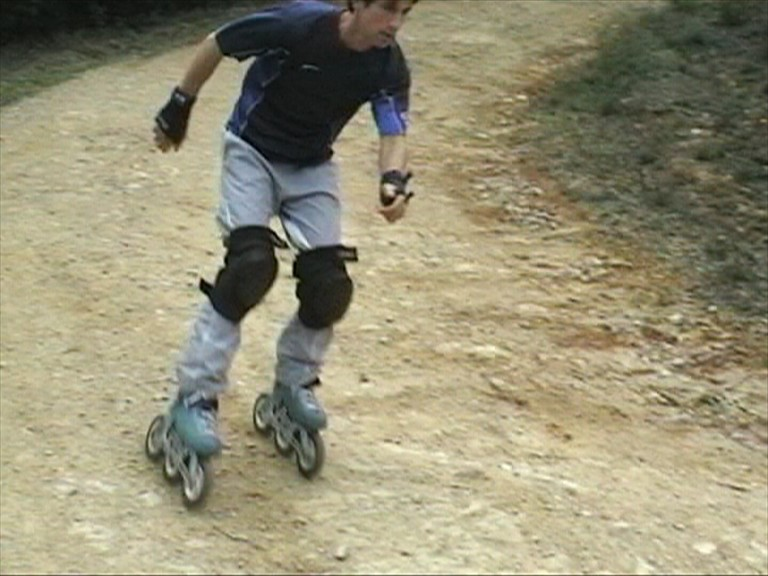
Off-road skating

Off-road skating is a form of inline or quad skating performed on unpaved surfaces. It typically uses skates with larger, pneumatic wheels, often three per frame for inline skates, allowing travel on surfaces such as hard-packed dirt, gravel, and forest trails, including in wet conditions. The larger pneumatic wheels and uneven terrain, however, create greater rolling resistance and make off-road skating more physically demanding than conventional skating.

=== Wizard skating ===
Wizard skating is a progressive style of inline skating that emphasizes fluidity, edge control, and creative movement. Unlike traditional aggressive or urban skating, which focuses on grinds, jumps, and rigid tricks, wizard skating incorporates deep carving, edge transitions, and dynamic footwork to create a smooth, flowing style.

The discipline was pioneered by Leon Basin, the founder of Wizard Skating and Wizard style frames, a specialized rockered frame system that enhances maneuverability and control. Wizard skating blends elements of freestyle slalom, artistic skating, and urban exploration, allowing skaters to navigate open spaces with seamless, dance-like motions.

Since its rise in the early 2010s, wizard skating has gained popularity worldwide, attracting skaters from various backgrounds, including aggressive, urban, and freestyle disciplines. Its emphasis on edge control and fluid motion has made it a distinct and evolving art form within the broader inline skating community.

=== Goal sports ===
==== Hockey ====
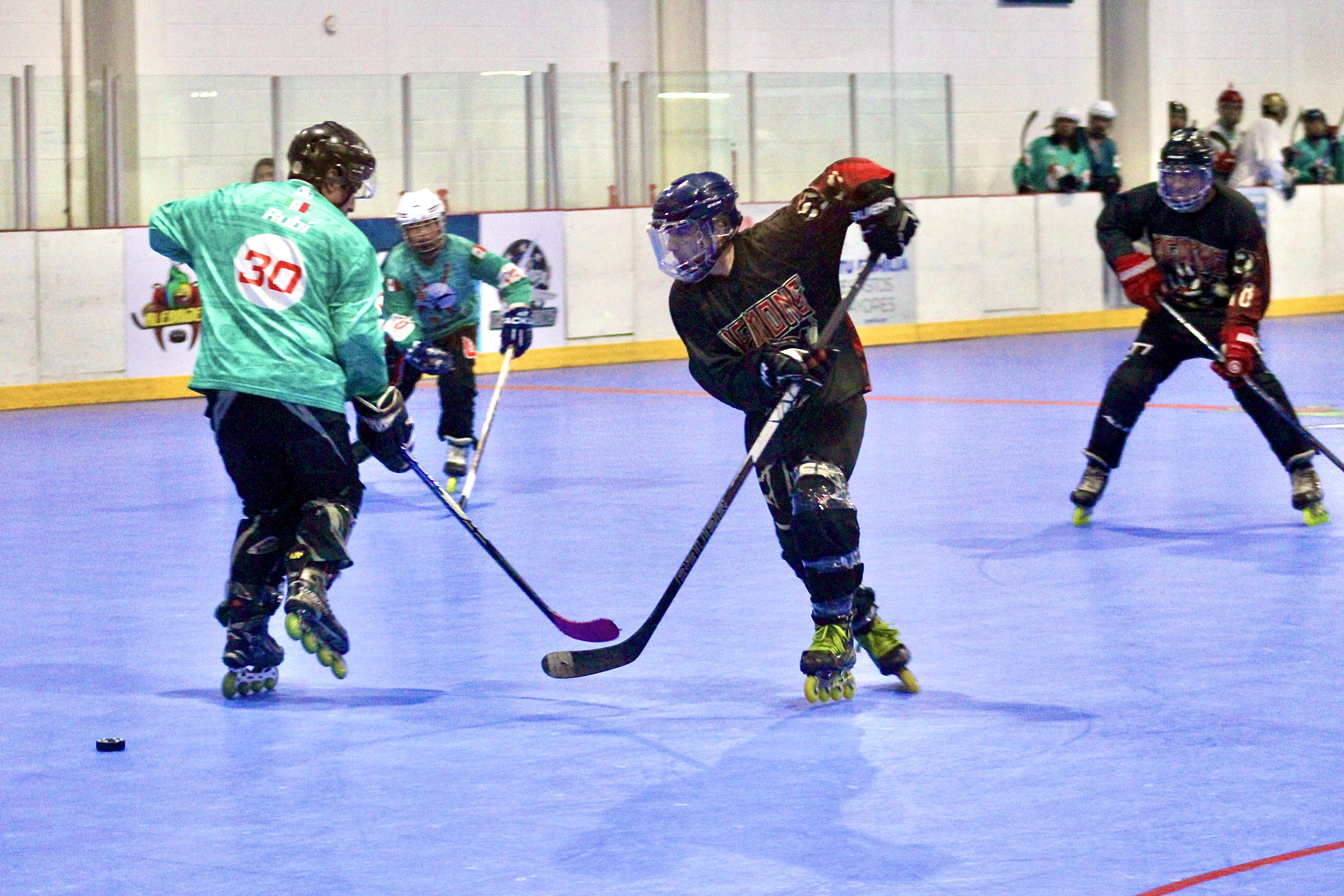
Inline hockey

Inline hockey is performed in a special rink on inline skates and was originally thought of by ice hockey players who wanted to continue training in their off season. Hockey rollerblades have wheel sizes generally between 72–80mm. The toe end of the boot is characteristically squared off. The feel of the boot is generally the same as ice skates, so the switch off between hockey skates and hockey is diminished, leading to better in-training simulations of ice hockey.

==== Roller soccer ====
Similar to soccer, football skating involves five players with skates on each side and takes place in an indoor sports hall or outside space with appropriate boundaries. Players need to score as many goals as possible with an official football skating ball size 5.5, and the team with the most goals wins the match.

=== Skiing inspired ===
==== Alpine skating ====
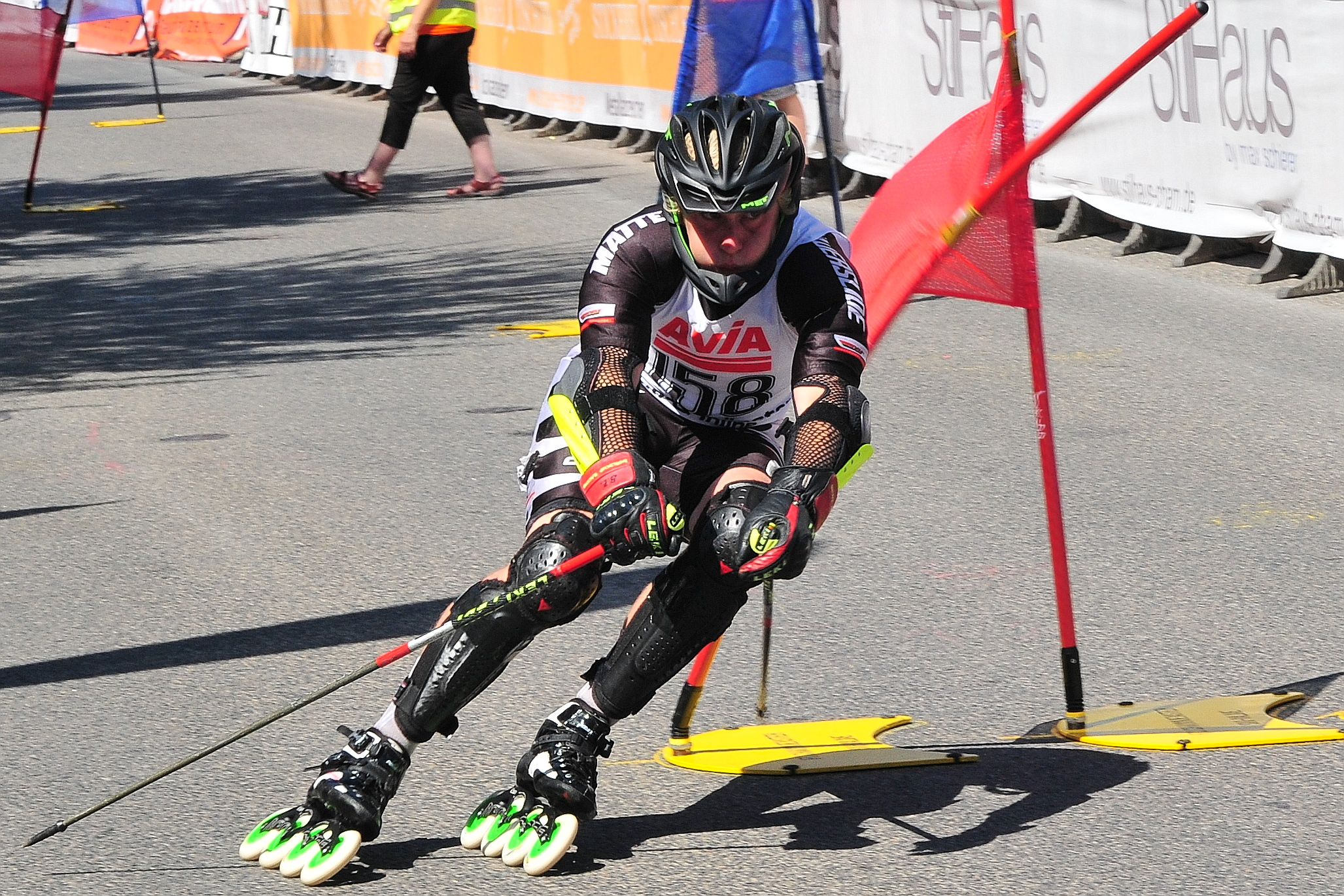
Inline alpine skating

Alpine skating, also known as inline slalom, on inline skates owes its existence to skiing, enabling skiers to train in the off-season despite a lack of snow. Skaters complete a course marked by gates while descending at high speeds. Its basic movements are therefore similar to those of downhill skiing and many athletes regularly practice both modalities.

==== Roller skiing ====
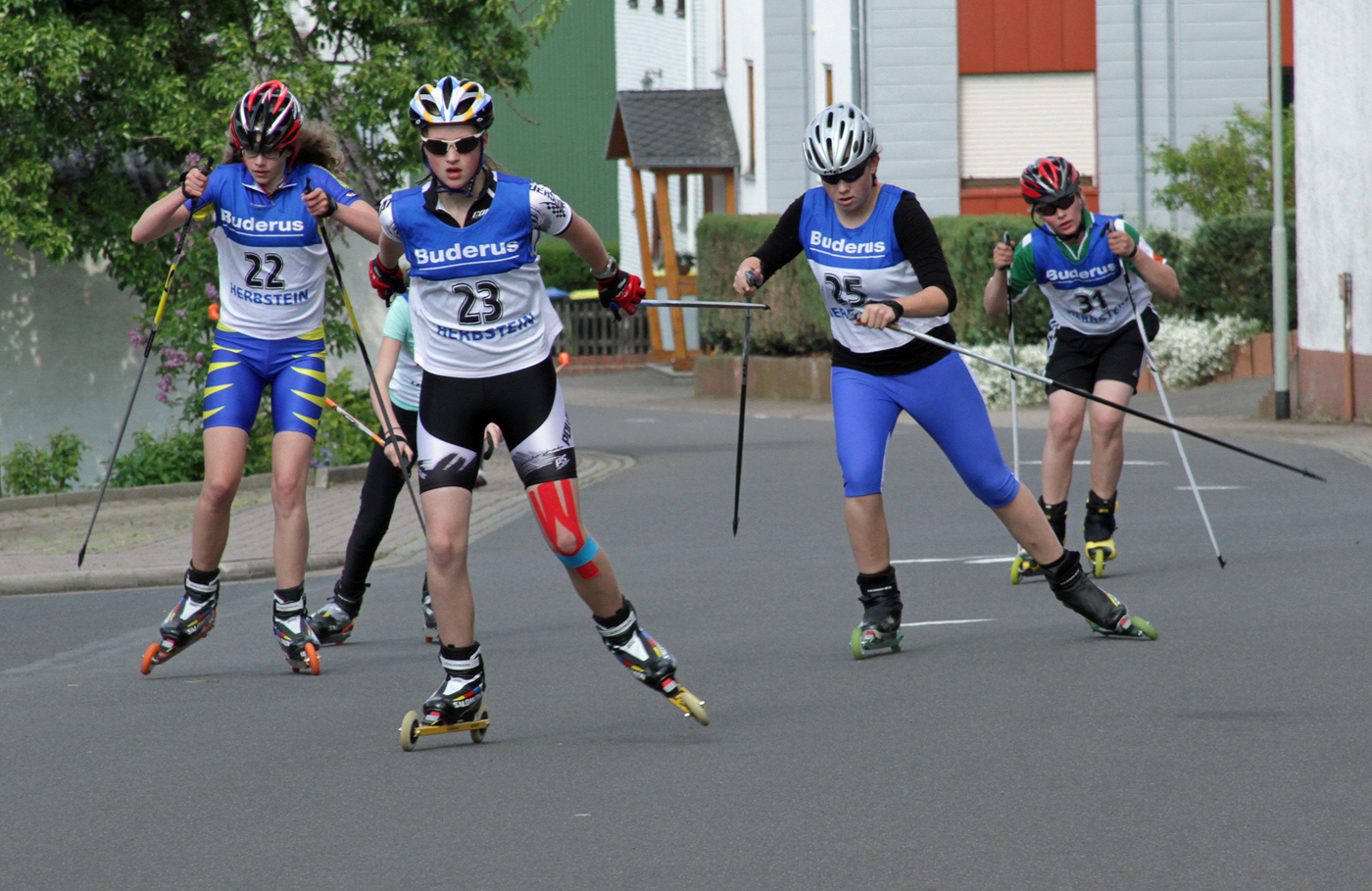
Roller skiing

Roller skiing is an off-snow equivalent to cross-country skiing. Roller skis have wheels on their ends and are used on a hard surface to emulate cross-country skiing.

The skiing techniques used are very similar to techniques used in cross-country skiing on snow.

== Law enforcement ==
Inline skates are used for law enforcement by police and military around the world.

External videos
- Taliban seen patrolling streets of Kabul on rollerblades with AK-47s

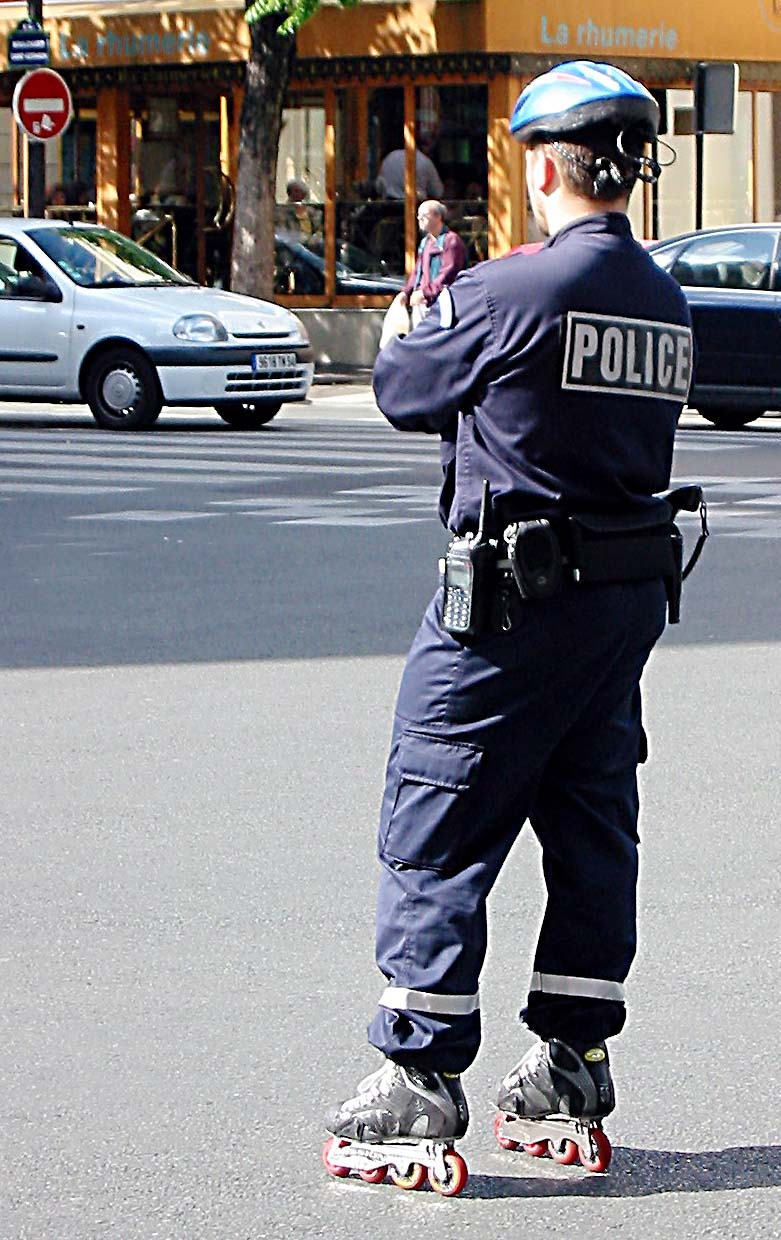
Police on skates

== See also ==
- World Skate Games
