= Expedition 360 =

First human powered circumnavigation around the globe

Expedition 360 was a successful attempt by Briton Jason Lewis to be the first person to circumnavigate the globe using only human power – no motors or sails. It was begun by Lewis and Stevie Smith in 1994 and ended at 12:24 pm on 6 October 2007, when Lewis re-crossed the prime meridian at Greenwich, London, having travelled 74,842 km (46,505 mi).

== Underlying definition ==
A true circumnavigation of the world must pass through two points antipodean to each other. Norris McWhirter, founding editor of Guinness, 1971.

[A] true circumnavigation of the Earth must: start and finish at the same point, traveling in one general direction, reach two antipodes, cross the equator, cross all longitudes, cover a minimum of 40,000km. AdventureStats by Explorersweb

== History ==
In 2006, the Adventure publication of the National Geographic Society honored Canadians Colin Angus and Julie Wafaei as Adventurers of the Year for their "journey around the world" by human power. The Society also stated that it does not "act as an official arbiter of geographic issues". Angus' journey did not cross the equator or hit the minimum of two antipodal points as stipulated by the rules of Guinness World Records or AdventureStats by Explorersweb. Additionally, in the February 2013 issue of Outside magazine, Angus's then-traveling partner Tim Harvey went on the record to say the pair "put up an emergency sail, using it for about 95 nautical miles" crossing the Bering Sea between Alaska and Siberia. As journalist Nick Heil pointed out, this alone was enough to disqualify a human-powered claim of any description.

The only other person to have completed a legitimate human-powered circumnavigation is Turkish-American adventurer Erden Eruç who completed the first solo circumnavigation between July 2007 and July 2012.

Stevie Smith developed the concept of the Expedition 360 global circumnavigation while he was working in an office in Paris. Smith's friend Jason Lewis joined the project and the pair raised money for a pedal boat, which was built by Chris Tipper and Hugo Burnham. The specially-built vessel was named the Moksha, a Sanskrit word that means freedom. To raise cash Stevie bicycled to Marrakesh, Morocco. Neither Smith nor Lewis had received formal training in cycling or in operating pedal boats.

== The Expedition ==
=== European leg ===
Smith and Lewis set off on bicycles from Greenwich, London at midday on 12 July 1994. They cycled south-east across Britain to the coast at Rye, then pedalled across the English Channel, and then cycled south again across France through major cities including Paris and Orléans. The pair split up for a short while, meeting back up in Spain. They then travelled through Madrid, across Portugal and through Lisbon, finally arriving at Lagos on 29 September 1994. According to Smith, they slept outdoors, taking their sleeping bags into open places and sleeping under the stars.

=== The Atlantic Ocean ===
The trip across the Atlantic took 111 days, pedaling in two-hour day and four-hour night shifts. It ended in Miami.

=== North America ===
They crossed the North American continent on bicycles and skates. Skating near Pueblo, Colorado, Lewis was hit by a drunk driver and broke both of his legs. He spent 9 months in Colorado healing and resting.

=== Pacific ===
Lewis completed the journey across the Pacific in the Moksha. Smith quit the project in Hawaii.

=== Australasia ===
The next leg to be completed was Australia and Indonesia. The journey north used pedal boats, kayaks and bicycle. This leg of the circumnavigation in Australia was especially noteworthy, as Jason reached the antipode to his Atlantic crossing path.

=== Final legs ===
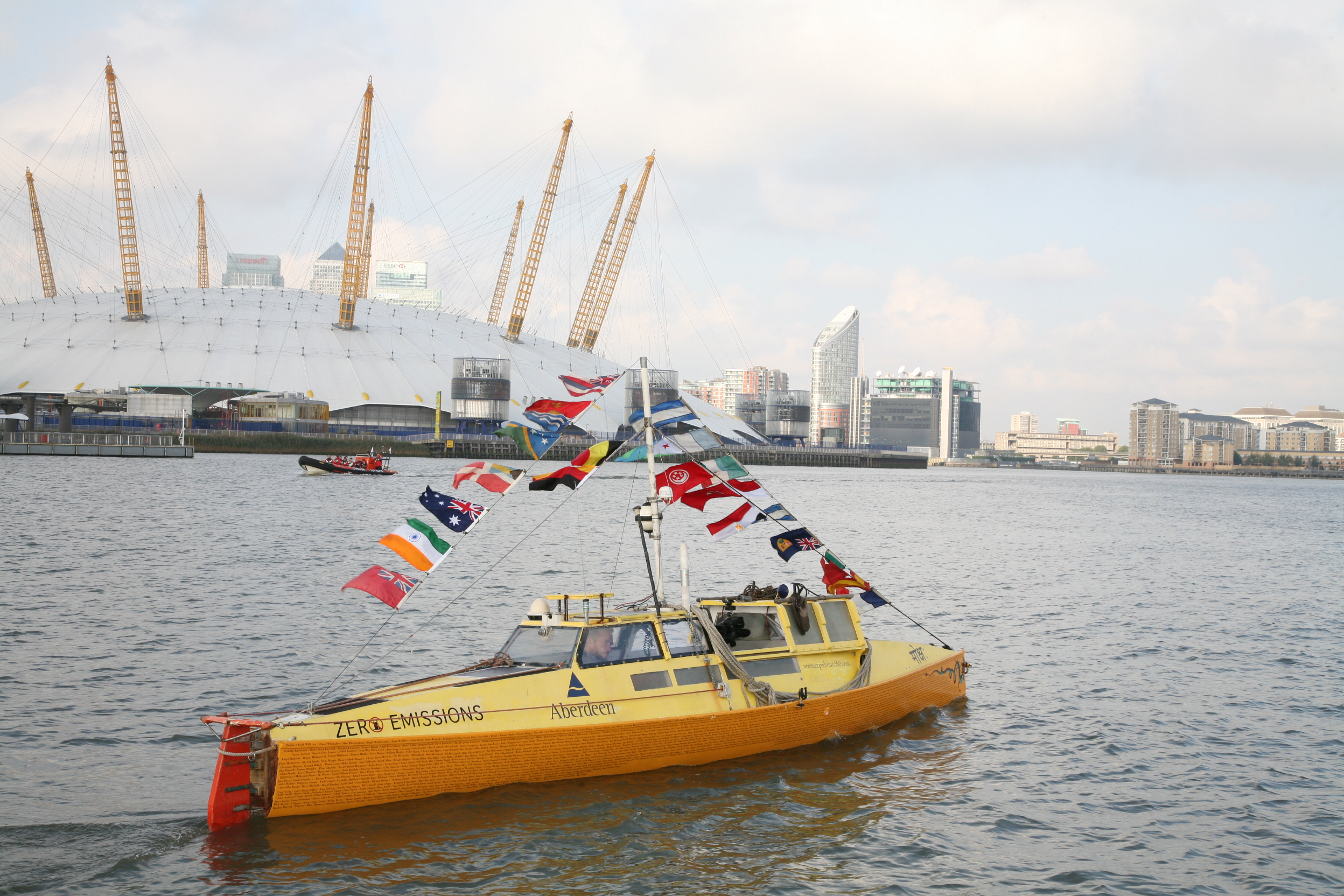
Lewis of pedalling his boat Moksha on the River Thames in London, shortly before completing the first human-powered circumnavigation of the Earth (2007)

The second half of Jason's human powered circumnavigation journey continued through Southeast Asia and India before crossing the Arabian Sea to the African shores, from where he aimed north toward the Middle East and Europe, eventually returning to his starting point in England.

During his expedition, Lewis twice survived malaria, septicaemia, a bout of mild schizophrenia, and a crocodile attack near Australia in 2005.

== See also ==
- Colin Angus (explorer)
- Julie Wafaei
