= Kacie Fischer =

American inline skater

Kacie Fischer Cleveland is the fastest woman to inline skate across the United States, a feat she accomplished in 2012. She is the fastest person to ever do so, skating from California to Florida in 47 days; the previous official record was 69 days, by Rusty Montcrief in 2002. Danny Dannels reportedly did it in 67 days, but that is unofficial. Fischer skated to raise money for the Special Olympics. In addition to skating, Fischer is a personal trainer, CrossFit Coach, fitness lead at Inline Warehouse, and professional tower runner (someone who races up stairwells of skyscrapers). She and Adam Cleveland, who was then her fiancé, started the nonprofit organization LiveGiveSkate.org. While at college she suffered from heart failure, which prompted her to begin a vigorous athletic regimen.
