= Erden Eruç =

Turkish adventurer (born 1961)

- Born: 14 July 1961 (age 65); Nicosia, Cyprus
- Education: Boğaziçi University (B.S. and M.S. in Mechanical Engineering); Ohio State University (M.S. in Engineering Mechanics); George Mason University (M.B.A.)
- Occupations: Consultant; circumnavigator; founder, president and Chief Exploration Officer of Around-n-Over
- Years active: 1994–present
- Known for: First solo human-powered circumnavigation and several ocean rowing world records
- Spouse: Nancy Board (m. 2003)
- Website: www.erdeneruc.com

Erden Eruç (Turkish pronunciation: [æɾˈdæn eˈɾutʃ]; born 14 July 1961) is a Turkish-American adventurer who became the first person in history to complete an entirely solo and entirely human-powered circumnavigation of the Earth on 21 July 2012 in Bodega Bay, California, United States. The journey had started from Bodega Bay a little more than five years earlier on 10 July 2007. The modes of transport included a rowboat to cross the oceans, a sea kayak for shorelines, a bicycle on the roads and hiking on trails, along with canoes for a few river crossings. The route he followed was 66,299 km (41,196 mi) long, crossed the equator twice and all lines of longitude, and passed over twelve pairs of antipodal points, meeting all the requirements for a true circumnavigation of the globe. Guinness World Records has officially recognized Eruç for the "First solo circumnavigation of the globe using human power" on a journey that lasted 5 years 11 days 12 hours and 22 minutes.

Eruç's human-powered circumnavigation plan was expanded to include summitting the tallest mountains on six continents as a tribute to his friend and fellow adventurer Göran Kropp who died in 2002 while climbing with Eruç in Vantage, Washington. Eruç named his expedition the Six Summits Project. So far he has summited three of the peaks including Denali (also known as Mount McKinley) in North America on 29 May 2003 more than four years before he began his solo circumnavigation, then Mount Kosciuszko in Australia on 10 April 2010, and Mount Kilimanjaro in Africa on 14 June 2011 during the circumnavigation.

By the end of his circumnavigation, Eruç had set several ocean rowing world records including the first person to row three oceans, the first rower to cross the Indian Ocean from Australia to mainland Africa (in two segments), the longest distance rowed across the Indian Ocean, and the longest distance rowed across the Atlantic Ocean.

== Early life ==
External media

Images
- On Mount McKinley (© 2003 Around-n-Over)
- With bicycle (© 2003 Around-n-Over)

Video
- Rotating globe with route (by KPLU-FM, Seattle/Tacoma)

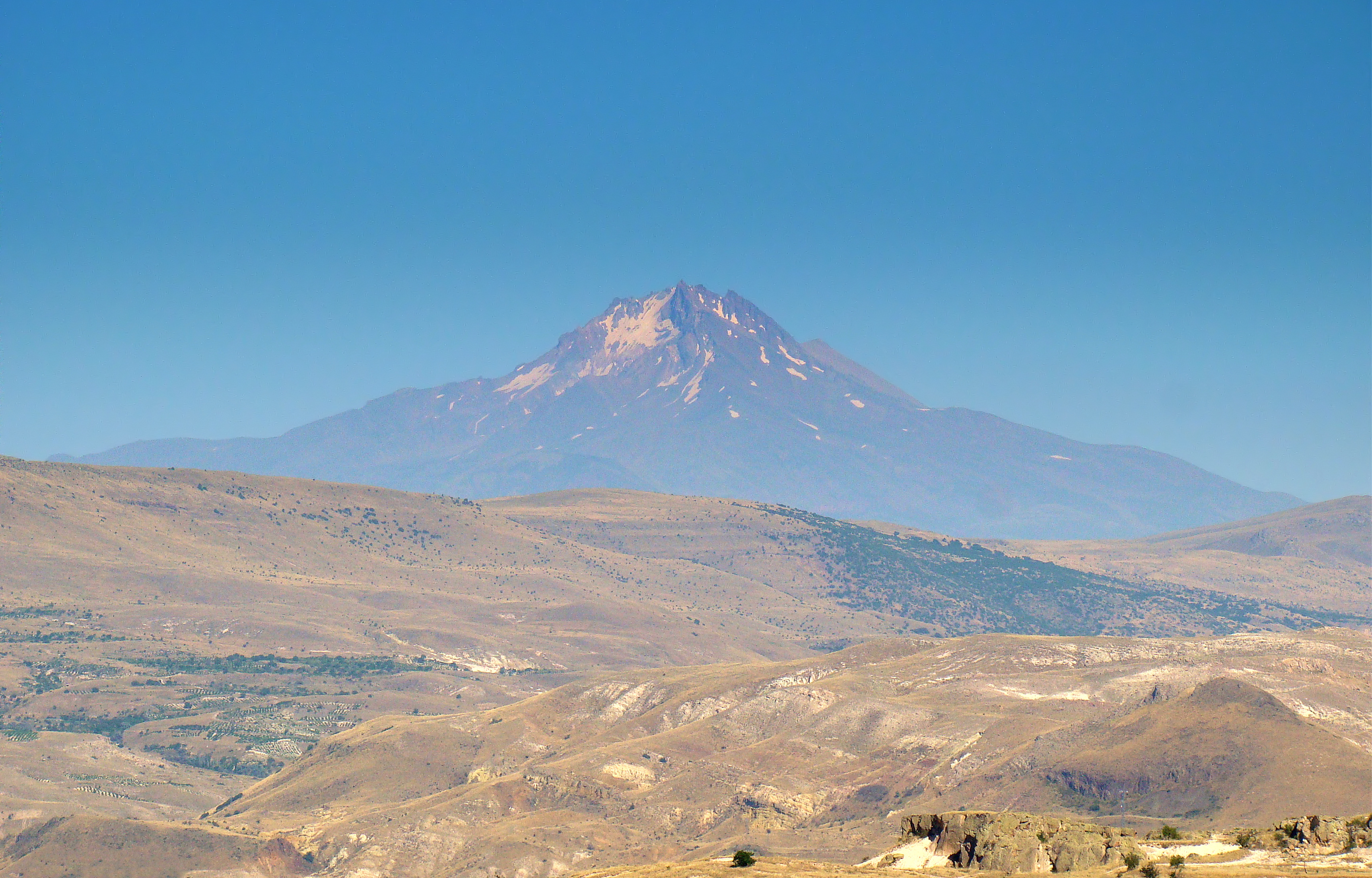
Mount Erciyes in the Cappadocia region of Turkey

Eruç was born Nicosia, Cyprus, on 14 July 1961, and raised in Turkey. He has been an avid outdoorsman from an early age. When he was 11, his father took him for a climbing trip to Mount Erciyes, an extinct stratovolcano in south central Turkey and the highest mountain in central Anatolia with a summit at 3,916 m (12,848 ft). In 1977, Eruç was a student in Brussels, Belgium. Eruç studied mechanical engineering at Boğaziçi University in Istanbul where he earned both a Bachelor of Science degree and a Master of Science degree. In 1986, he moved to the United States where he continued his studies in engineering and business administration, earning a second Master of Science degree in Engineering Mechanics at Ohio State University and an MBA degree at George Mason University.

Eruç worked in various technical consulting projects in the U.S. for nine years, advancing into project management. He left the corporate office world at age 41, allowing him all the time he needed to pursue outdoor adventures, with the intent of inspiring others, especially children, through the pursuit of human-powered travels.

During a bicycle trip to Alaska to climb Mount McKinley in June 2003, Eruç married Nancy Board in a native Alaskan Haida-Tsimshian ceremony on a beach near Homer, Alaska.

== Nonprofit organization ==
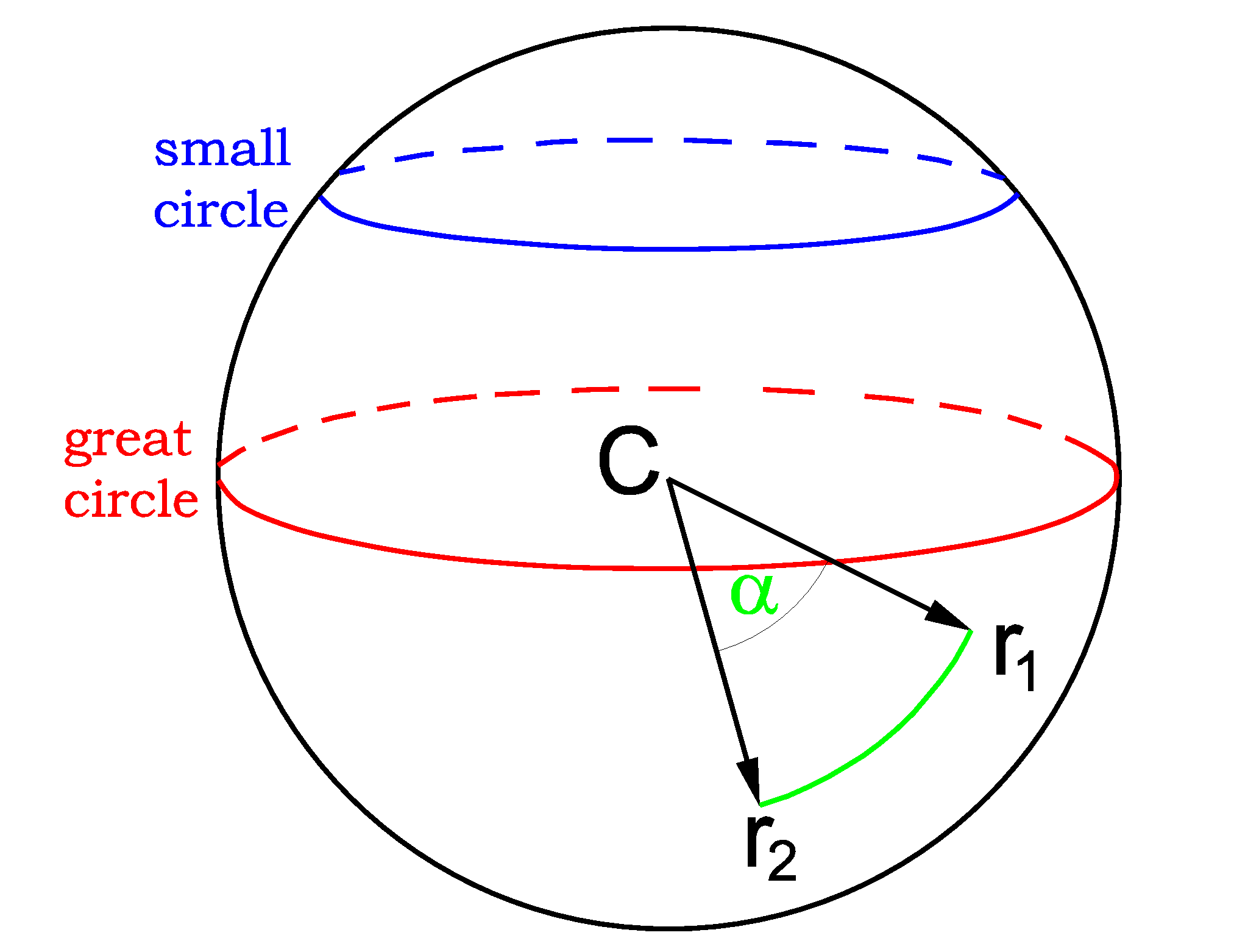
A great circle drawn on a sphere. All other circles drawn around a sphere will have a smaller circumference than a great circle. An arc (green line) drawn directly between any two points r_{1} and r_{2} on the surface of a sphere is part of a great circle that is formed by extending the arc completely around the sphere.

In December 2002, Eruç established a 501(c)(3) nonprofit organization called Around-n-Over based in Seattle which received IRS approval as a 501(c)(3) nonprofit entity in 2003. The Around-n-Over organization's mission is to accomplish human-powered expeditions that inspire and teach, so that others may achieve success in their own endeavors.

The organization was also formed to honor fellow adventurers who had lost their lives, especially Göran Kropp who fell and died while climbing with Eruç in September 2002. Additionally, Around-n-Over provides the necessary structure for handling funds for expedition expenses and charitable donations to other organizations. The Turkish İLKYAR Foundation is one such charity, which provides assistance to Turkish elementary and middle school children in rural parts of the country, while the Mateves Secondary School near Mount Kilimanjaro is also being assisted by funds donated to Around-n-Over.

The organization's name is based on Eruç's plan of circumnavigating (going around an approximate great circle of) the Earth using only his own power and (-n-) also summiting (going over) the highest peaks on each of the continents, excepting only Antarctica.

== The rowboat ==
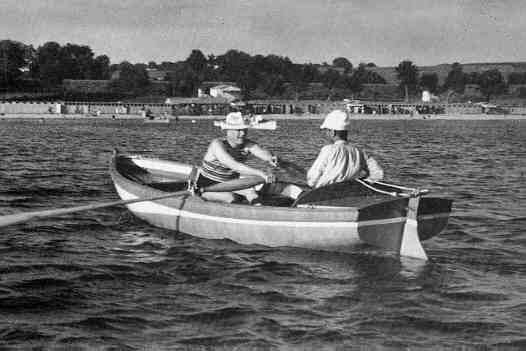
A common rowboat is much smaller and less durable than those used for rowing across oceans.

External image
- Rowboat and bike (© 2003 Around-n-Over)

In September 2004, Eruç committed to purchasing a used and proven 7.1 m (23.3 ft) by 1.9 m (6.2 ft) oceangoing plywood rowboat, the same vessel which he would eventually row across three oceans to reach two more summits in his Six Summits Project. The rowboat was christened Kaos by its first owners and was later renamed Calderdale – the Yorkshire Challenger, or simply the Calderdale, by its second owners. Before Eruç acquired it, the Calderdale had already successfully crossed the Atlantic Ocean twice with two-person teams aboard. The boat is listed as the Around-n-Over on the website of Guinness World Records. Eruç has not officially renamed the boat and still refers to it as the Calderdale. He has stated that the naming rights to the rowboat are available to a willing sponsor.

The 250 kg (550 lb) bare and 750 kg (1,650 lb) loaded rowboat was equipped with many advanced navigational, safety and communications systems, powered by a pair of 12 volt gel batteries and a solar panel. The loaded rowboat contained an Argos tracking beacon, an EPIRB distress beacon, satellite phone, GPS navigator, radar transponder, radar reflector, VHF radio, palm-size computer, one manually operated and two powered desalination units, a medical kit, a watertight cabin and a life raft with an emergency bag of supplies.

When not in active use, the rowboat has been housed at the Foss Waterway Seaport's Working Waterfront Maritime Museum in Tacoma, Washington.

== Initial journeys ==
Prior to his successful circumnavigation of 2007 to 2012, Eruç had developed a substantially different route plan. This initial plan still began with his roundtrip bicycle ride from Seattle to Mount McKinley in Alaska from 1 February to 24 August 2003 with the summit being reached on 29 May.

Eruç had planned to row south from Seattle to South America to continue the project with a climb of Aconcagua. On 3 October 2004, however, Eruç once again left Seattle riding his fully loaded bicycle and arrived in Miami on 25 December. He had selected Miami as a new and potentially better starting point for a circumnavigation attempt combined with the summits project. The plan at that time was to row from Miami through the Caribbean Sea and then the Panama Canal to the Pacific, row down the west coast of South America, bike to and climb Aconcagua, row to New Guinea, bike to and climb Carstensz Pyramid (an alternate to Kosciuszko for the highest peak in Oceania), row to the Asian mainland, bike to and climb Everest, row to Africa, bike to and climb Kilimanjaro, row to the Middle East, bike to and climb Elbrus, and finally row the Mediterranean Sea and Atlantic Ocean back to Miami.

A change in plans occurred when Eruç learned about Tim Harvey, a fellow human-powered adventurer, and Harvey's desire for a way home to Vancouver, Canada from Europe. Eruç contacted Harvey and had the Calderdale shipped to Portugal. The two men began rowing from Lisbon on 16 October 2005 intending to cross the entire Atlantic Ocean together; however, conditions prevented them from rowing away from Las Palmas de Gran Canaria after their arrival on 11 December. Harvey decided to go ahead with another group travelling by sailboat, thereby ending the human-powered part of his expedition but remaining emission-free since no motor was used. By late 2005, Eruç had considered making the entire journey a two-person rowing circumnavigation and consequently had started sending out requests for new rowing partners and sponsors. He eventually continued on alone and completed his first solo Atlantic row starting from Las Palmas on 29 January and finishing in Guadeloupe on 5 May 2006. The idea of a circumnavigation by rowboat was nearly abandoned when sponsorships and partners failed to materialize. Early in 2007, however, the Aktaş Group, a Turkish transportation and construction holding company, came forward as a principal sponsor and a new solo circumnavigation plan was set in motion.

== First solo human-powered circumnavigation ==
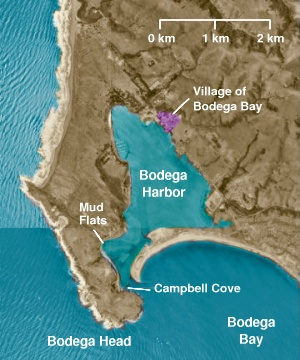
Map of Bodega Bay, California

In early May 2007, Eruç once again departed Seattle this time riding his bicycle to Tiburon, California on the north side of San Francisco Bay. After fighting very strong onshore winds while trying to row out of San Francisco Bay in early and mid-June, he departed instead from Bodega Bay, California on 10 July 2007. Eruç had bicycled from Tiburon to Bodega Bay while his rowboat was transported separately to the new starting point, as it was during all later segments of the journey. The intended destination for his first arrival port was Mooloolaba, which is located just north of Brisbane in Australia, after crossing the immensity of the Pacific Ocean. Eruç calculated that the straight-line distance was 6,182 nautical miles (11,400 km; 7,110 mi) while rowing in the middle of the ocean, based on distances from his boat to both shores. Due to opposing winds and ocean currents during rest periods, the actual distance rowed would be longer.

=== Pacific Ocean to Papua New Guinea ===
The rowboat proved very capable in rough seas and was only capsized once in crossing three oceans. On 20 December 2007 in the middle of the Pacific Ocean, a large rogue wave tipped the boat about 120 to 150 degrees in the estimation of Eruç. The wave hit while he was asleep in the cabin and threw him to the ceiling and then back to the floor as the boat righted itself due to its ballast. The only losses of any value from the open deck were energy gels and fluid replacement packets, with all other valuables being either tied down or stowed securely.

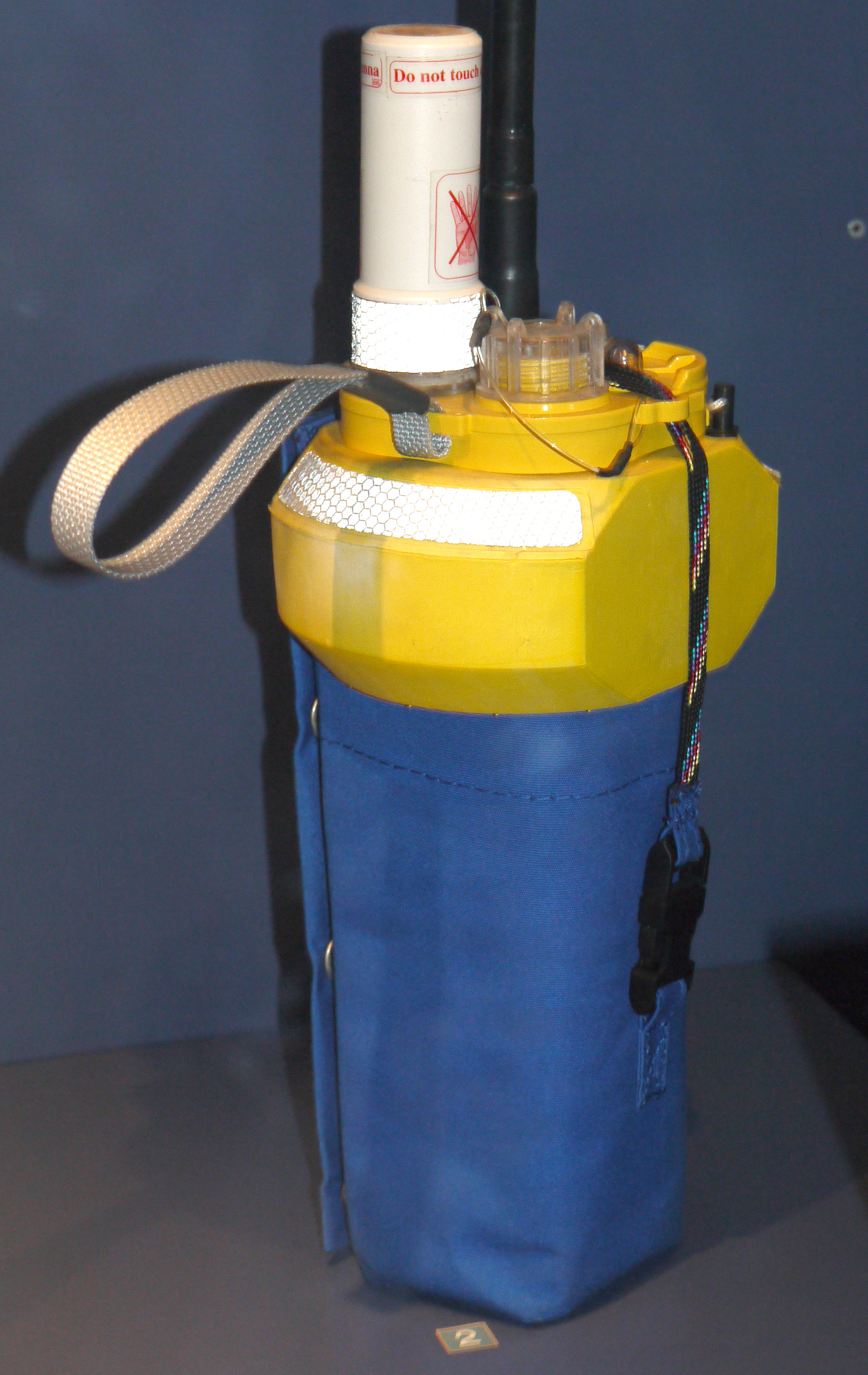
An Argos beacon

On 10 January 2008, an emergency signal was received from Eruç's Argos tracking beacon. A search and rescue operation was almost started when a call from Eruç was received indicating it was a false alarm.

Unusually strong currents in the middle and western Pacific made progress south very difficult for Eruç. After his launch from Bodega Bay, La Niña conditions had developed on the Pacific. He was ultimately unable to cross the equator on his first attempt due to the opposing currents and wind patterns in the Intertropical Convergence Zone. Running dangerously low on food supplies after fighting strong La Niña winds from the southeast in the early part of the main typhoon season, Eruç was effectively trapped in the northern hemisphere. He accepted assistance from Filipino fishermen of the Frabelle Fishing Corporation north of Papua New Guinea (PNG) on 17 May 2008. The first typhoon of that season had formed on 5 May due northwest of him and would turn into a Category-4 super typhoon named Rammasun. He had reached the PNG waters near Ninigo Islands before the winds carried him offshore.

Eight months later on 15 January 2009, after the typhoon season had ended, the same fishermen returned him to the exact location where they had found him. Continuing on the Bismarck Sea, Eruç crossed the equator and reached Finsch Harbor in PNG on 4 February. At this point, he took another break of nearly eight months to mend his injured back. Beginning on 22 September 2009 he continued on foot and by sea kayak along the Solomon Sea shores of PNG and then walked shore-to-shore from Oro Bay to Port Moresby over the historic Kokoda Track until 26 November 2009.

=== Australia and Mount Kosciuszko ===
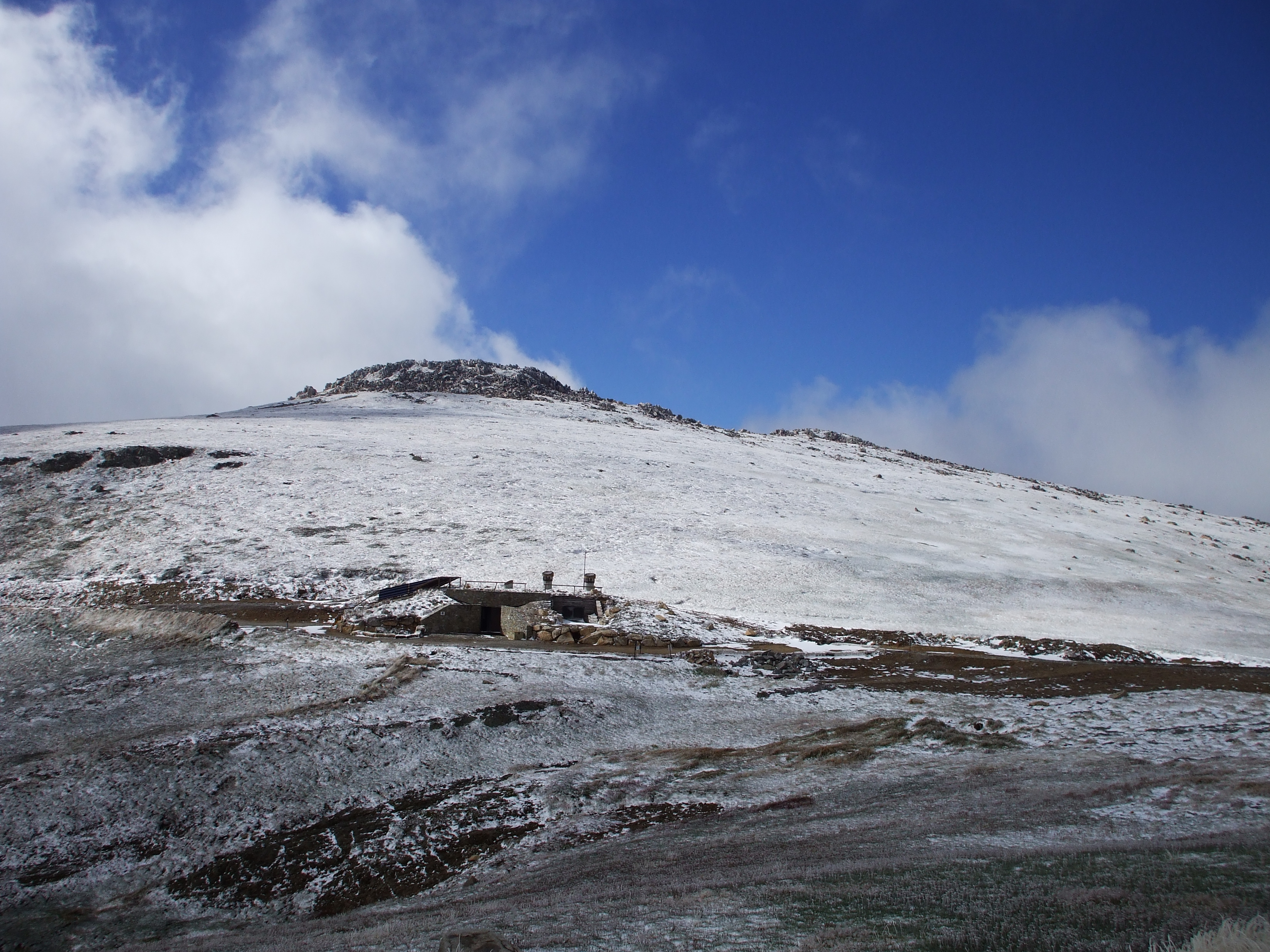
Mount Kosciuszko

Departing from Port Moresby on 8 December 2009, Eruç rowed his boat—which had been shipped around PNG for him—across the Coral Sea and reached the Cape York Peninsula, Australia on 10 January 2010. He sea kayaked down the coast from 28 January to 15 February 2010 until he reached Cooktown where he continued by bicycle on 18 February. Eruç bicycled along the east coast toward Mount Kosciuszko, the second peak of his Six Summits Project, which he summited on 10 April. He continued again by bicycle along the southern and western coastal areas of the country. After preparing and resupplying his rowboat in Perth through that June, Eruç had the rowboat shipped north to Carnarvon as a more favorable departure point. He bicycled to Carnarvon and arrived on 7 July 2010.

=== Indian Ocean, Africa and Mount Kilimanjaro ===
Eruç departed from Carnarvon on 13 July 2010 to cross the Indian Ocean to Africa. After three and a half months of solitary rowing, a frigate named TCG Gaziantep of the Turkish Navy rendezvoused with Eruç north of Madagascar on 30 October. Coincidentally, the frigate was named after the Turkish city where Eruç's mother had been raised, though she was born in nearby Kilis. After exchanging pleasantries and gifts via a small zodiac boat, the frigate continued escorting Eruç as he rowed westward until sunset that day. The area was being patrolled as part of a Combined Task Force to combat piracy and the commander of that task force, Rear Admiral Sinan Ertuğrul, was on the frigate. Ertuğrul and Eruç had been exchanging emails about his route and expected landfall in Africa, and were attempting to steer him clear of pirate activity.

In November 2010 as the cyclone season was starting, Eruç found that he could not continue toward the African coast because a mesoscale eddy, or vortex, had formed around him and was pushing him away from the coast. He witnessed waterspouts while rowing in the Mozambique Channel and changed direction to the south-southeast reaching Mahajanga in Madagascar on 26 November without encountering any pirates. The row from Australia to Madagascar had taken about four and a half months. Eruç took a four-month break until the cyclone season ended before rowing westward to the African coast from Mahajanga on 26 March 2011 making landfall at Angoche in Mozambique on 20 April.

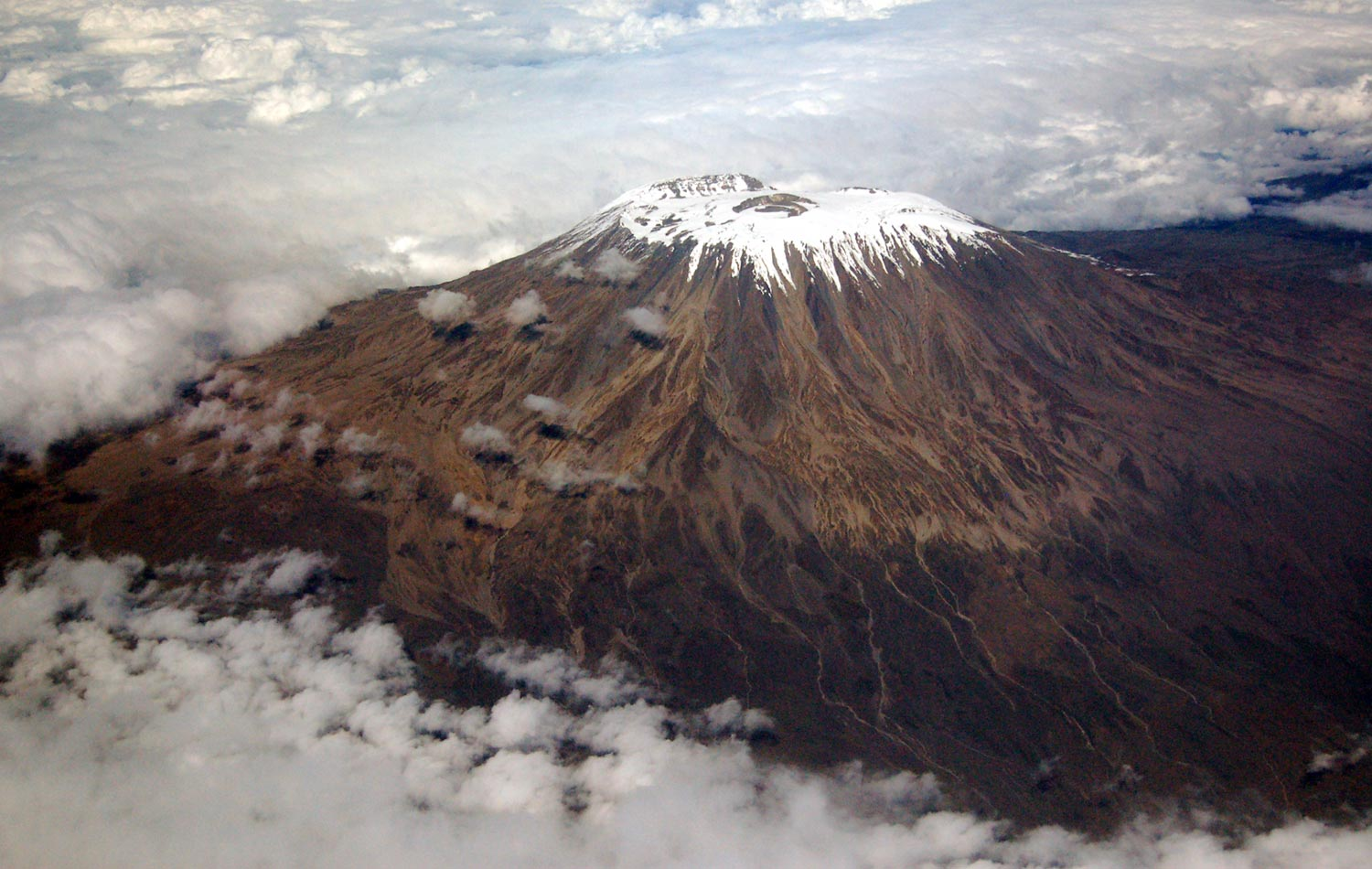
Mount Kilimanjaro

Eruç began bicycling across the continent twelve days later on 2 May with a side excursion to prepare for and climb Mount Kilimanjaro in Tanzania, the third peak of his Six Summits Project, from 8 to 15 June 2011. His climbing party of more than a dozen people, including his wife and his 78-year-old father Cemal Eruç, summited the mountain on 14 June.

While bicycling in northern Mozambique, Eruç had crashed his bicycle several times on an unexpectedly sandy road. On 26 June 2011, Eruç crashed over rumble strips in Kabuku, Tanzania while avoiding a passing bus. His bicycle was not damaged but his GPS unit and Argos beacon were broken, his left thumb was hyperextended, and his right hip and right forearm had hit the pavement hard. After treating the wounds and taping his swollen thumb to his forefinger, Eruç continued southwestward through Zambia and Namibia. By 21 August he had reached the west coast of Africa. His rowboat had been transported, and then prepped and resupplied during a seven-week break. He departed from Lüderitz, Namibia on 10 October 2011.

=== Atlantic Ocean and the Americas ===
The crossing of the Atlantic Ocean to South America lasted about five months until 11 March 2012 when Eruç reached Güiria, Venezuela. To reach a more favorable departure point for rowing, he completed a relatively short bicycle trip of 138 km (86 mi) along the coast of Venezuela to Carúpano on 19 March. His rowboat had been moved to the port of Carúpano so he could continue from there. The final rowing segment was across the Caribbean Sea and the Gulf of Mexico to Cameron, Louisiana in the United States from 21 March to 27 May 2012. The final segment overall was a bicycle ride starting on 21 June and ending on 21 July 2012 at the same pier where he had started, in Bodega Bay, California.

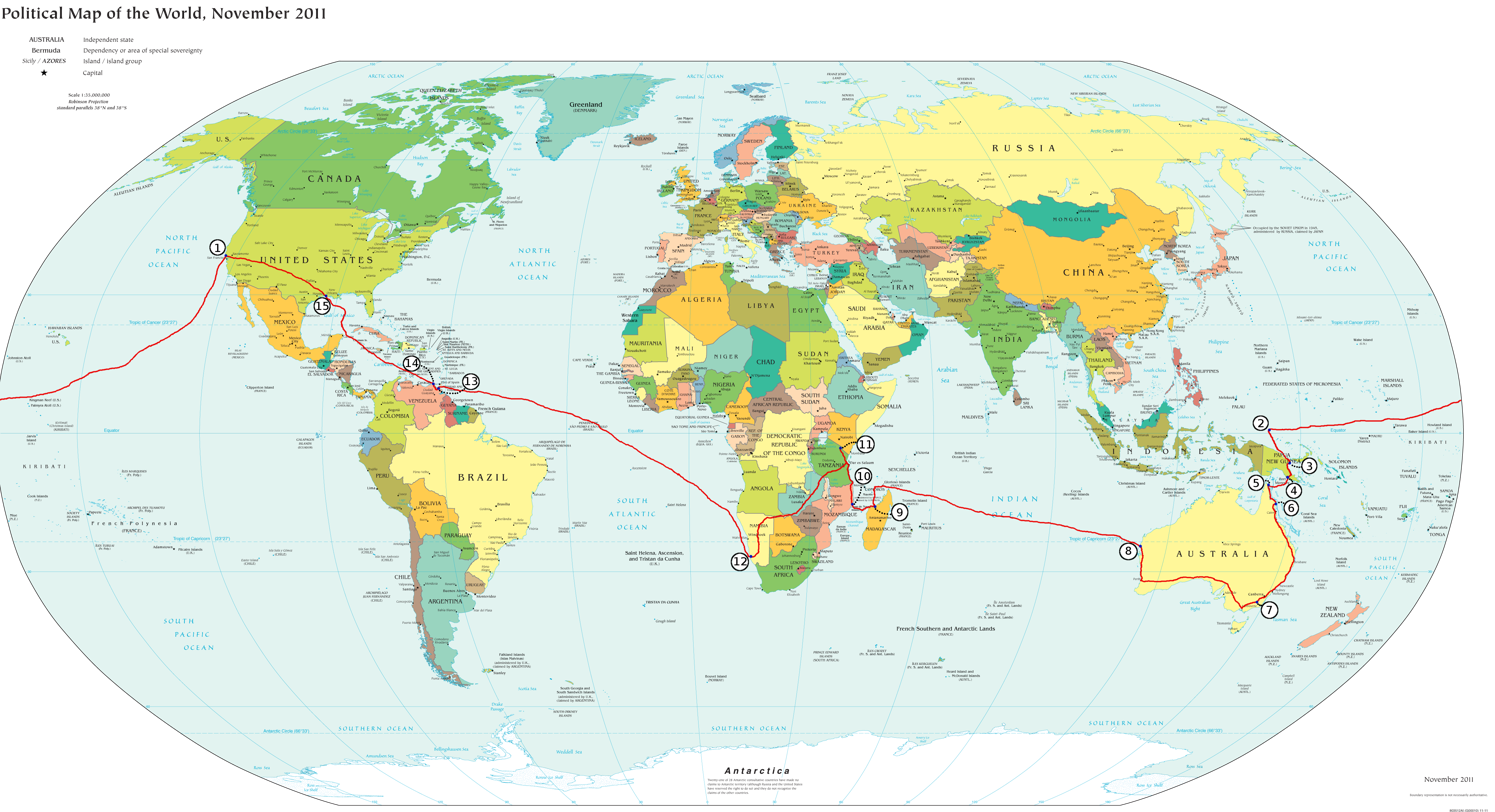
The approximate route with major waypoints numbered (text annotations in the Wikimedia page)

=== Summary ===
Eruç logged 66,299 km (41,196 mi) while rowing across three oceans—the Pacific, Indian and Atlantic—and cycling across three continents—Australia, Africa and North America. He became the first person to solo circumnavigate the globe entirely on his own power. He crossed the equator two times, passed over twelve pairs of antipodal points and spent five years and eleven days of his life completing the endeavor—the world record time for a human-powered circumnavigation. The total elapsed time of over five years included several long periods of downtime spent away from the route, for a total of about 26 months, with Eruç always continuing again from the exact location where he had last stopped. (Note: Human powered circumnavigators sometimes deviate from their track...[which] is accepted custom by these adventurers as long as the explorer returns to the point where he last stopped and continues the trip from there.) Excluding the downtime periods, he had traveled a total of 1026 days, or about two years and ten months.

The remaining three mountains of the Six Summits Project—Everest, Elbrus and Aconcagua—were skipped during the circumnavigation primarily due to a lower level of donations than was anticipated which led to budgetary constraints and the decision to shorten the route. Eruç's decision to bypass those mountains resulted in a route that more closely followed a great circle route than the one he had originally envisioned.

To finance the expedition, Eruç and his wife had sold condominium properties in Washington, D.C. and Seattle, as well as a second car, and moved into a rental property. Eruç also withdrew the funds from his 401k retirement plan. The total spent out of the couple's own assets was approximately $216,000. Their organization's sponsors and donors contributed a similar amount in cash and products, including his bicycle, bike trailer and panniers, a liferaft, desalinating watermakers, energy bars and freeze dried foods.

"A half-million-dollar project is what this turned out to be." — Erden Eruç

Eruç maintained a blog of his adventure by posting dispatches on his website every few days. He was able to communicate directly with family, friends and schoolchildren in their classrooms, as well as medical and scientific experts, via a satellite phone link with email capability. Occasional technical problems caused Eruç to record audio dispatches while in the Mozambique Channel and the Gulf of Mexico.

== Awards ==
Some of the awards Eruç has received include:

- 2010 Vancouver Award and 2013 Citation of Merit—The Explorers Club
- 2013 Adventurers of the Year—Outside (magazine)
- 2016 Great Pacific Race—1st place in the classic pairs class of rowboats

== Records ==
=== Guinness World Records ===
As of 2020, Eruç has set the following Guinness World Records:

- First solo (Note: Eruç always rowed completely alone and moved his own body using only his own power. The first individual to complete an entirely human-powered circumnavigation was Jason Lewis. Over a 13 year period from 1994 to 2007, Lewis had other people's assistance several times in a two-person pedal boat which allowed one to rest while the other continued pedaling. Stevie Smith, Chris Tipper, April Abril, Lourdes Arango and Sher Dhillon all share credit with Lewis for the various ocean crossings in the pedal boat.) circumnavigation of the globe using human power
- Fastest circumnavigation of the globe by human power—5 years, 11 days, 12 hours, and 22 minutes
- First to row all three major oceans—Pacific, Indian and Atlantic
- Greatest distance rowed solo on the ocean—23,473 nautical miles (43,472 km; 27,012 mi) (total distance includes all segments of the solo circumnavigation and the solo Atlantic Ocean crossing of 2006)
- Longest solo row across an ocean—312 days, 2 hours across the Pacific Ocean from Bodega Bay, California to Papua New Guinea
- Most days at sea by a solo male ocean rower—844 days (total days includes all segments of the solo circumnavigation and the solo Atlantic Ocean crossing of 2006)

==== Indian Ocean records ====
- First row across the Indian Ocean from mainland Australia to mainland Africa
- Greatest distance rowed on the Indian Ocean—5,667 nautical miles (10,495 km; 6,521 mi) from mainland Australia to Madagascar and across the Mozambique Channel to mainland Africa
- Greatest distance rowed solo on the Indian Ocean—5,086 nautical miles (9,419 km; 5,853 mi) from Australia to Madagascar
- Greatest distance rowed non-stop on the Indian Ocean—5,086 nautical miles (9,419 km; 5,853 mi) from Australia to Madagascar

==== Atlantic Ocean records ====
- Greatest distance rowed on the Atlantic Ocean—7,065 nautical miles (13,084 km; 8,130 mi) from Namibia to Venezuela and across the Caribbean Sea to the United States
- Farthest distance rowed solo and non-stop on the Atlantic Ocean—5,029 nautical miles (9,314 km; 5,787 mi) from Namibia to Venezuela in 153 days, 11 hours, and 52 minutes
- Longest non-stop distance rowed across the Atlantic Ocean—5,030 nautical miles (9,320 km; 5,790 mi)

==== Caribbean Sea records ====
- Greatest distance rowed solo on the Caribbean sea—1,458 nautical miles (2,700 km; 1,678 mi) from Venezuela to the Yucatán Channel, 22 March to 3 May 2012
- First non-stop row across the Caribbean Sea and the Gulf of Mexico—2,589 nautical miles (4,795 km; 2,979 mi) from Venezuela to Louisiana, 22 March to 27 May 2012

=== 2016 Great Pacific Race ===
Eruç rowed with Louis Bird, the son of Peter Bird, as a substitute for a race partner who had withdrawn for health reasons. They set the fastest time in the classic pair class to row mid-Pacific east-to-west in the Great Pacific Race, from Monterey Bay, California to Waikiki, Hawaii, in 54 days, 3 hours and 45 minutes, finishing first among three boats in the same class. The race result is also a Guinness World Record.

== See also ==
- Jason Lewis
- Mixed transportation circumnavigations
