= Jason Lewis (adventurer) =

English author and sustainability advocate

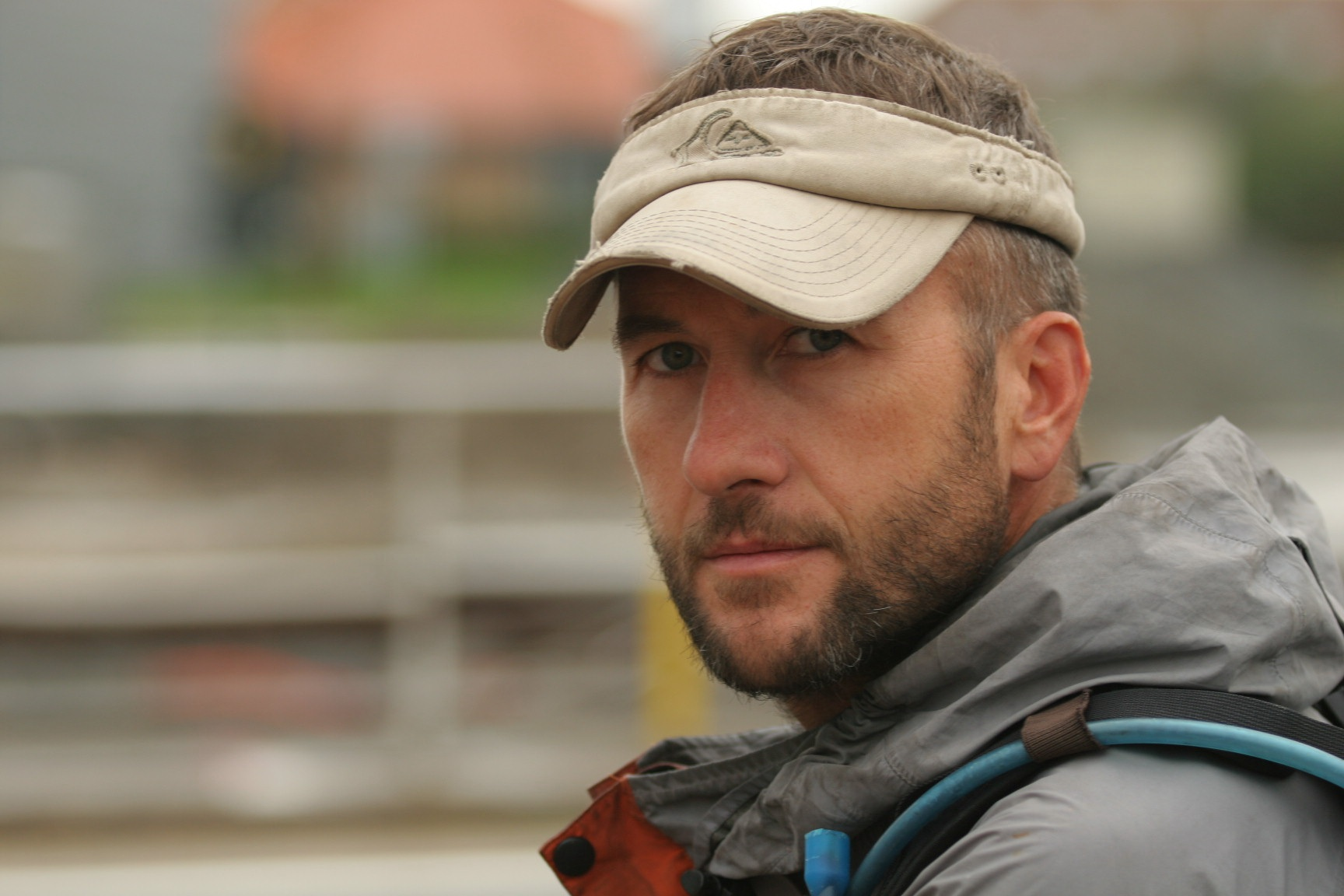
- Born: 13 September 1967 (age 58); Catterick, Yorkshire, England, UK
- Occupations: Explorer, author, speaker
- Website: explorerjason.com

Jason Lewis FRGS (born 13 September 1967) is an English author, explorer and sustainability campaigner credited with being the first person to circumnavigate the globe by human power. He is also the first person to cross North America on inline skates (1996), and the first to cross the Pacific Ocean by pedal power (2000). Together with Stevie Smith, Lewis completed the first crossing of the Atlantic Ocean from mainland Europe to North America by human power (1995).

== Expedition 360 ==
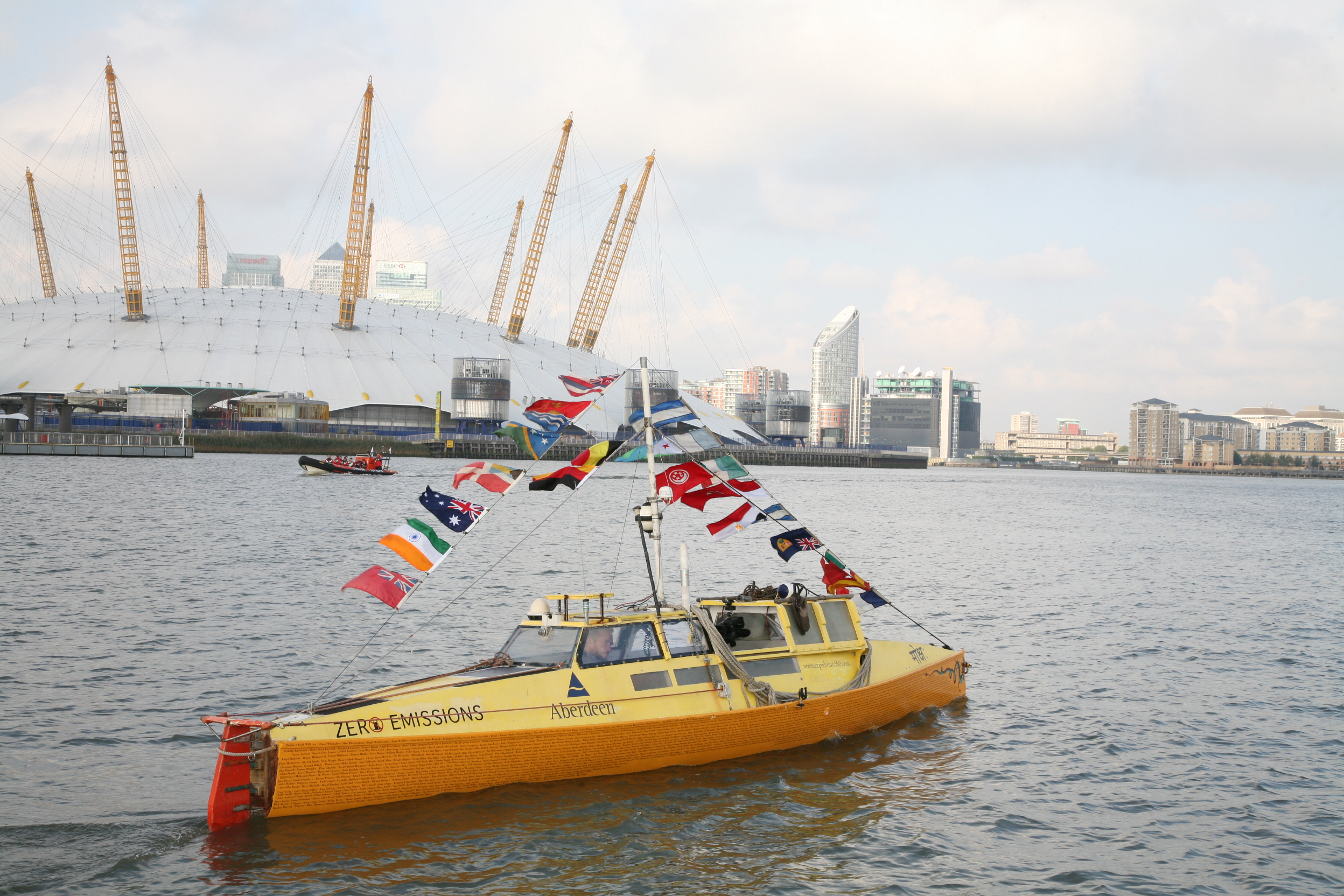
Lewis pedalling his boat Moksha on the River Thames in London, shortly before completing the first human-powered circumnavigation of the Earth (2007)

Lewis set off with friend and fellow adventurer Stevie Smith from Greenwich, London on 12 July 1994, to complete the world's first human-powered circumnavigation, and the two dubbed the journey Expedition 360. By July 2007, Lewis had travelled over 60,000 km (37,000 mi). He successfully ended his 4,833-day expedition on 6 October 2007, having travelled 74,842 km (46,505 mi).

In mid-1994, Lewis and Smith mountain-biked 2,700 kilometres (1,700 mi) through France, Spain and Portugal to the port of Lagos, Portugal. Departing on 13 October 1994, Lewis and Smith then pedaled 111 consecutive days and 7,200 kilometres (4,500 mi) across the Atlantic Ocean from Portugal to Miami, Florida in a wooden pedal-powered boat named Moksha.

Lewis then rollerbladed thousands of miles across North America. He was struck by a drunk driver in Pueblo, Colorado, and spent nine months recovering from two broken legs. He finished the North American expedition leg in 1996. In 1998 and 1999, Lewis and Smith spent 53 days pedaling Moksha across the Pacific Ocean from San Francisco, California to Hilo, Hawaii, where Smith ended his journey. In four days, Lewis and a small group of supporters hiked the 80 miles across Hawaii.

After 73 days of solo pedaling Moksha across the doldrums, Lewis completed the Pacific Ocean crossing from Hawaii to the island atoll of Tarawa. In May 2000, he was accompanied by Moksha's builder, Chris Tipper, to pedal the 1,300-mile stretch from Tarawa to the Solomon Islands. With the help of friend and expedition supporter April Abril, Lewis then pedaled Moksha 1,450 miles for 32 days across the Coral Sea to Australia. In 2001, Lewis and a group of supporters spent 88 days cycling 3,500 miles across the Australian outback, starting near Cooktown, Queensland, and finishing in the port city of Darwin, Northern Territory.

After spending many years raising funds to continue Expedition 360, Lewis was reunited with Moksha in 2005. He and expedition supporter Lourdes Arango pedaled 450 nautical miles from Darwin to Dili, East Timor.

Throughout 2005, Lewis kayaked thousands of miles through the Indonesian archipelago from East Timor to Singapore. In 2006, he biked from Singapore to the Himalayas, and biked and hiked through the Himalayas to the port of Mumbai. Covering 2,000 nautical miles in 46 days during early 2007, Lewis and friend Sher Dhillon pedaled Moksha from Mumbai, India, crossing the Arabian Sea to Djibouti.

Lewis then planned to travel through Ethiopia, Sudan, Egypt, and the Middle East before reaching Europe – encountering a problem at the Sudan-Egypt border. The Egyptian authorities would not let him pass through their waters, and when his visa for Sudan ran out he was left with an "impossible decision". He attempted to kayak across Lake Nasser to Abu Simbel but was arrested on suspicion of spying. He was released, but Egyptian authorities forbade him from cycling the 178-mile journey to Aswan. He completed this section illegally by riding partly at night. During his journey through Sudan he encountered actors Ewan McGregor and Charley Boorman who were travelling south as part of their Long Way Down motorbike trip.

In July 2007, Lewis reached Syria, and then cycled across Turkey, Bulgaria, Romania, Austria, Germany, and Belgium before returning to London on 6 October. Pulling Moksha in tow, Lewis crossed the Greenwich Meridian Line where he had begun his expedition 13 years earlier.

During his expedition, Lewis twice survived malaria, sepsis, a bout of mild schizophrenia, and a crocodile attack near Australia in 2005.

As part of a wider interest in sustainability and education, Lewis has visited more than 900 schools in 37 countries, giving talks to students and involving them in a variety of programs to promote world citizenship, zero carbon emission travel, and awareness of consumption habits on the health of the planet.

In August 2020, Lewis announced on his blog that he and Stevens would embark on a three-year journey named GB360, circumnavigating United Kingdom and Ireland with refitted Moksha, bike and kayak, documenting examples of sustainable living along the way. They began the first leg of their trip, Cymru360 circumnavigating Wales, from Deeside on 19 June 2021, covering 650 miles in 8 weeks, and ending on 12 August. After completion, Lewis tweeted that if funding permits, they plan to circumnavigate Scotland or Ireland in 2022.

== Bibliography ==
- The Expedition, Dark Waters: True Story of the First Human-Powered Circumnavigation of the Earth, Billy Fish Books 2012
- The Expedition, The Seed Buried Deep, Billy Fish Books, 2013
- The Expedition, To the Brink, Billy Fish Books, 2014
- Contributor to Chicken Soup for the Traveler's Soul, HCI, 2002
- Contributor to Flightless: Incredible Journeys Without Leaving the Ground, Lonely Planet Publications, 2008
- Contributor to The Modern Explorers, Thames & Hudson, 2013
- Smith, Stevie, Pedalling to Hawaii, Summersdale Publishers Ltd., 2005

== Records ==
- Recognized by Guinness World Records as the first individual human-powered circumnavigation of the Earth, 2013.
- Teamed with Stevie Smith, Lewis was the first to cross the Atlantic Ocean from mainland Europe to North America by human power, February 1995.
- First person to cross North America on inline skates, September 1996.
- First person to cross the Pacific Ocean by pedal power, August 2000.

== Literary Awards ==
- The Expedition, Dark Waters: True Story of the First Human-Powered Circumnavigation of Earth and BillyFish Books awarded the Independent Book Publishers Association Benjamin Franklin Bill Fisher Award for best first book (non-fiction), 2013
- Winner of the 2013 Eric Hoffer (First Horizon) Award for The Expedition, Dark Waters: True Story of the First Human-Powered Circumnavigation of Earth
- Winner of the 2013 National Indie Excellence Award for The Expedition, Dark Waters: True Story of the First Human-Powered Circumnavigation of Earth
- Winner of the 2012 ForeWord Reviews Book of the Year Award (Adventure & Recreation) for The Expedition, Dark Waters: True Story of the First Human-Powered Circumnavigation of Earth
- Grand Prize Winner of the 2012 Southern California Book Festival for The Expedition, True Story of the First Human-Powered Circumnavigation of the Earth

== Other Honours ==
- London University Hon Fellow (RHC)
- Royal Geographical Society Fellow (FRGS)
- Explorers Club Fellow
- Royal Scottish Geographical Society (FRSGS)

== Film ==
Throughout his 13-year expedition, Lewis' friend, cinematographer Kenny Brown, collected many hundreds of hours of footage, and has compiled the work into a feature-length documentary titled, The Expedition.

== Webcomic ==
In 2012, artist Kris Stacks and writer Anthony DiMatteo created a 27-page black and white webcomic based on the writings of Lewis. The free webcomic was titled Expedition360.

== Personal life ==
In his earlier years before Expedition 360, Lewis worked as a window cleaner, and as a member of a rock n' roll cover band. Before carrying out his 13-year human-powered circumnavigation, Lewis had never crossed an ocean before. Nor had he roller bladed, kayaked, or ridden a bike for more than a few miles.

He regularly delivers inspirational speeches about global sustainability, and appears for book signings and readings to promote The Expedition trilogy. He also frequently writes for magazines and travel books. Lewis is vegan and a strong animal rights supporter, known for saying he "won't eat anything that has a face."

When Lewis was recuperating in Colorado during his expedition, he gave talks at schools. It was there that he met Tammie Stevens, an actress, who was taking a theatre workshop at the same school. After Lewis returned to London in 2007, he was offered a six-figure advance for a book about his experience, but he rejected the deal upon learning he'd have to work with a ghost writer, leaving him broke, homeless and unemployed. It was then that Stevens sent him an e-mail to reconnect. Upon hearing about his plight, she started her own publishing company, Billy Fish Books. They later married and settled in the Beulah mountain community in Colorado. In Beulah, they hosted a "Don't Nix It, Fix It" repair party to encourage sustainability in 2019.

== Television appearances and video ==
- BBC News Featurette
- Around the world in 13 years' Newscaster: Alphonso Van Marsh, CNN International, England, 6 October 2007; republished by Rogers Yahoo Video as Around the world in 13 years: Human Powered Voyage, 8 October 2007.
- CBS This Morning,
- The Tonight Show With Jay Leno
- Long Way Down

== See also ==
- Erden Eruç
- Aleksander Doba
- Circumnavigation
- Mixed transportation circumnavigations
