= List of circumnavigations =

The Magellan–Elcano expedition was the world's first circumnavigation.

This is a list of circumnavigations of Earth. Sections are ordered by ascending date of completion.

== Global ==
=== Nautical ===
==== 16th century ====
- The 18 survivors, led by Juan Sebastián Elcano (Spanish), of Ferdinand Magellan's Spanish expedition (which began with 5 ships and 270 men); 1519–1522; westward from Spain; in Victoria. After Magellan was killed by Lapulapu off the Philippines on 27 April 1521, the circumnavigation was completed under the command of the Basque Spanish seafarer Juan Sebastián Elcano who returned to Sanlúcar de Barrameda, Spain, on 6 September 1522, after a journey of 3 years and 1 month. These men were the first to circumnavigate the globe. A Malay member of the Magellan expedition, Enrique of Malacca, who was taken along as an interpreter, had earlier been taken from Malacca and travelled westwards with Magellan from Spain as far as the island of Cebu (now in the Philippines), where he was left behind on 1 May 1521. If he travelled the remaining 2500 km between Cebu and Malacca before the Magellan expedition's survivors reached Spain, he would have been the first person to circumnavigate the world and return to his starting point ahead. His fate after being left behind on Cebu, however, is unknown.
- The survivors of García Jofre de Loaísa's Spanish expedition 1525–1536 including Andrés de Urdaneta; westward from Spain. None of Loaísa's seven ships completed the voyage, but Santa María de la Victoria reached the Moluccas before being wrecked in a Portuguese attack. Successive chiefs of the expedition (Loaísa, Elcano, Salazar, Iñiguez, De la Torre) died during the voyages. Andrés de Urdaneta and other fellow men survived, reaching the Spice Islands in 1526, to be taken prisoner by the Portuguese. Urdaneta and three of his men returned to Spain in 1536 aboard 3 Portuguese ships via India, the Cape of Good Hope and Portugal. Other members of the expedition returned to Spain earlier, in 1534.
- At least 21 survivors of Ruy López de Villalobos' expedition to colonize the Philippines. Villalobos himself died on the journey, and the expedition began in New Spain. However, at least 20 individuals sailed from Spain or Portugal to New Spain prior to the start of the voyage, and eventually made it back. Another individual joined the voyage in the Philippine islands and later made it all the way back to the islands.
- One member of Miguel López de Legazpi's expedition to the Philippines, an interpreter named Jorge Pacheco. Originally from Mengalum Island in modern-day Malaysia, he went to Portugal, Spain, and then new Spain, where he was appointed to join the expedition in 1561. Following the expedition, he returned to the islands. After the return trip of the Legazpi expedition, (the first trip from the Philippines back to New Spain) the Spanish could sail both ways across the pacific and generally avoided more circumnavigations.
- Hans von Aachen (German) was one of the four survivors of the Loaísa expedition who returned in 1534, and also one of the 18 survivors of Magellan's expedition, making him the first to circumnavigate the world twice.
- Francis Drake (English); expedition against the Spanish Main 1577–1580; westward from England; in Golden Hind; discovered the Drake Passage but entered the Pacific via the Strait of Magellan; first English circumnavigation and the second carried out in a single expedition. Drake was the first to complete a circumnavigation as captain while leading the expedition throughout the entire circumnavigation.
- Martín Ignacio de Loyola (Spanish); 1580–1584, westward from Spain.
- Thomas Cavendish (English); 1586–1588; westward from England; in Desire.
- Martín Ignacio de Loyola (Spanish); 1585–1589, eastward from Spain (via Macau (then a Portuguese territory), China, and Acapulco, Mexico) to become the first to circumnavigate the world eastwards and first to use overland routes in his circumnavigation.
- João da Gama (Portuguese); 1584 (or 1585)–1590; eastward from Portugal; from Lisbon to India, Malacca, Macau (then Portuguese) and Japan. Gama crossed the Pacific at a higher northern latitude; was taken prisoner in Mexico and carried in Spanish ships to the Iberian Peninsula. One of the first to go eastwards, mostly by sea.

==== 17th century ====
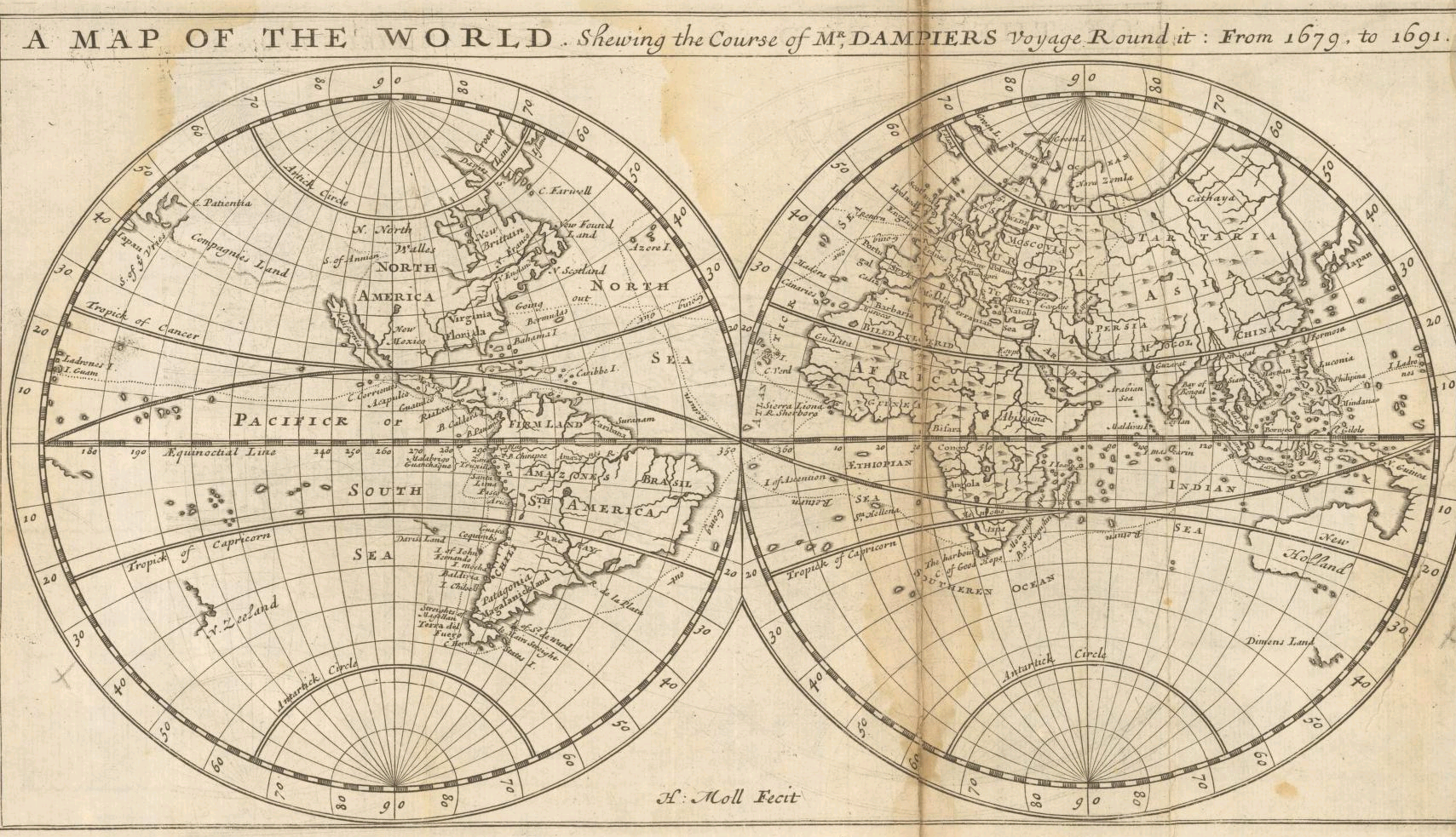
The map of Dampier's circumnavigation produced by Herman Moll (1697)

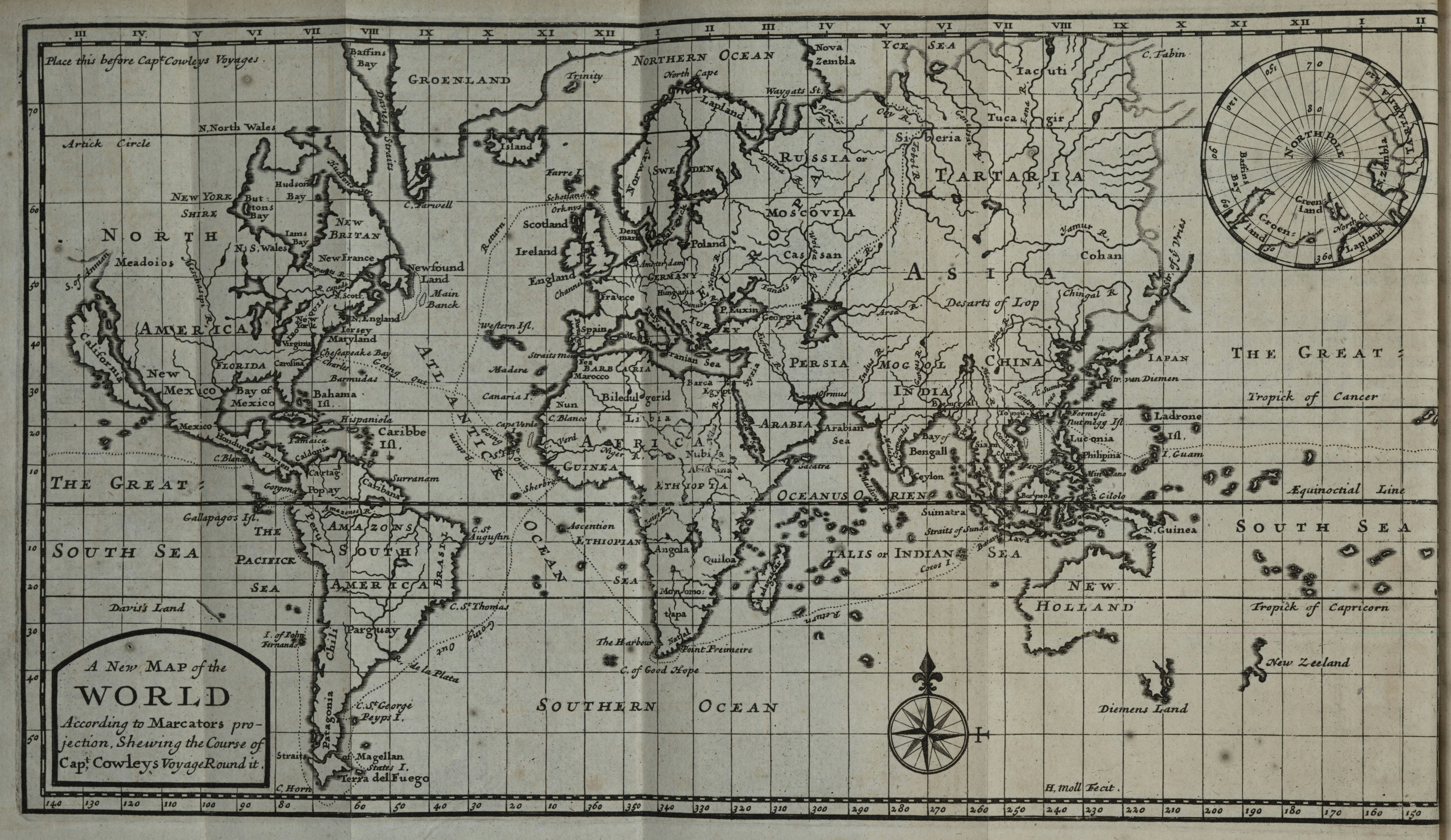
The map of Ambrose Cowley's circumnavigation in the 1699 edition of his travels

- The survivors of the expedition of Jacques Mahu (Dutch); 1598–1601; westward from Holland; Of Mahu's five ships only one returned.
- The survivors of the expedition of Olivier van Noort (Dutch); 1598–1601; westward from Holland; Of Van Noort's four ships only one returned.
- Francesco Carletti (Italian); Florentine merchant; 1594–1602; westward from Italy; travelled across the American continent overland, through Panama. All Carletti's other travel was by sea until he ended in the Netherlands; he travelled from there overland back to Italy. Carletti was perhaps the first to travel all legs as a passenger, not as a ship's officer or a crew member. Carletti described his journey in his autobiography, "My Voyage Around the World", translated into various languages.
- Joris van Spilbergen (Dutch); 1614–1617; westward from Holland.
- Willem Schouten and Jacob Le Maire (Dutch); 1615–1617; expedition conducted westward from Holland; in Eendraght; Discovered Cape Horn and the first expedition to enter the Pacific via the Drake Passage.
- Admiral Jacques l'Hermite, Vice-admiral John Hugo Schapenham, and Rear-admiral Jan Willemszn Verschoor (Dutch); 1623–1626; westward from Holland.
- Pedro Cubero (Spain); 1670–1679; eastward from Spain; the first maritime circumnavigation including significant travel overland.
- William Dampier and Ambrose Cowley (English); 1679–1691 and 1683–1686; westward from England, travelling together in parts of their voyages and producing the first maps of the Galapagos Islands while raiding Spanish shipping between Panama and Peru.
- Gemelli Careri (Italian); 1693–1698; eastward from Naples; the first tourist to circumnavigate the globe, paying his own way on multiple voyages, crossing Mexico on land.

==== 18th century ====
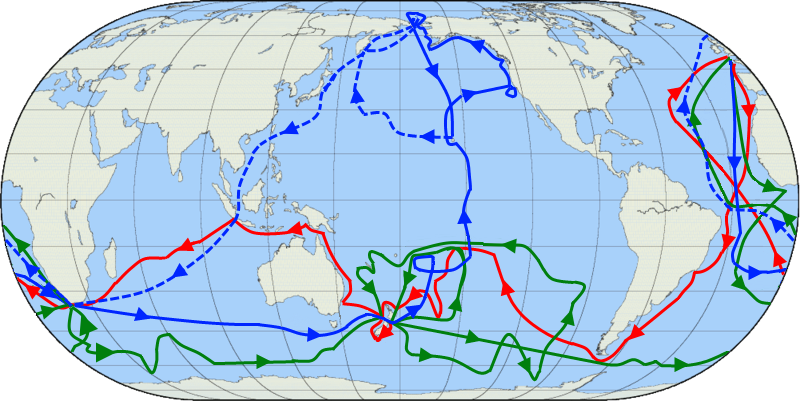
The routes of James Cook's voyages. The first voyage is shown in red, second voyage in green, and third voyage in blue. The route of Cook's crew following his death is shown as a dashed blue line.

- William Funnell (English); 1703–1706.
- William Dampier (English); 1703–1706.
- Woodes Rogers (British); 1708–1711; with the Duke and the Duchess; He rescued Alexander Selkirk on Juan Fernandez on 31 January 1709. Selkirk had been stranded there for four years.
- William Dampier (British); 1708–1711; First person to circumnavigate the world three times (1679–1691, 1703–1707 and 1708–1711).
- Gentile of the Barbinais (French); 1714–1718. The second circumnavigation of a commercial passenger.
- George Shelvocke (British); 1719–1721.
- John Clipperton (British); 1719–1722. Privateer, initially sailed with George Shelvocke.
- Jacob Roggeveen (Dutch); 1721–1724.
- George Anson, 1st Baron Anson (British); 1740–1744; in HMS Centurion.
- John Byron (British); 1764–1766; in HMS Dolphin.
- Samuel Wallis and Philip Carteret (British); 1766–1768; in HMS Dolphin and HMS Swallow; Carteret had served on Byron's expedition. Dolphin was the first ship to survive two circumnavigations.
- Louis-Antoine de Bougainville (French); 1766–1769; On board was Jeanne Baré, disguised as a man, the first woman to circumnavigate the globe; first French circumnavigation.
- James Cook (British); 1768–1771; in HMS Endeavour; The first circumnavigation to lose no personnel to scurvy.
- Tobias Furneaux (British); 1772–1774; in HMS Adventure. First east-to-west circumnavigation entirely by sea. Furneaux was a veteran of Byron's expedition. Furneaux was part of Cook's 1772–1775 circumnavigation, but they became separated, and Furneaux returned to Britain before Cook.
- James Cook (British); 1772–1775; in HMS Resolution.
- George Dixon and Nathaniel Portlock (British); 1785–1788; in Queen Charlotte and King George respectively; early pioneers of the Maritime Fur Trade between the Pacific Northwest and China.
- Alessandro Malaspina (Spanish); 1786–1788.
- Archibald Menzies (British); 1786–1789
- Robert Gray (American maritime fur trader); 1787–1790; first American circumnavigation.
- John Hunter (British); 1788–1789
- Alessandro Malaspina; 1789–1794.
- Etienne Marchand (French); 1790–1792
- Edward Edwards (British); 1790–1792
- George Vancouver (British); 1791–1795; Prior to commanding the Vancouver Expedition, George Vancouver had also participated in the circumnavigations of the HMS Resolution during James Cook's second voyage, and the HMS Discovery during James Cook's third voyage.
- John Boit (American maritime fur trader); 1794–1796; in Union; first sloop of her size and rig to sail around the world.

==== 19th century ====
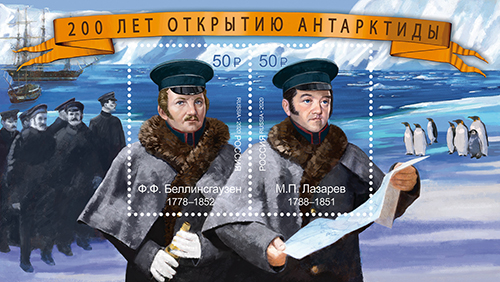
Fabian Gottlieb von Bellingshausen and Mikhail Lazarev

- Ignacio María de Álava; 1795–1803; in Montañés, flagship of a Spanish Navy.
- Francisco Javier de Balmis; 1803–1806, led the Balmis Expedition, the first international healthcare expedition in history.
- Adam Johann von Krusenstern and Yuri Lisyansky; 1803–1806; the first Russian circumnavigation.
- John DeWolf; 1804–1808; circumnavigation by sea and land; first American to travel overland across Siberia; first person known to have circumnavigated the globe by way of an overland route across Russia.
- Hippolyte Bouchard;1817–1819; in "La Argentina"; the first Argentine circumnavigation.
- Fabian Gottlieb von Bellingshausen and Mikhail Lazarev; 1819–1821; the first circumnavigation mostly between 60° and 70° S, discovered Antarctica and the first islands south of the Antarctic Circle.
- HMS Warspite; 1826–1827; as part of her assuming the role of the flagship of the South American station squadron, from England via Cape of Good Hope, Burma, Australia and Brazil, returning to England via the Caribbean.
- USS Vincennes, 3 September 1826 – 8 June 1830; from New York by way of Cape Horn, visiting the Hawaiian islands in 1829 and Macau in 1830. Her return voyage was made by way of China, the Philippines, the Indian Ocean, and the Cape of Good Hope. After nearly four years, Vincennes arrived back in New York under Commander William B. Finch. Two days later the ship was decommissioned.
- USS Potomac; 19 August 1831 – 23 May 1834; Commodore John Downes commanding, departed New York for the first Sumatran Expedition via the Cape of Good Hope, and returned via Cape Horn to Boston.
- Robert Fitzroy; 1831–1836; in HMS Beagle; with Charles Darwin.
- Sir George Simpson; 1841–1842; made the first "land circumnavigation" by crossing Canada and Siberia.
- USS Constitution; May 1844 – September 1846; commanded by Captain John Percival.
- The paddle sloop HMS Driver; 1845–1847; first steamship circumnavigation.
- The first Galathea expedition; 1845–1847; first Danish circumnavigation.
- HMS Herald; 1845–1851; Discovered Herald Island in the Bering Straits while searching for the Sir John Franklin Expedition.
- The screw frigate Amazonas; 1856–1858; first Peruvian circumnavigation.
- SMS Novara; 1857–1859; first Austrian circumnavigation.
- Shenandoah; 1864–65; only Confederate ship to circumnavigate. Captain James Iredell Waddell.
- Casto Méndez Núñez; 1865–1868; aboard Numancia; first ironclad warship circumnavigation; "Enloricata navis que primo terram circuivit".
- Ulysses S. Grant; 1877–1879; included the first meeting of a former United States president (Grant) and a monarch of the United Kingdom, Queen Victoria.
- The corvette Vital de Oliveira; 19 November 1879 – 21 January 1881; commanded by Júlio César de Noronha; first Brazilian circumnavigation.
- King Kalākaua; 1881; first monarch to circumnavigate the globe.
- Nellie Bly; 1889–1890; one of the first female journalists to solo circumnavigate the globe at the record-breaking 72 days.
- Fernando Villaamil; 1892–1894; aboard Nautilus; first training ship circumnavigation.
- Joshua Slocum; 1895–1898; first single-handed circumnavigation.

==== 20th century ====
- The Great White Fleet; 1907–1909; first fleet to circumnavigate the world.
- HMS New Zealand 1913, first by a Dreadnought era battleship or battlecruiser.
- Harry Pidgeon; 1921–1925; second single-handed circumnavigation.
- Conor O'Brien; 1923–1925; in Saoirse, a 20-ton 42 ft ketch, designed by himself and built in Baltimore, Ireland. First small private craft to circumnavigate west to east and south of the three great capes: Cape Horn, Cape of Good Hope and Cape Leeuwin SW Australia – the Clipper route.
- HMS Hood, HMS Repulse, and the rest of the Special Service Squadron; 1923–24; in the Empire Cruise, a tour of the British Empire after World War I.
- Francesco Aurelio Geraci; 1932–1935; first Italian to circumnavigate the globe with his little wooden ship M.A.S. (Memento Audere Semper).
- Harry Pidgeon; 1932–1937; third single-handed circumnavigation, first person to circumnavigate solo twice (1921–1925 and 1932–1937).
- Electa and Irving Johnson; 1934–1958; sail training pioneers, circumnavigated the world seven times with amateur crews.
- Vito Dumas; 1942; single handed circumnavigation of the southern oceans, including the first single handed passage of all three great capes.
- Operation Sandblast; 1960; USS Triton; first underwater circumnavigation.
- Operation Sea Orbit; 1964; USS Enterprise, USS Long Beach, and USS Bainbridge; first circumnavigation by an all-nuclear naval task force.
- 1966 Soviet submarine global circumnavigation; 1966; K-133 and K-116; first underwater circumnavigation conducted by the Soviet Union.
- Francis Chichester; 1966–1967; first single-handed circumnavigation with just one port of call.
- Alec Rose; 1967–1968; single-handed circumnavigation with two stops (in Australia and New Zealand) in yawl Lively Lady (see also 21st century).
- Leonid Teliga; 1967–1969; single-handed circumnavigation aboard SY Opty.
- Robin Knox-Johnston; 1968–1969; first single-handed non-stop circumnavigation.
- Robin Lee Graham; 1965–1970; then youngest (at ages 16–21) solo circumnavigation aboard 24-foot sailboat Dove.
- Chay Blyth; 1971; first westwards single-handed non-stop circumnavigation.
- Edward Allcard; 1957–1973; circumnavigation via the three great capes aboard his 36-foot wooden ketch Sea Wanderer.
- Webb Chiles; solo circumnavigation 6 times, with the first being in 1975–1976
- Jon Sanders; 1970–2021; completed eleven circumnavigations.
  - 1970 First solo circumnavigation trip east to west mostly sailing through tropics.
  - 1981–82 Double nonstop solo circumnavigation west to east via Southern Ocean.
  - 1986–88 Triple non-stop solo circumnavigation: 657 days 21 hours and 18 minutes at sea. Guinness World Records cites this as the longest distance sailed non-stop by any vessel (71,023 nautical miles)
  - 2016–17 Completed 10th circumnavigation at the age of 78, mostly singlehanded.
  - 2019–21 Completed 11th circumnavigation at the age of 81
- USS Inchon; ETR-3 crew September 1972 – September 1973 Circumnavigation via Panama Canal Norfolk VA. East to west.
- Kenichi Horie; 1974; First person to sail solo non-stop across the Pacific in 1962. Circumnavigated the Earth East to West in 1974, and North to South in 1978. Also became the oldest to single hand non-stop across the Pacific in 2022 at 84.
- Krystyna Chojnowska-Liskiewicz; 1976–1978; first woman to perform a single-handed circumnavigation.
- Naomi James; 1977–1978; first woman to perform a single-handed circumnavigation via Cape Horn.
- Mark Schrader; 1982; completed two solo circumnavigations. In 1982–1983 became the first American to complete a solo circumnavigation via the five southernmost capes.
- Marvin Creamer; 21 December 1982 – 17 May 1984; only known person to circumnavigate the globe by boat with no nautical aids
- Bertie Reed – 1982 – the first South African to complete three singlehanded circumnavigations.
- Nikolay Dzambasov; 1 September 1983 – 25 July 1985; the first Bulgarian to circumnavigate the globe; traveled in a self-made yacht.
- David Scott Cowper; 1985; first single-handed circumnavigation by motor boat.
- Peter Freeman; 14 October 1984 – 14 July 1985; Skippered a Hartley 32 ferro-cement sloop Laiviņa, from Victoria, British Columbia, Canada in 236 days. Set a new Guinness World Record.
- Dodge Morgan; 12 November 1985 – 11 April 1986; Aboard sailboat American Promise, became first American to sail solo around the world, non-stop.
- Trishna; 28 September 1985 – 10 January 1987; First Indian circumnavigation by an Indian Army Corps of Engineers crew. Also had the first handicapped (one-legged) sailor to sail around the globe.
- USS Missouri (BB-63); 10 September – 19 December 1986; Circumnavigation of recommissioned battleship for Shakedown prior to operational deployment; port calls at allies in Australia, Turkey, Italy, Spain, and Portugal. As the feat was not subsequently repeated by another battleship, and all battleships are now withdrawn from service and widely regarded as obsolete, this stands as the final global circumnavigation by a major–caliber gun armed battleship.
- Serge Testa; 1987; an Australian yachtsman who holds the world record for the circumnavigation in the smallest boat, completing the voyage in 1987, in his 11-foot-10-inch (3.61 m) boat, the Acrohc Australis.
- Teddy Seymour; 1987; aboard sailboat Love Song; the first African-American to complete solo single-handed circumnavigation.
- Mike Plant; 1987–1991; completed three circumnavigations.
  - 1986–87: Won the BOC Challenge with a time of 157 days aboard Airco Distributor, an Open 50 sloop built by Plant and designed by Roger Martin.
  - 1989: Competed in the first Vendée Globe on Duracell, an Open 60 sloop built by Plant and designed by Roger Martin. Although eliminated from the race after receiving help with a rudder repair in New Zealand, Plant still set a record for the fastest American to sail single-handed around the world with a time of 135 days.
  - 1990/91: Finished 4th overall in the BOC Challenge, setting the highest mark in a solo-sailing event for an American with a time of 132 days.
- Tania Aebi; 1985–1987; American woman who completed a solo circumnavigation by the age of 21, one 80-nautical-mile (150 km) stretch with crew disqualified her from an official record.
- Kay Cottee; 1988; first woman to perform a solo non-stop circumnavigation.
- Tracy Edwards; 1989–90; skippered the first all-female crew in the 1989–1990 Whitbread Round the World Race in Maiden.
- David Scott Cowper; 1990; first single-handed circumnavigation via the North West Passage.
- William (Bill) Deltoris Pinkney III; 1990–1992; Via the 5 Great Capes of the southern oceans. He departed from Boston 5 August 1990. Sailing first to Bermuda, then along the eastern South American coastline, across the Atlantic Ocean to Cape Town, South Africa, across the Indian Ocean to Hobart, Tasmania, across the South Pacific Ocean, around Cape Horn, and up the eastern South American coastline, finally ending up back in Boston. Pinkney sailed a Valiant 47, named "Commitment".
- Duncan McQueen; 1992–1999;
- Pat Lawless Snr; 1993–1996 Irish solo sailor, took him 3 years and 3 days in his 32-foot yacht Loon. He returned to Limerick, Ireland at the age of 70 after his solo circumnavigation.
- Lisa Clayton; 1994–1995; first British woman to sail single-handed and non-stop around the world.
- Robbie Marshall; 1995–1996; Completed a solo circumnavigation of the world on his Triumph Trophy 1200. It took him 51 weeks, after which he wrote a book about his travels. His trip was the first solo round-world account committed to tape.
- Brian Caldwell; 1995–1996; '1st-Under-Age-21' to complete solo circumnavigation with stops, completed by age 20.
- David Dicks; 1996; youngest recognized assisted circumnavigation, completed aged 18 years 41 days.
- Karen Thorndike; 1996–1998; Guinness record as the first American woman to sail solo around the world without assistance, not done continuously
- Henk de Velde; 1997; sailed a catamaran eastbound around the world in 119 days, non-stop. He is still the only person in the world to perform this feat single-handed with a catamaran, although others have made faster single-handed circumnavigations in trimarans (Ellen MacArthur, 2005, and Francis Joyon, 2008).
- Cable and Wireless Adventurer; 1998; 74 days, 20 hours, 58 minutes, a new Guinness World Record for a powered vessel.
- Robert E. Case; 1998–2001; American who was the first solo amputee to sail around the world.
- Amyr Klink; 1998–1999; Brazilian who completed a solo circumnavigation of Antarctica in 88 days.
- Jesse Martin; 1999; youngest recognized unassisted circumnavigation, completed aged 18 years 66 days.
- Azhar Mansor; 1999; first Malaysian to sail solo around the world.
- Alex Thomson; 1999; youngest skipper ever to win a round the world race (Clipper 1998–1999).
- Daniel D. Moreland; 1997–1998; first circumnavigation of sail training vessel Picton Castle.
- Vinny Lauwers; 1999–2000; 233d 13h 43m 8s; 21760 nm; Vision Quest; first single-handed circumnavigation by a disabled sailor (paraplegic).
- Wladek Wagner, 1932–1939, first Polish citizen to sail around the world. He wrote the book By the Sun and Stars about the voyage.

==== 21st century ====
- Wilfried Erdmann; 14 August 2000 – 23 July 2001 in 343 days; monohull Kathena Nui; solo westward non-stop circumnavigation.
- Ellen MacArthur; 2001; monohull; circumnavigated singlehandedly as the then fastest woman.
- Mike Golding; 2001; first person to circumnavigate non-stop in both eastward and westward directions. 1993 World record for a westward circumnavigation, 161 days, Group 4. 2001 Vendee Globe Race 7th position.
- INS Tarangini; 2003–2004; first Indian sail naval ship to circumnavigate the globe with the theme of "building bridges of friendship across the oceans".
- Bruno Peyron and crew; 2005; aboard maxi catamaran Orange II; set the then current wind-powered circumnavigation record, 50 days, 16 hours, 20 minute.
- Alan Priddy; 2004–2006; circumnavigation in Alec Rose's (see 1968) Lively Lady with crews of disadvantaged young adults.
- Ellen MacArthur; 2005; trimaran B&Q/Castorama; then the fastest singlehanded circumnavigation (71 days), was still the fastest woman in 2010. See also 2001.
- Dee Caffari; first female to sail non-stop round the world westabout and both ways;
  - 2005–2006; first woman to perform a solo westward non-stop circumnavigation, in 178 days.
  - 2008-2009 Vendee Globe Race (Solo Nonstop Eastabout) onboard IMOCA 60 Aviva in 99 days 1 hrs 10 min 57 sec
- Álvaro de Bazán; 2007; First circumnavigation of the globe by a Spanish warship in 142 years.
- RMS Queen Mary 2; 2007 world cruise; at 148,528 gross ton, the world's largest passenger ship to circumnavigate the globe.
- Earthrace; 2008; wave-piercing trimaran, with two 540-horsepower multi-fueled engines; current world record holder for a motorized vessel (disputed with USS Triton, 1960), in 60 days 23 hours and 49 minutes.
- Francis Joyon; 2008; 95 ft (29 m) IDEC 2; fastest singlehanded multihull circumnavigation at that time, 57 days 13 hours 34 minutes 06 seconds.
- Michael Perham; 2009; then youngest person (aged 16–17 years) to perform a singlehanded circumnavigation (with stops, through Panama Canal).
- Franck Cammas and a crew of 10; 2010; French trimaran Groupama 3; set the fastest maritime circumnavigation at the time, in a time of 48 days, 7 hours 44 minutes and 52 seconds.
- Dilip Donde (Indian Navy); 2009–2010; first Indian to carry out a solo circumnavigation; stopped in four ports – Fremantle, Lyttelton, Port Stanley and Cape Town.
- Jessica Watson; 2009–2010; youngest person (aged 16) to perform a solo non-stop southern hemisphere circumnavigation (past Cape Horn).
- Reid Stowe; 2007–2010; eastbound circumnavigation, 1152 days; longest time spent at sea without resupply or touching land.
- Minoru Saito; 2008–2011; oldest person (aged 77) to perform a singlehanded circumnavigation (westbound, past Cape Horn, with stops). He has made eight singlehanded circumnavigations; after the seventh (which was non-stop) at age 71 he was already the oldest.
- PlanetSolar; 2010–2012; first solar vehicle to circumnavigate the globe.
- Laura Dekker; 2011–2012; youngest person (aged 14–16 years) to perform a singlehanded circumnavigation (with stops, through Panama Canal).
- Jerome Rand, Oct 2017 to June 2018, 271 day, unsponsored, nonstop circumnavigation from Gloucester MA on a Westsail 32 (Mighty Sparrow)
- British sailor Jeanne Socrates; 2018–2019; oldest woman (aged 77) to single-handedly sail around the world, non-stop without outside assistance, for a year oldest person until Bill Hatfield sailed at a higher age. Also oldest woman at the time (aged 70) to do the same thing 2012–2013, also making her first woman to make solo non-stop unassisted circumnavigation from west coast of North America (Victoria BC, Canada). Oldest, in 2010–2011 (aged 68), to sail single-handedly around the world, with stops. Both were eastbound via Cape Horn.
- Bill Hatfield; 2019–2020; oldest person (at 81) to sail solo non-stop unassisted single-handedly around the world, also first person (of any age) to sail solo non-stop unassisted single-handedly westabout (westbound) around the world in an under 40 ft vessel.
- Abhilash Tomy (Indian Navy); 2012–2013; first Indian to sail solo, non-stop around the world without outside assistance. Sailed south of the five southernmost capes.
- Gerry Hughes; 2012–2013; first deaf yachtsman to sail single-handed around the world to pass the five great capes. On 1 September 2012, Hughes left Troon, Scotland to start his eight-month journey across the world. Hughes travel around the world solo, sailed 32,000 miles and became the first deaf yachtsman to passed all five southernmost capes.
- INSV Tarini (Indian Navy); 2017–2018; six female naval officers sailed south of the five southernmost capes during their Navika Sagar Parikrama expedition; they stopped in Fremantle, Lyttelton, Port Stanley and Cape Town.
- Hōkūleʻa; 2013-2019; traditionally rigged Polynesian voyaging canoe circumnavigated the world using only non-instrument navigation techniques, visiting 150 ports and 18 nations to bring awareness of and inspire indigenous communities around the world. Also disproved the then Euro-centric theory perpetuated by Thor Heyerdahl that Polynesians were not capable of deliberately crossing the Pacific by travelling from Hawai'i to Tahiti using the same traditional navigation methods in 1975.
- 2020–2021 Vendée Globe Race a total of 25 sailors completed a solo non-stop circumnavigation and 2 more completed a stopping.
- Jason Jernigan, Oct 2019 - June 2023; Singlehanded circumnavigation via Panama and South Africa in SV Lora 1972 Alberg 30.
- Cole Brauer; 2023–2024; first woman from the United States to sail single-handed around the world nonstop and unassisted.

==== Fastest ====
- Operation Sandblast; 1960; USS Triton; first underwater circumnavigation, and fastest mechanically powered circumnavigation (disputed with Earthrace, 2008), in 60 days 21 hours.
- Jon Sanders; 1986–1988; holds the world record for completing a single-handed, non-stop, triple circumnavigation, in 657 days 21 hours and 18 minutes.
- Jean-Luc Van Den Heede (French); 2004; fastest westward single-handed circumnavigation, 122 days 14 hours 3 minutes 49 seconds.
- Adrienne Cahalan (Australian); February–March 2004; fastest woman to complete a circumnavigation (crew of "Cheyenne") 58 days 9 hours 32 minutes 45 seconds.
- Earthrace; 2008; wave-piercing trimaran, with two 540 horsepower multi-fueled engines; current world record holder for a motorized vessel (disputed with USS Triton, 1960), in 60 days 23 hours and 49 minutes.
- François Gabart (French); Nov 2017–Dec 2017; current fastest single-handed circumnavigation, in 42 days, 16 hours, 40 minutes, 35 seconds.
- Francis Joyon and crew of five sailors; Dec 2016–Jan 2017; the Maxi trimaran IDEC SPORT; current absolute (wind or mechanically powered) fastest maritime circumnavigation, in 40 days 23 hours 30 minutes 30 seconds of sailing. Average speed of 26.85 knots (30.71 mph), covering a total distance of 26,412 nautical miles (48,915 km; 30,394 mi).
- Bill Hatfield (Australian); 22 February 2020; fastest single-handed westbound circumnavigation in a vessel of under 40 feet (12 m) in length: 258 days, 22 hours, 24 minutes, and 9 seconds

=== Aerial ===
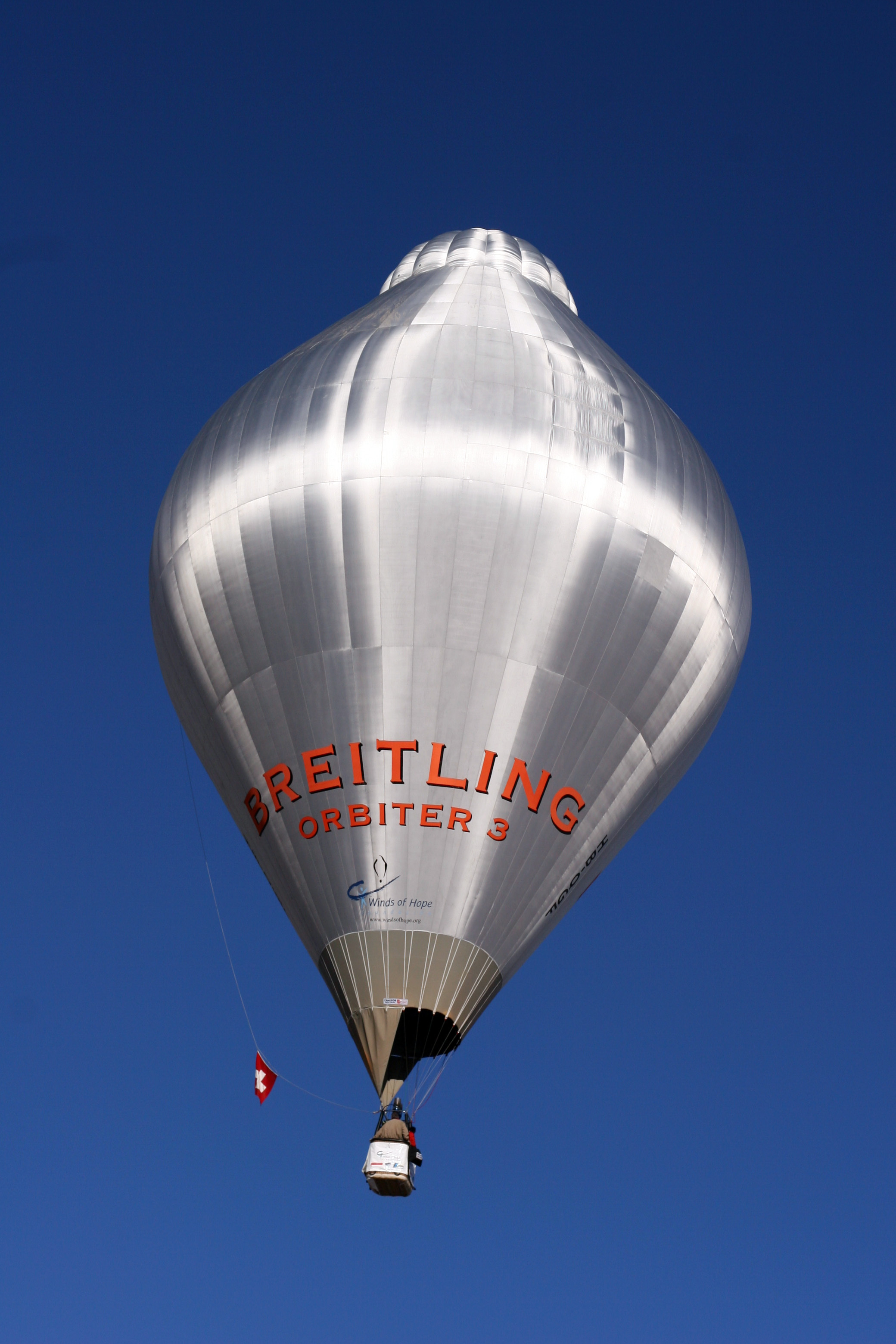
In 1999, Bertrand Piccard and Brian Jones achieved the first non-stop balloon circumnavigation in Breitling Orbiter 3.

- Two open-cockpit biplanar Douglas World Cruiser floatplanes of the United States Army Air Service, piloted by Lowell H. Smith, Leslie P. Arnold, Erik H. Nelson and John Harding Jr., made the first aerial circumnavigation, in 1924, taking 175 days, covering 26,345 miles (42,398 km).
- LZ-127 Graf Zeppelin, in 1929, piloted by Hugo Eckener made the first circumnavigation by an airship. It was also the then fastest aerial circumnavigation, in 21 days.
- Between 1928 and 1930 Charles Kingsford Smith made a series of flights completing the first circumnavigation by monoplane and first "true" circumnavigation (crossing equator) by air.
- In 1931 Wiley Post and navigator Harold Gatty made the first circumnavigation in a single-engined aircraft, completing a west to east journey within the Northern hemisphere and travelling 15,474 miles (24,903 km) in 8 days, 15 hours and 51 minutes.
- In 1932, Wolfgang von Gronau made the first aerial circumnavigation by flying boat in a twin-engine Dornier seaplane, Gronland-Wal D-2053, in nearly four months, making 44 stops en route. He was accompanied by co-pilot Gerth von Roth, mechanic Franzl Hack, and radio operator Fritz Albrecht.
- In 1933, Wiley Post repeated his 1931 circumnavigation by aeroplane, but this time solo, using an autopilot and radio direction finder. He made the first solo aerial circumnavigation in a time one day faster than his previous record: 7 days, 19 hours, 49 minutes, in which he covered 25,110 kilometres (15,600 mi), but did not cross the equator.
- Following the Attack on Pearl Harbor in 1941, a Boeing 314 piloted by Robert Ford was forced to fly from Auckland, New Zealand to New York following the westerly route. Landing in Natal, Brazil and continuing on to New York, the Ford's Boeing 314 became the first commercial aircraft to circumnavigate the world.
- Richarda Morrow-Tait became the first woman pilot to fly around the world, accompanied by navigator Michael Townsend, in a year and a day, from 18 August 1948 to 19 August 1949.
- In 1949, the United States Air Force B-50 Superfortress Lucky Lady II made the first non-stop aerial circumnavigation in 94 hours and 1 minute. Four in-air refuelings were required for the flight, which covered 37,743 kilometres (23,452 mi).
- In 1957, three United States Air Force Boeing B-52 Stratofortresses made the first non-stop jet-aircraft circumnavigation in 45 hours and 19 minutes, with two in-air refuelings. The 39,147 kilometres (24,325 mi) flight was completed at an average speed of 525 miles per hour.
- Geraldine Mock, 1964, first woman to complete a solo aerial circumnavigation, in a Cessna 180.
- Flying Tigers Boeing 707, crewed by five airline pilots, completed the first circumnavigation via the poles, 14–17 November 1965, in 62 hours 27 minutes.

(Widespread introduction of Very Low Frequency navigational aids)

- Elgen Long, 1971, first solo circumnavigation via the poles, in a Piper Navajo.
- Don Taylor, 1976, first circumnavigation by homebuilt aircraft.
- Ross Perot, Jr. and Jay Coburn, 1982, first circumnavigation by helicopter, by Bell 206L-1 LongRanger II
- Dick Smith, 1982–1983, first solo circumnavigation by helicopter, in a Bell Jetranger III.
- Donald "Rode" Rodewald, 1984, first circumnavigation by a paraplegic pilot in a Comanche 260 with hand controls.
- Dick Rutan and Jeana Yeager, 1986, Voyager, first non-stop non-refueled circumnavigation in an airplane, 9 days, 3 minutes and 44 seconds.
- Dick Smith, 1988–1989, first circumnavigation landing at both poles, in a Twin Otter.
- In 1992 an Air France Concorde, registration F-BTSD, achieved the fastest non-orbital circumnavigation in 32 hours 49 minutes and 3 seconds.
- Fred Lasby, 1994, oldest circumnavigation, at 82 years of age, in Piper Comanche.
- Dick Smith, 1994–95, first east–west circumnavigation by helicopter, in a Sikorsky S-76, a distance traveled of 73,352 kilometres (39,407 nautical miles).
- Peter Joohak Lee, 1998, first Asian to circumnavigate the globe on a single engine aircraft. Using a Cherokee 235, he traveled east for 36 days and 29,920 miles.
- Brian Milton, 1998, first microlight circumnavigation. He used an open-cockpit single engine Pegasus Quantum 912. No support aircraft escorted the flight. Keith Reynolds was copilot from Webridge, Surrey, to Yuzhno Sakhalinsk, Siberia. Then, as required by the Russian authorities, navigator Petr Petrov accompanied Milton to Nome, Alaska. Milton completed the rest of the 120-day voyage solo (71 flying days).
- Bertrand Piccard and Brian Jones, 1999, first non-stop balloon circumnavigation in Breitling Orbiter 3, 19 days, 1 hour and 49 minutes, covering 42,810 kilometres (26,600 mi).
- Jennifer Murray, 2000, first solo circumnavigation by a woman by helicopter.
- Colin Bodill, 2000, first solo circumnavigation by a microlight (Mainair Blade) in 99 days. Also held fastest circumnavigation by microlight until broken. Bodill was part of an entourage of 4 aircraft, one of which carried supplies and support.
- Steve Fossett, 2 July 2002, first solo balloon circumnavigation.
- Matevž Lenarčič; 2004; Circumnavigation with microlight aircraft Pipistrel".
- Steve Fossett, 3 March 2005, GlobalFlyer, first non-stop, non-refueled solo circumnavigation in an airplane, 67 hours, covering 37,000 kilometres (23,000 mi).
- Steve Fossett, 11 February 2006, GlobalFlyer, longest non-stop, non-refueled solo flight (with circumnavigation) in an airplane, covering 42,469.5 kilometres (26,389.3 mi), in 76 hours and 45 minutes.
- Barrington Irving, 27 June 2007, Inspiration, youngest solo circumnavigation in an airplane, at that time, 23 years, 228 days; left Miami, Florida, 23 March 2007, first stop, Cleveland, Ohio. (record broken numerous times subsequently)
- Rahul Monga and Anil Kumar, 2007, fastest circumnavigation in a microlight, 79 days. Team from the Indian Air Force to commemorate the 75 Anniversary of the founding of the Indian Air Force. Aircraft used was a Flight Design CTSW. They covered 40,529 kilometres (25,184 mi) in a total flight time of 247 hours and 27 minutes.
- Matt Guthmiller at age 19 became the youngest pilot to circumnavigate by aircraft, solo in 2014. Since then the record has been surpassed by Australian Lachlan Smart in 2016, American Mason Andrews in 2018 and Englishman Travis Ludlow in 2021.
- Swiss pilots Bertrand Piccard and André Borschberg, in the first circumnavigation by solar-powered aircraft, took off from Abu Dhabi aboard the Solar Impulse 2 on 9 March 2015, and were originally scheduled to complete their circumnavigation of the Northern Hemisphere in five months. Due to battery damage, continuation of the flight was postponed until April 2016. This circumnavigation was completed on 26 July 2016.
- Michael Smith, November 2015, first solo circumnavigation in a single-engine flying boat in Progressive Aerodyne SeaRey two-seater light sport aircraft
- Fyodor Konyukhov, 23 July 2016, broke the record for the fastest circumnavigation in a hot air balloon. He took "just over 11 days", breaking Steve Fossett's 2002 record of 13 1/2 days.
- Peter Wilson and Matthew Gallagher; 7 August 2017; First circumnavigation by helicopter through antipodes.
- Ravinder Bansal, 20 August 2017, became the first person of Indian origin to complete a solo circumnavigation in a single engine plane.
- Shaesta Waiz, 4 October 2017, became the youngest woman to fly solo around the world in a single-engine aircraft, a feat superseded by Zara Rutherford.
- Norman Surplus, 28 June 2019, first Gyroplane/Autogyro circumnavigation. Using an open cockpit, Rotorsport UK MT-03 Autogyro (Registered G-YROX – "Roxy"), Surplus flew a distance of 27,000 NM, through 32 Countries and set 19x FAI new world records. Initial departure was on 22 March 2010, but difficulty with Russian permission delayed the aircraft in Japan for 3.5 years. The circumnavigation was reset/continued from the Evergreen Aviation and Space Museum, McMinnville, Oregon on 1 June 2015 and was finally successfully completed on return to the same place on 28 June 2019.
- Terry W. Virts and Hamish Harding, 11 July 2019, fastest circumnavigation of the globe via the North and South Poles. Virts and Harding headed a crew of eight in a Gulfstream G650ER jet to circumnavigate the globe in a time of 46 hours, 40 minutes and 22 seconds, with an average speed of 860.95 km/h (534.97 mph).
- Robert DeLaurentis, 10 August 2020, the first pilot and aircraft (Turbine Commander 900 "Citizen of the World" N29GA) to successfully circumnavigate and use biofuels over the North and South poles. Initial departure from Gillespie Field, El Cajon, CA, was 17 November 2019, completed 10 August 2020 with a five-month delay due to Pandemic. Other first-time records include the longest distance flown in a twin or single engine turboprop—18.1 hours; first and fastest Polar circumnavigation in a twin or single engine turboprop; first testing for plastic microfibers across the globe including over the South and North poles.
- Zara Rutherford, 20 January 2022, became the youngest woman to fly solo around the world and the first person to complete the circumnavigation in a microlight. She began her westabout journey from her native Belgium on 18 August 2021.
- Mack Rutherford, 24 August 2022, became the youngest person to circumnavigate the world by aircraft solo and youngest person to circumnavigate the world by microlight.

=== Spacecraft ===
- On 12 April 1961 Yuri Gagarin made the first human flight in space, and completed the first orbit of the Earth, in Vostok 1, in 108 minutes.
- The second and third orbital circumnavigations, the first two to have multiple orbits, were made by Gherman Titov (17.5 orbits, a little over a day, for the Soviet Union) and John Glenn, in Friendship 7 (3 orbits, almost five hours, for the US, first American orbital flight), respectively.
- The first woman to circumnavigate the Earth in orbit, and to also do so multiple times, was Valentina Tereshkova, who made forty-eight orbits between 16 and 19 June 1963, aboard Vostok 6.
- Frank F. Borman II, James A. Lovell Jr., and William A. Anders, 21–27 December 1968, first human circumnavigation of the Earth-Moon system, 10 orbits around the moon in about 20 hours, aboard Apollo 8; total trip to the moon and back was more than 6 Earth days.

=== Human powered ===
Motorized transportation is permitted over water and where otherwise needed, but the human-powered distance must be a minimum of 18,000 miles (29,000 km) to qualify for a world record, according to Guinness rules since 2013.

- Thomas Stevens was the first person to circle the globe by bicycle. The feat was accomplished between 1884 and 1886. While impressive at the time, a good portion of the trip was by steamer due to technical and political constraints.
- Dave Kunst walked around the world between 20 June 1970 and 10 October 1974.
- Rick Hansen, a paraplegic athlete, became the first person to travel around the world in a wheelchair from 21 March 1985 to 22 May 1987, covering over 25,000 mi (40,000 km) through 34 countries on four continents.
- Robert Garside is credited by Guinness World Records as the first person to run around the world from 20 October 1997 to 13 June 2003, taking 2,062 days to cover 30,000 mi (48,000 km) across 29 countries and 6 continents.
- On 1 August 1999, Polly Letofsky left her home in Colorado on a five-year journey spanning four continents and 22 countries. She started her leg across Australia on 29 October 2000 from St Kilda Pier on Port Phillip Bay in Melbourne, and concluded on 22 July 2001 after arriving in Port Douglas. On 30 July 2004, she concluded her journey having walked over 22,730 km (14,120 mi), having raised over $250,000 for breast cancer research, and having officially become the first woman to have walked around the world.
- Steve Strange completed the first true cycling circumnavigation, riding for 276 days in 2004–2005, following updated Guinness World Record rules for a proper circumnavigation. Nick Sanders had set the record for cycling around the Northern Hemisphere in 1984, which was considered a circumnavigation by earlier Guinness rules.
- Jesper Olsen travelled 16,000 mi (26,000 km) from 1 January 2004 to 23 October 2005 during a circumnavigation solely on foot except for ocean crossings.
- Colin Angus circumnavigated the Northern Hemisphere solely by human power in 2006 but did not qualify under the Guinness guidelines as a human powered circumnavigation. His attempt, however, was recognized by National Geographic.
- Jason Lewis completed the first true human-powered circumnavigation (without sails or any motorized transport) from 12 July 1994 to 6 October 2007, covering 46,505 mi (74,843 km) in both the southern and northern hemispheres and reaching two antipodal points, gaining accreditation from Guinness World Records and Adventurestats by Explorersweb.
- Rosie Swale-Pope travelled 20,000 mi (32,000 km) from 2 October 2003 to 25 August 2008 during a circumnavigation solely on foot except for ocean crossings.
- Erden Eruç completed the first solo human-powered circumnavigation (without sails or any motorized transport) traveling by rowboat, sea kayak, foot and bicycle from 10 July 2007 to 21 July 2012. Erden crossed the equator two times, passed over 12 pairs of antipodal points, and logged 41,196 mi (66,299 km) while setting 13 Guinness records for ocean rowing.
- Juliana Buhring completed the first cycling circumnavigation by a solo female cyclist in 2012 following updated Guinness World Record rules for a cycling circumnavigation. She began in July and finished in December 2012 after 152 days of riding over 18,063 mi (29,070 km), averaging about 119 mi (192 km) a day.
- Paola Gianotti set a record for the fastest cycling circumnavigation by a female cyclist in 2014. She began her attempt on 8 March and finished on 30 November 2014—including four months of recovery after an accident that broke a vertebra—riding for 144 days over 18,389 mi (29,594 km), averaging about 128 mi (206 km) a day.
- Mark Beaumont set the current record for the fastest cycling circumnavigation in 2017. He began his attempt on 2 July and finished on 18 September 2017, after 78 days, 14 hours, and 40 minutes, averaging about 230 mi (370 km) a day on an 18,039-mile (29,031 km) ride across Europe, Asia, Australia, New Zealand, and North America. Beaumont had also broken the same record in 2008.
- Jenny Graham set a record for the fastest unsupported cycling circumnavigation in 2018. She completed the attempt in 124 days, 10 hours and 50 minutes, starting in Berlin on 16 June 2018, and arriving back on 18 October.
- Marie Leautey, of France, became the fastest woman to run a complete circumnavigation of the world, starting in 2019 and finishing on 1 September 2022, for a total time of 825 days.
- On 4 April 2024, Latvian adventurer Kārlis Bardelis completed a 2,898-day human-powered circumnavigation of the globe that involved rowing 46,326 km and cycling 11,972 km.
- Andrew Mortensen, of Texas, became the first openly gay man to officially cycle around the world, which he did non-continuously from 2020 until 2024.
- Lael Wilcox cycled around the world, starting in Chicago. She finished on 11 September 2024, having taken 108 days, 12 hours and 12 minutes to cycle 18,125 miles, becoming the fastest woman to cycle around the world.
- Ed Pratt is the second person to circumnavigate the world on a unicycle. Starting on March 14th, 2015, and taking 3 years and 135 days. The record is not officially recognized by Guinness, due to Pratt taking at least one break longer than 14 days.

=== Miscellaneous ===
- King Kalākaua traveled around the world, over land and sea, thus becoming the first reigning monarch to complete such a journey in 1881.
- Nellie Bly traveled around the world with public steamboats and trains in 72 days (from 14 November 1889, to 25 January 1890), a world record, resembling the Around the World in Eighty Days novel.
- Clärenore Stinnes and Carl-Axel Söderström were the first persons to drive around the world in a car between 25 May 1927 and 24 June 1929.
- Friedrich Karl von Koenig-Warthausen, in a Klemm L.20 aircraft over land and via ship for ocean legs, circumnavigated the globe solo, between August 1928 and November 1929.
- Mrs Victor Bruce completed the first solo partially aerial circumnavigation by a woman (crossing oceans by vessel) in 1931.
- Beginning in Montreal, Ben Carlin circumnavigated the world in a modified Ford GPA Jeep between 1950 and 1958, becoming the first person to circumnavigate the world by amphibious vehicle.
- Heinz Stücke has been cycling around the world since 1962.
- Arthur Blessitt walked around the world carrying a 45 lb (20 kg) wooden cross from 25 December 1969, covering 42,279 miles (68,041 km) through 324 countries. As of 13 June 2008, aged 67, he had walked in every country of the world, since when he has returned to some. He passed away in 2024 but was partaking in walks as late as 2019.
- Sir Ranulph Fiennes, Charles Burton, et al.; 1979–1982; first circumnavigation via the North and South Poles on the Transglobe Expedition.
- Garry Sowerby holds four world records for circumnavigation in an automobile.
- Vladimir Lysenko circumnavigated the globe from west to east, deviating no more than two degrees of latitude from the Equator. Starting in Libreville, Gabon, Lysenko crossed (in a car, a motor boat, a yacht, a ship, a kayak, a bicycle, and by foot) Africa, Indian Ocean, Indonesia, Pacific Ocean, South America and Atlantic Ocean, finishing in Libreville in 2012.
- Kane Avellano became the youngest person to circumnavigate the globe by motorcycle on a trip completed just one day before his 24th birthday. The circumnavigation began on 31 May 2016 and ended on 19 January 2017, with a total duration of 233 days. Avellano covered more than 28,000 miles (45,062 km), passing through 36 countries and 6 continents.
- The second season of Jet Lag: The Game, recorded in 2022, featured Sam Denby, Joseph Pisenti, Adam Chase and Ben Doyle racing to circumnavigate the world on commercial flights while completing various challenges; the race was won by Chase and Doyle after 93 hours of game time.
- On 26 March 2024, Lexie Alford set a world record as the first person to circumnavigate the globe in an electric vehicle, completing a 30,000 kilometres (19,000 mi) journey in the new all-electric Ford Explorer. The expedition, part of her "Charge Around The Globe" initiative with Ford, spanned six continents and 27 countries.

== Non-global ==
- Phoenician expedition sent by Pharaoh Necho II; c. 600 BC; possibly circumnavigating Africa.
- Pytheas of Massalia apparently circumnavigated the British Isles circa 325 BC, though his account of the exploration is lost, except for references to it in the works of classical historians.
- Jacques Cartier; 1534–1535; first circumnavigation of Newfoundland.
- García de Nodal; 1619; first circumnavigation of Tierra del Fuego.
- Abel Tasman; 1642–1643; first circumnavigation of the Australian continent (including New Guinea and Tasmania).
- James Cook; 1769–1770; first circumnavigation of New Zealand.
- James Cook; 1772–1775; first high-southern circumnavigation of Antarctica (including New Zealand's South Island).
- George Bass and Matthew Flinders; 1798; first circumnavigation of Tasmania, Australia.
- Matthew Flinders; 1801–1803; first circumnavigation of Australia (without Tasmania).
- Fabian Gottlieb von Bellingshausen; 1820–1821; first circumnavigation of Antarctica (without New Zealand).
- Robert McClure; 1850–1854; first both to circumnavigate the Americas, and to transit the Northwest Passage. All by sea save for a 550-mile stretch on foot over pack ice in the Parry Channel, from Mercy Bay to Beechey Island.
- Adolf Erik Nordenskiöld; 1878–1879; first circumnavigation of Eurasia, via the Northeast Passage and the Suez Canal, during the Vega expedition.
- St Roch; 1940–1942 and 1950; first vessel to circumnavigate North America. 1940–1942 Vancouver to Halifax, Nova Scotia, via the Northwest Passage. 1950, Halifax to Vancouver, via the Panama Canal.
- HMCS Labrador (AW 50); 1954; first vessel to circumnavigate North America in a single voyage, via the Panama Canal. Halifax west through Northwest Passage. South to Panama canal and return to Halifax.
- USS Belmont; 1967; circumnavigated South America via the Panama Canal.
- Apollo 8; 23 December 1968; first crewed circumnavigation of the Moon.
- CCGS Hudson; 1970; first circumnavigation of North and South America entirely by sea, including the Northwest Passage.
- Miles Clark; 1992; circumnavigation of Europe, going from the White Sea to the Black Sea through several Russian waterways.
- The making waves foundation project team, 2003, achieved the world record for a non-stop, unassisted circumnavigation around Australia by a monohulled vessel. The 7 person crew was made up of Albert Lee (double amputee), Al Grundy (polio), Kim Jaggar (amputee), David Pescud (dyslexic), Phil Thompson (amputee), Harald Merlieb (hearing impaired) and Brett Pearce (spina bifida). It took skipper David Pescud, and his disabled crew 37 days and 1 hour to complete the sail.
- Phoenicia (a replica of a Phoenician ship); 2009–2010; remade the possible circumnavigation of Africa, but completed the modern trip by going from Syria to the Red Sea via the Suez Canal.
- Børge Ousland in the yacht Northern Passage July–October 2010 and Daniel Gavrilov in the yacht Peter I; June–November 2010; first circumnavigation of the Arctic in a single season. Ousland claims to have crossed his wake north of Bergen on 14 October; it's unclear when Gavrilov crossed his wake.
- Matt Rutherford; June 2011 – April 2012; first single-handed, non-stop 27,000 mi (43,000 km) sailing circumnavigation of the Americas, leaving from the mouth of the Chesapeake Bay, through the Northwest Passage, around Cape Horn, and back to the Chesapeake Bay. The Scott Polar Research Institute officially recognized Rutherford's 27 ft (8.2 m) sailboat as the smallest vessel to ever transit the Northwest Passage.
- Tim Batstone; 1984; first non-stop windsurfing circumnavigation of the British Isles.
- Jonathan Dunnett; June–September 2015; first single-handed and unsupported, non-stop windsurfing circumnavigation of Britain.
- Jonathan Dunnett; May 2017 – May 2019; first single-handed and unsupported, non-stop windsurfing circumnavigation of Europe, from the border of Russia with Norway, to the border between Russia and Ukraine.

== See also ==
- Around the world sailing record
- Circumnavigation world record progression
- List of pedestrian circumnavigators
