= Edward Allcard =

Edward Cecil Allcard
- Born: 31 October 1914; Walton-on-Thames, Surrey, England
- Died: 28 July 2017 (aged 102); La Massana, Andorra
- Occupation(s): naval architect, marine surveyor, yachtsman and author

Edward Cecil Allcard (31 October 1914 – 28 July 2017) was an English naval architect, marine surveyor, yachtsman and author. He was the first person to cross the Atlantic Ocean single-handed in both directions, and wrote several books about his pioneering sailing adventures.

== Biography ==
Born in Walton-on-Thames, Surrey, in 1914, Allcard was educated at Eton College. He went on to take an apprenticeship in the shipbuilding yards of Harland & Wolff, in Glasgow, and later with D & W Henderson, on the Clyde, and qualified as a naval architect before World War II. He was the longest-standing member of the Royal Institution of Naval Architects.

Allcard learned to sail at the age of six, taught by his grandfather's boatman, and owned his first sailing dinghy at the age of 12. Over the course of his life he has owned 18 sailing boats. He made his first single-handed voyage in 1939, sailing from Scotland to Norway and back.

In 1949 Allcard crossed the Atlantic Ocean single-handed, in 81 days, aboard his 35-foot wooden ketch Temptress (previously sailed by Ocean Cruising Club founder Humphrey Barton). Upon completion of his return voyage in 1951, Allcard became the first man in history to sail the Atlantic solo in both directions. During the return crossing, after leaving the Azores, he found a 23-year-old female stowaway aboard his yacht – an event widely reported at the time in the international press. Allcard wrote two books about his single-handed Atlantic crossings: Single-Handed Passage, and Temptress Returns. He appeared as a castaway on the BBC Radio programme Desert Island Discs on 26 July 1955. On a subsequent Atlantic crossing in 1957, Allcard challenged fellow yachtsman Peter Tangvald to what would be the first ever east-to-west single-handed transatlantic race.

Between the years of 1957 and 1973, Allcard completed a protracted solo circumnavigation aboard his 36-foot wooden ketch Sea Wanderer, which he had bought as a derelict hull in New York in 1950 for $250. His book Voyage Alone describes his hundred-day, non-stop run from Antigua, in the West Indies, to the River Plate in southern South America. His subsequent year-long trip around Patagonia, Tierra del Fuego, and Cape Horn is described in his book Solo around Cape Horn – and beyond, published in December 2016, fifty years after this part of his pioneering voyage.

In 1967 Allcard met his future wife, Clare, 31 years his junior. In 1968 they drove from the UK to Singapore in a Land Rover. In 1969 their daughter Kate was born. After Allcard had completed his circumnavigation, the family bought the 69 ft gaff-rigged ex-Baltic trader Johanne Regina, built in 1929. Over the course of the next 30 years they restored the vessel whilst cruising aboard her, from the Caribbean to Europe and then to the Seychelles, and on to spend four years cruising in the Far East before eventually sailing back to Europe.

In 2006, at the age of 91, Allcard sold his last boat, Johanne Regina, to the sail-training organisation "Associació Amics del quetx Ciutat Badalona", and moved ashore to a house in the mountains of Andorra, where he celebrated his 100th birthday in October 2014. Allcard released his last book Solo around Cape Horn – and beyond in late 2016, at the age of 102. It describes his 1966 voyage around Patagonia and Tierra del Fuego, as part of his solo circumnavigation.

Allcard died in La Massana, Andorra, on 28 July 2017, at the age of 102, from complications relating to a broken leg he had suffered some weeks earlier.

== Bibliography ==
- Single-Handed Passage. Norton. 1950.
- Temptress Returns. Putnam. 1952.
- Voyage Alone. Dodd, Mead. 1964.
- Solo around Cape Horn – and beyond... Imperator. 2016. ISBN 978-0-9560722-4-5.
