= Jeanne Socrates =

British yachtswoman

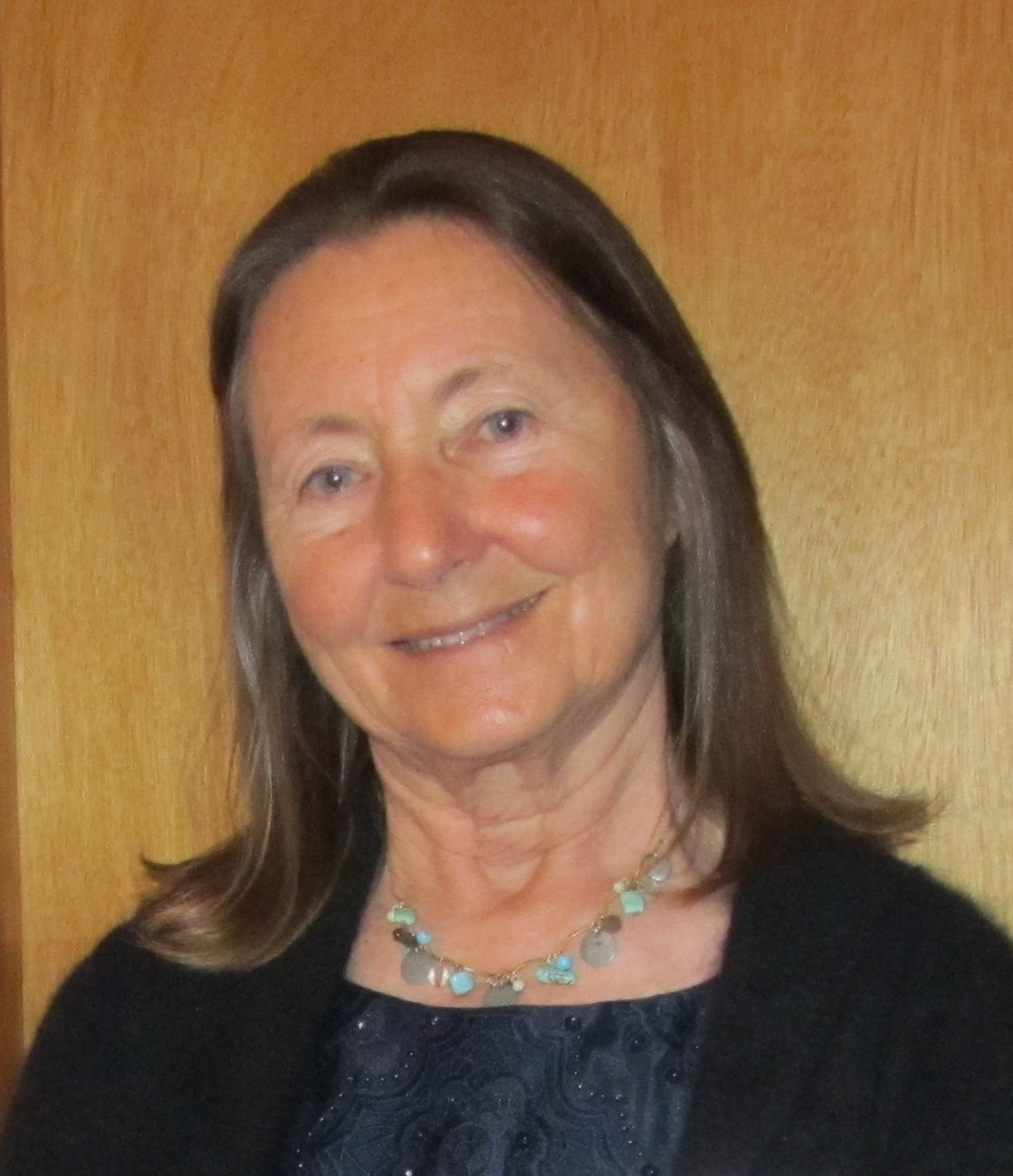
- Born: Jeanne Falkiner; 17 August 1942 (age 83); England, UK
- Citizenship: British
- Occupation: Ocean sailor
- Years active: 1994–
- Known for: Sailing solo nonstop unassisted around the globe
- Spouse: George Socrates (1966-2003)
- Website: www.svnereida.com

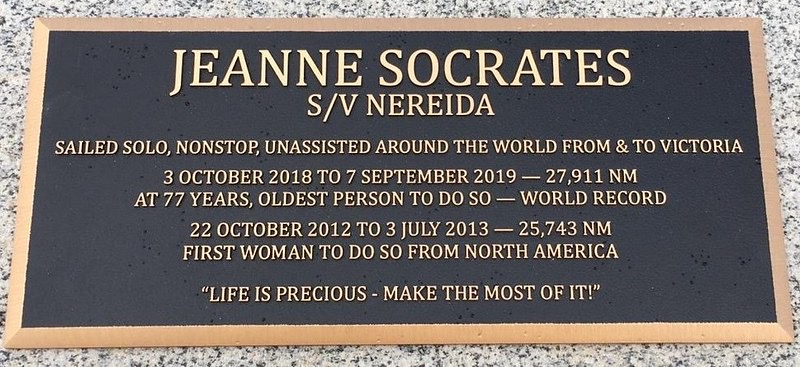

Jeanne Socrates (born 17 August 1942) is a British yachtswoman from Lymington. She holds the record as the oldest female to have circumnavigated the world nonstop single-handed, unassisted and she is the only woman to have circumnavigated solo nonstop from North America.

In 2006, she competed in the Singlehanded TransPac Race from San Francisco to Kauai, receiving their Navigator's Award. In 2013, she was awarded the Cruising Club of America's Blue Water Medal, the Royal Cruising Club Medal for Seamanship and the Ocean Cruising Club's premier award, the Barton Cup.

On 28 September 2017, after major injuries due to a fall from a ladder while working on her yacht Nereida, a 38-foot Najad 380, she postponed a planned attempt to gain the record as the oldest circumnavigator of either sex, then held by Japanese Minoru Saitō who sailed round the world in 2005 at the age of 71.

On 3 October 2018, Socrates started on another attempt to circumnavigate the world singlehandedly, and was the oldest person ever to circumnavigate solo non-stop (aged 77 years) when she completed her voyage on 7 September 2019. On 22 February 2020 she lost this record when the 81-year-old Bill Hatfield completed his solo non-stop circumnavigation, but because Hatfield did not pass south of New Zealand or Tasmania, Socrates remains the oldest person to have sailed round the world "singlehandedly, unassisted and non-stop via the Five Great Capes".

In November 2019, the Greater Victoria Harbour Authority in Victoria, British Columbia, Canada, named the inner harbour commercial dock in Victoria Harbour, which typically handles a million visitors a year, as the "Jeanne Socrates Dock" in honour of her circumnavigation, which started and ended at that harbour.

In December 2019, she received a Special Recognition Award from the CCA In 2020, she was elected Honorary Life Member of the OCC and made Honorary Life Member of the Royal Lymington Yacht Club. In 2020, she was also awarded the Cruising Association's Duchess of Kent Trophy for the second time.

In September 2023, Socrates was inducted into the Cape Horn Hall of Fame in Les Sables d'Olonne, France for her three solo roundings of Cape Horn under sail, two being part of her nonstop, unassisted, singlehanded circumnavigations.
