= HMS New Zealand's 1913 circumnavigation =

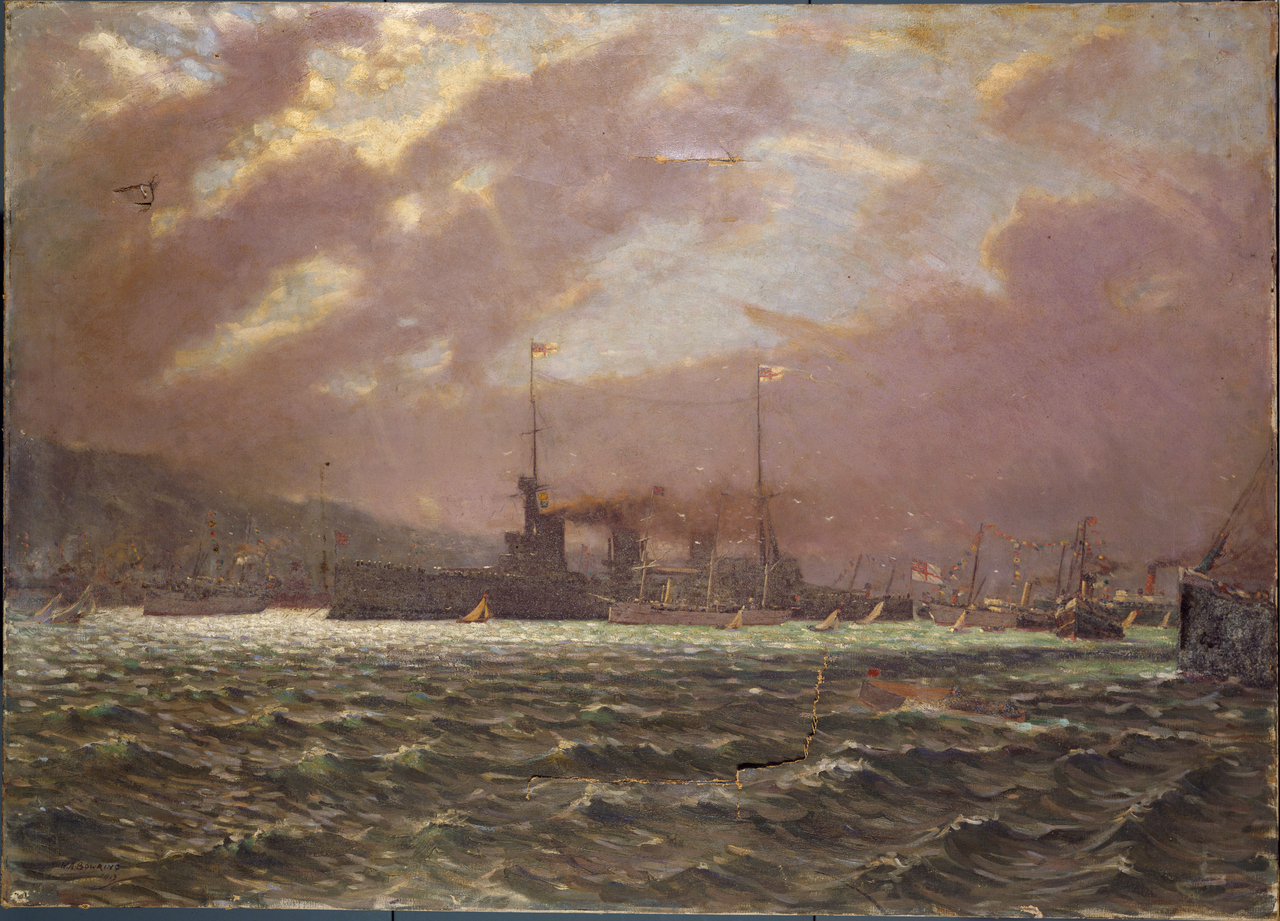
Painting by Walter Armiger Bowring showing the arrival of HMS New Zealand in New Zealand in 1913

HMS New Zealand's 1913 circumnavigation, between 6 February 1913 and 8 December 1913 was the first by a battleship or battlecruiser of the Dreadnought era. The principal objective of the flag-waving cruise was to thank the people of New Zealand for funding the construction of the battlecruiser HMS New Zealand for the Royal Navy.

== Background ==
In March 1909 the government of New Zealand offered to fund the construction of a battleship for the Royal Navy. This offer was subsequently changed at the suggestion of the Admiralty to a battlecruiser, whose keel was laid down in June 1910. By October 1912 HMS New Zealand was beginning her sea trials prior to acceptance in the Royal Navy. The ship was commissioned into the Royal Navy on 19 November 1912.

After the first proposals were made in 1912 for the ship to visit its donor country there was considerable discussion over its duration before a basic nine-month-long itinerary was finalized in the last months of 1912.

The cruise would take in South Africa as passage via the Suez Canal was ruled out of consideration due to a general instruction from the hydrography department of the Admiralty that ships navigating the canal had to draw not more than 28 feet (8.5 m). It was not until May 1913 as a result of loading and trim experiments with HMAS Australia that the necessary calculations were completed for members of the Indefatigable class to be issued with a canal certification.

To facilitate the flag-waving cruise New Zealand was temporarily detached from the 1st Battlecruiser Squadron on 20 January 1913 for the duration of the voyage with Captain Lionel Halsey having independent command. The initial date of departure progressively moved backward into 1913 with the ship finally departing the Royal Navy dockyard at Devonport on 28 January for Portsmouth, which it reached two days later.

Prior to her departure the battlecruiser was visited by King George V (accompanied by Winston Churchill, Sir John Jellicoe, Sir Thomas Mackenzie, Sir Joseph Ward, James Allen (New Zealand's Minister of Finance and Defence) and a number of other high–ranking officials on 5 February 1913.

== The voyage ==
As soon as the King’s party had departed New Zealand took on 800 tons of coal before departing Portsmouth on 6 February. As the battlecruiser headed south it took on coal at St Vincent on 13 February and later at Ascension Island before arriving in Cape Town on 28 February. After further stops at Simon's Town and Durban in South Africa she reached Melbourne, Australia on 2 April to be greeted by the cruiser HMAS Melbourne, destroyers Warrego, Yarra, Parramatta, gunboats Protector and Paluma.

The voyage from Durham had consumed 8,000 tons of coal, leaving only eight tons in her bunkers, though her reserve of 650 tons of oil fuel was still intact. Therefore 3,000 tons of coal transported by the collier Katoa from Westport were soon taken on board, a task which took 20 hours and employed 750 of the crew. With the coal on board the ship now drew too much water to brief alongside a pier so remained moored off Gellibrand Pile lighthouse, where as well as official visitors, some 300 New Zealanders resident in Australia were ferried out to visit her.

=== New Zealand ===
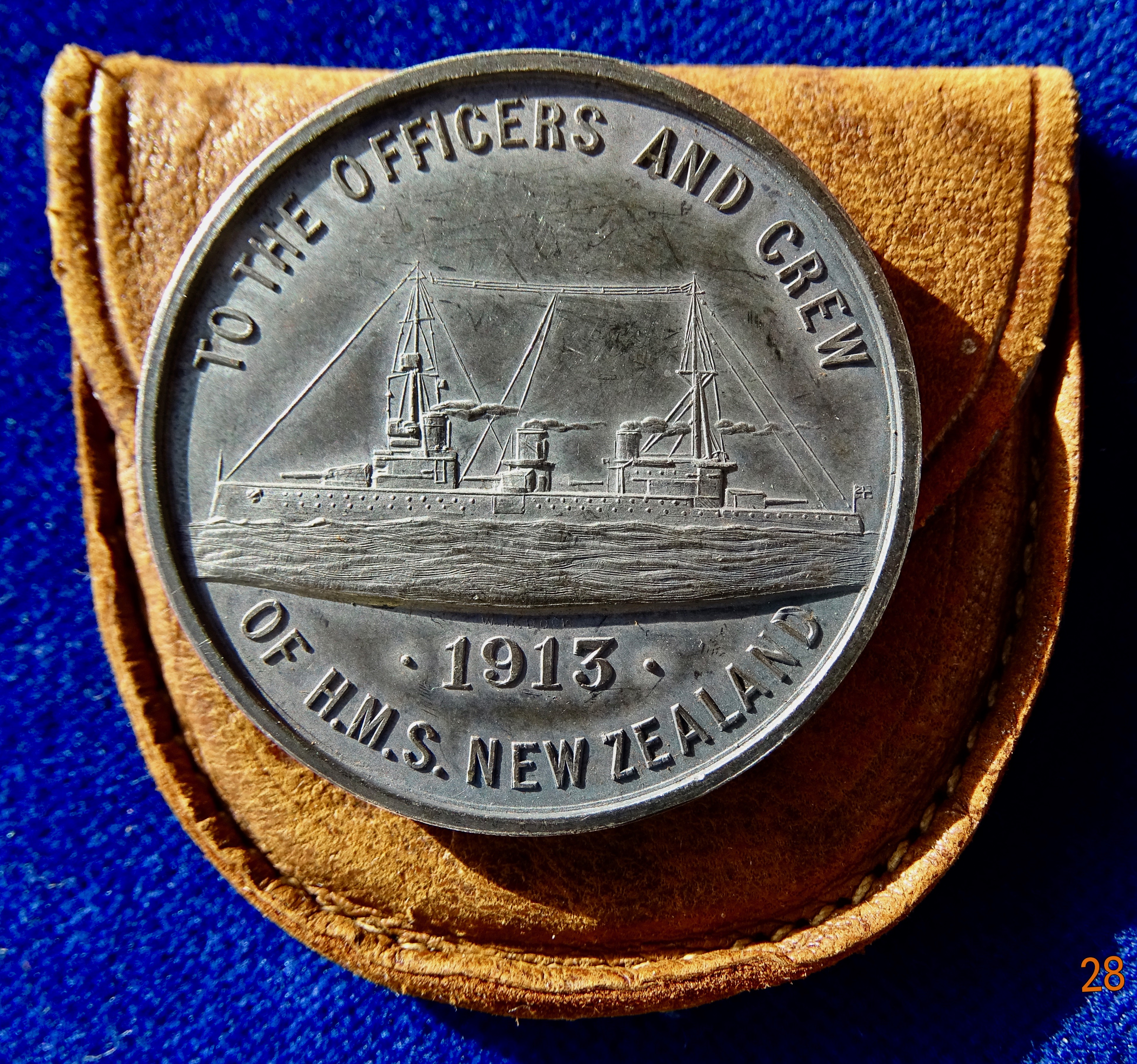
Award medal to the officers and crew of HMS New Zealand during the battleship’s visit to Auckland, obverse

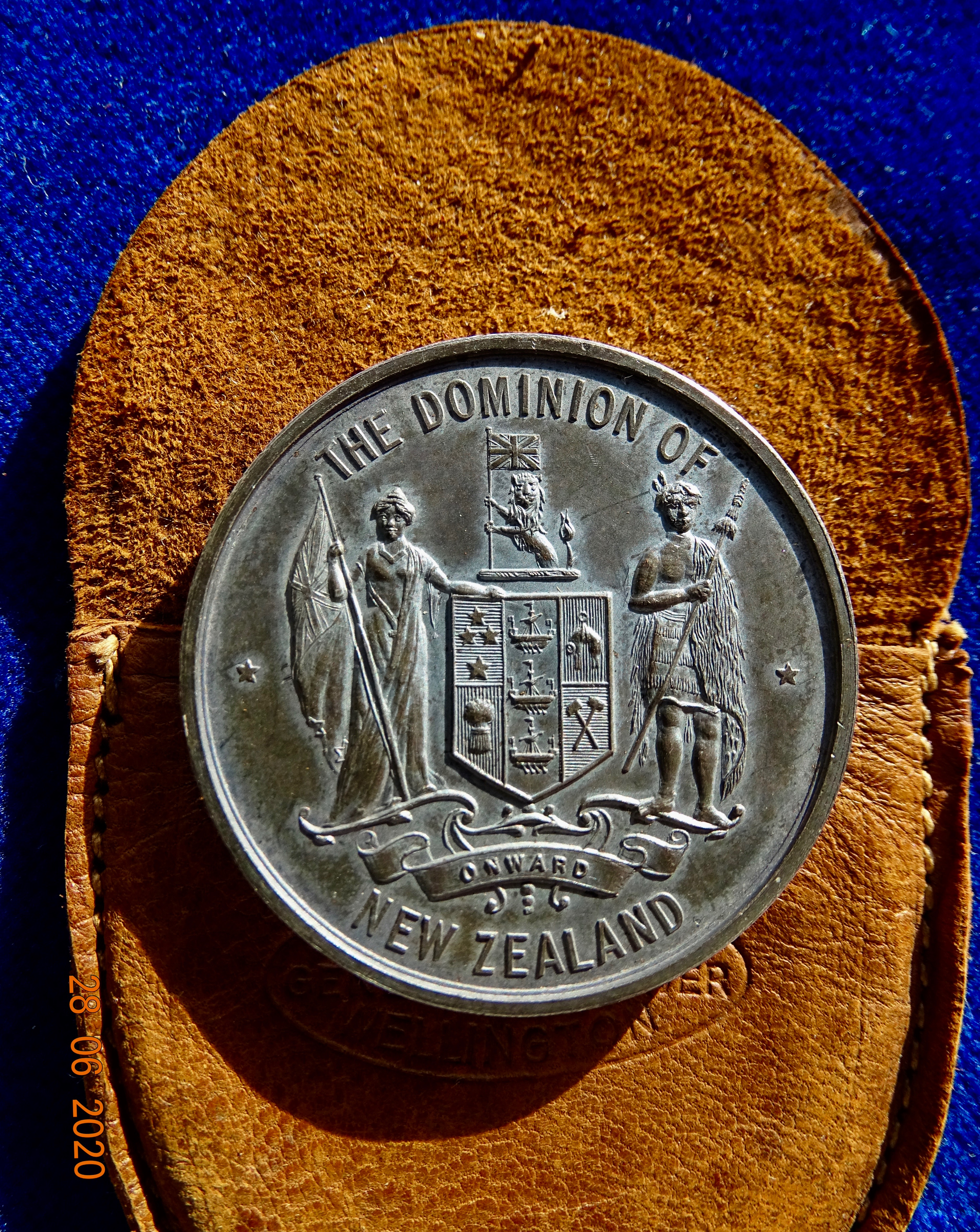
The reverse of this medal presented by the City of Auckland in its special leather pouch

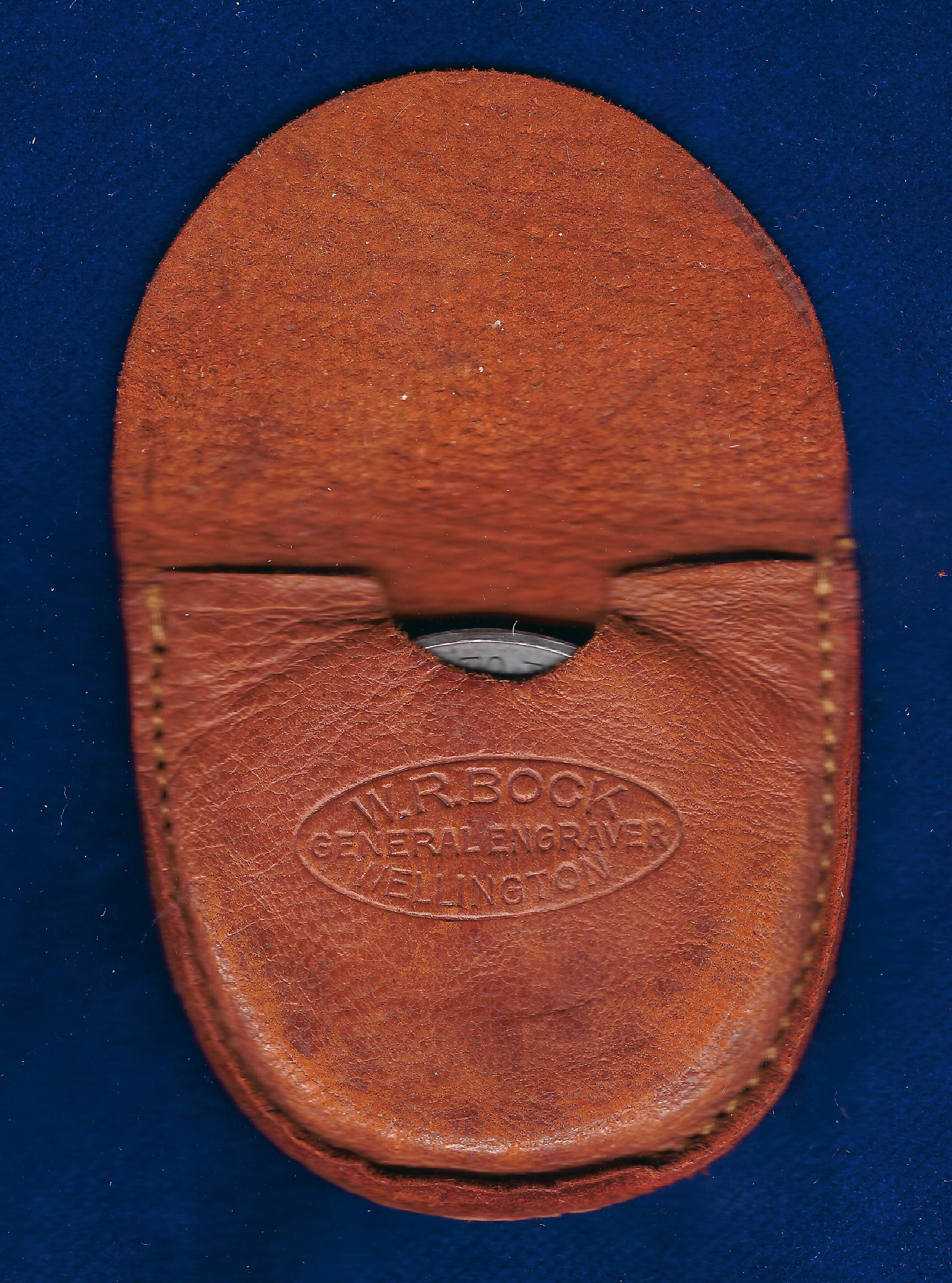
The medal pouch embossed by its Wellington medallist William Rose Bock

New Zealand reached Wellington in New Zealand on 12 April where over the course of her stay in the capital 98,170 citizens visited her, being conveyed out to where she was moored in the harbour by a fleet of steamers. This was the start of an event that gripped the country as thousands of New Zealanders came to catch a sight of and where possible visit "our Dreadnought." For the ship's crew this meant having to attend a constant parade of events and festivities. The ship's detailed itinerary in New Zealand was overseen by Francis Henry Dillon Bell, Minister of Internal Affairs and acting Minister of Marine. The government cable ship Tutanekai was allocated to accompany the battlecruiser around the country and transport people out to the battlecruiser if it drew too deep a draught to dock or safely anchor.

New Zealand departed Wellington on 23 April and proceeded up the east coast of the North Island to visit Napier (25–26 April), Gisborne (27–28 April) and Auckland (29 April–9 May). The battlecruiser then streamed south to visit Lyttelton (13–22 May), Akaroa (24–26 May), where she exercised with HMS Pyramus before continuing on to Timaru (29 May), with a planned stop at Oamaru abandoned due to strong winds. The battlecruiser was too big to safely enter Otago harbour, so it moored at Otago Heads (31 May–1 June). Despite being the harbour of the country’s fourth largest city a strong swell restricted the number of visitors that could board the ship to 3,306. During this stop Halsey was able to travel north by car to Oamaru to unveil a memorial to his friend Robert Falcon Scott. Leaving Otago behind the battlecruiser rounded the South Island visiting Bluff (3 June), Milford Sound (4 June), Greymouth (5–6 June), Westport (7 June), Nelson (8–9 June), Picton (10 June), before stopping again at Wellington and proceeding up the West Coast of the North Island visiting Wanganui (16 June), Russell (19–20 June) and back to Auckland (21–28 June).

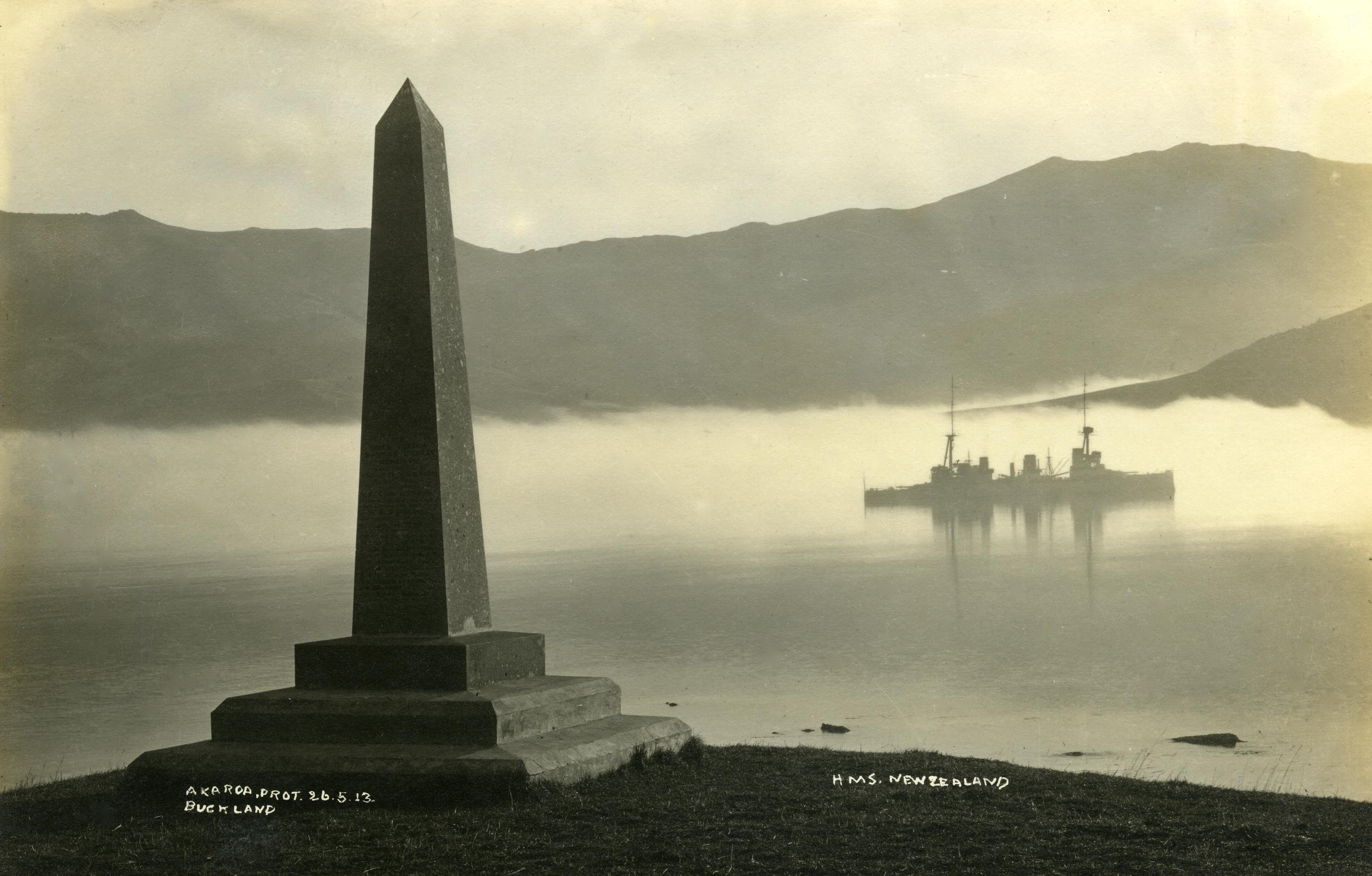
HMS New Zealand in Akaroa Harbour with the Britomart Monument in the foreground

The battlecruiser received numerous gifts while in New Zealand. Of particular note were the gift of two greenstone hei-tiki (pendants), which were intended to ward off evil. and the personal gift to Halsey of a Māori piupiu (a warrior's skirt made from rolled flax).

The ship suffered from a number of desertions while in New Zealand with several absconding while it was in Wellington and another ten absconding in May while it was visiting Auckland. After burning their uniforms two of the Auckland deserters, Edward Waterson and Melvin Reid, found employment as farmhands at Manurewa before they were captured three months later. They then sued the farmer for not paying them each their owed £16 in wages only for the magistrate to dismiss the claim as he felt it was not the courts responsibility to assist deserters.

By the time the battlecruiser departed New Zealand from Auckland at 15:00 on 28 June for Fiji, a total of 376,114 New Zealanders. had visited the vessel during her time in the country, while other sources quote 376,086, 368,118. and 378,068. This number would have been far greater had it not been for the poor weather and heavy seas at many of the roadstead ports that the ship visited which made it difficult for New Zealanders to board the ship. It is estimated that approximately another 125,000 had been able to see the ship either from the shore or from boats. At the time the country had a population of one million. To date the battlecruiser had been 85 days at sea, had steamed 19,216 miles (30,925 km), and had taken on 16,613 tons of coal over the course of nine coaling operations.

=== The Americas ===
The battlecruiser reached Suva in Fiji on 1 July and after a five day stay departed northwards across the Pacific to arrival in Honolulu on 12 July, where 1,930 tons of coal and 289 tons of fuel oil were taken on board to fuel the journey to Canada which was reached on 23 July upon docking at the naval base of Esquimalt on Vancouver Island. While in Canada New Zealand participated in a regatta attended by the ships of the US Navy. However, the regatta was marred by the death of an aviator named Bryan when he fell 300 feet (91 m) to his death after his aircraft broke up during strong winds.

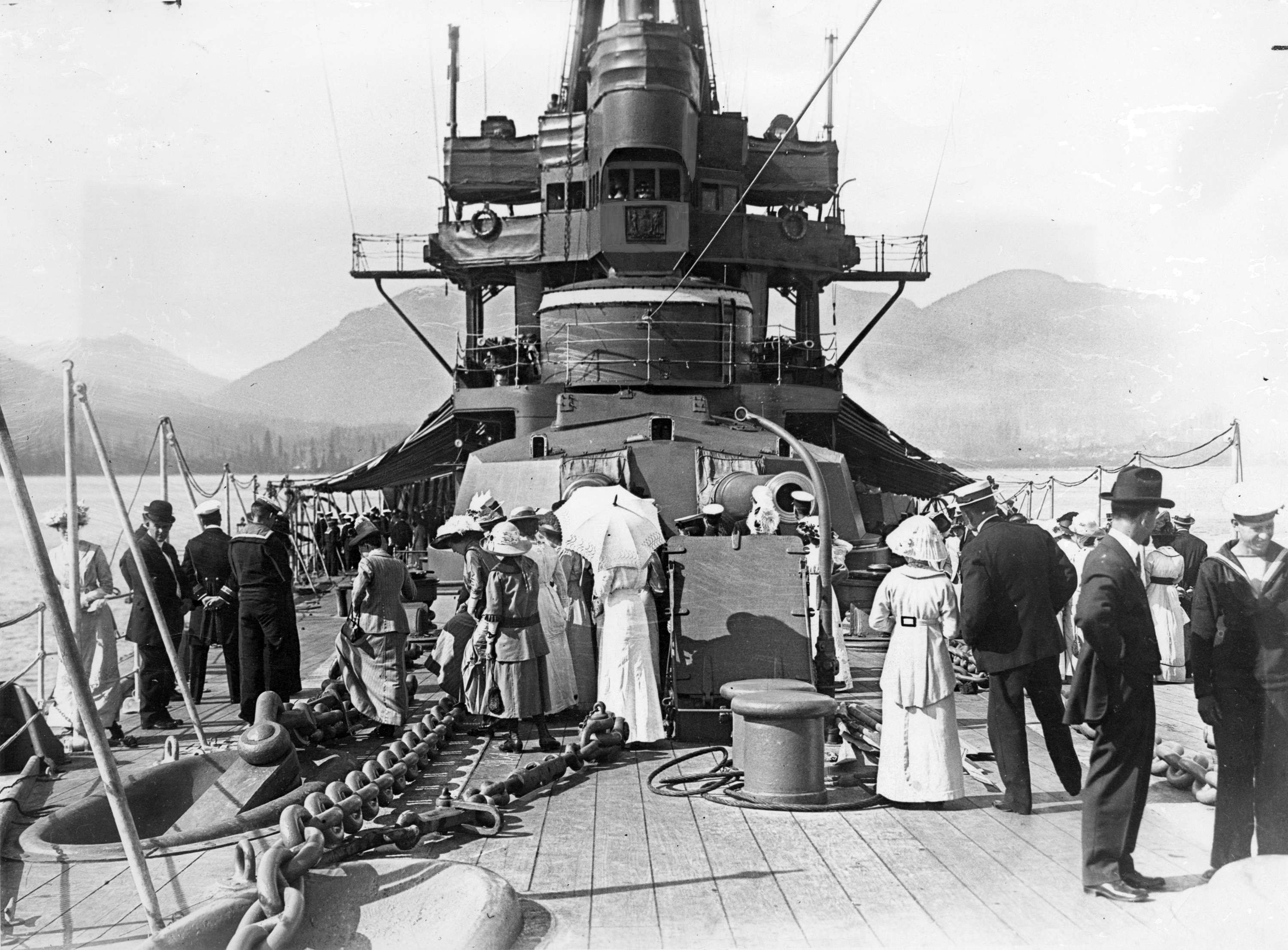
Civilians visit HMS New Zealand at Vancouver 1913

Departing Vancouver on 9 August New Zealand stopped on her way south at Mazatlán (16–18 August) where some 600 Mexicans toured the ship, Acapulco (21–22 August), Salina Cruz (23–25 August), Panama City (reached on 19 August), before reaching Callao in Peru on 8 September.

New Zealand was to spend two months in South America. Wright has identified that the United Kingdom had attached significant importance to this leg of the voyage as it would display the country's naval technology, which had the potential to generate arms sales to Argentina, Brazil and Chile where British shipbuilders were competing against German and the American rivals to equipment their navies.

The next stop Valparaíso was reached on 17 September, then Punta Arenas, before she steamed through the Strait of Magellan and on to Montevideo (3–7 October), Rio de Janeiro (11 October), Trinidad (reached on 27 October, where she was the first warship which have ever taken oil from Trinidad onboard), Dominica (reached on 3 November), Jamaica, Grenada, Bermuda (13–18 November) and finally Halifax, Nova Scotia (21–30 November) before sailing across the Atlantic, to arrive in Portsmouth on 8 December 1913.

New Zealand had sailed 45,320 mi (72,940 km), consumed 31,833 tons of coal and had been visited by 500,151 people, having completed what was to date the longest voyage by a vessel of the dreadnought era. As well as gaining valuable operational experience through the tour the officers attended 75 dances and were made members of 150 clubs.

== Second circumnavigation ==
New Zealand completed a second circumnavigation between 31 February 1919 and 3 February 1920 when it was used to transport Admiral John Jellicoe on his review of the naval defences of India, Australia, New Zealand and Canada. This voyage was considerably shorted at 33,514 nautical miles (62,068 km; 38,567 mi) as it used the Panama Canal to transit between the Pacific and Atlantic Oceans.

The next circumnavigation by a capital ship of the Royal Navy was that by HMS Hood, HMS Repulse, and the rest of the Special Service Squadron in 1923–24.

== See also ==
- List of circumnavigations

== Bibliography ==
- Burt, R. A. (1986). British Battleships of World War One (Hardcover) (2012 ed.). Barnsley, England: Seaforth Publishing. ISBN 978-1-84832-147-2.
- Wright, Matthew J. (2021). The Battlecruiser New Zealand: A Gift to Empire. Annapolis, Maryland: Naval Institute Press. ISBN 978-1-5267-8403-2. OCLC 1206393324.
