= Robert DeLaurentis (aviator) =

American aviator and businessman

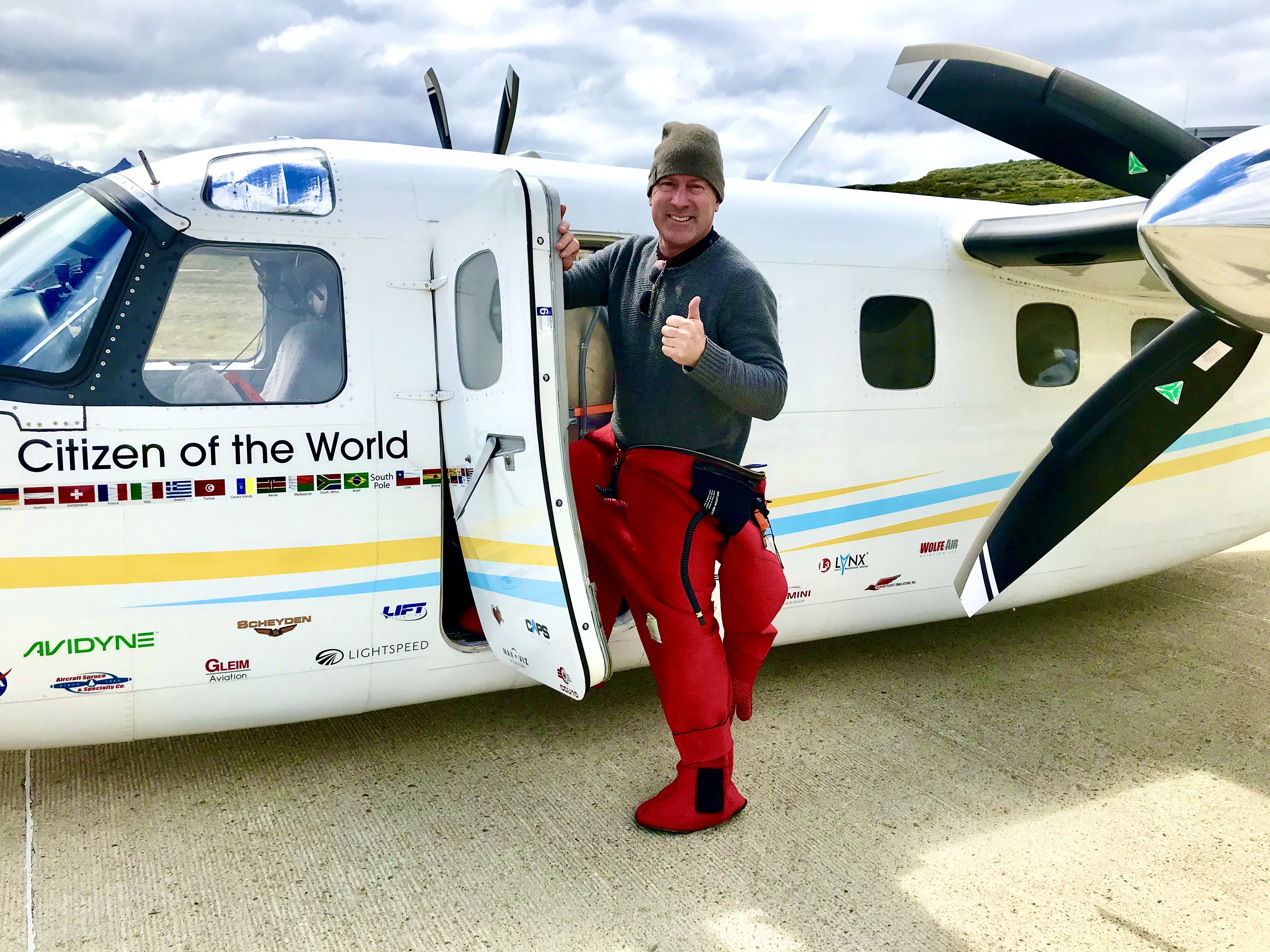
- Born: January 11, 1966 (age 60); Salamanca, New York
- Education: University of Southern California
- Occupations: Pilot; Author
- Known for: Circumnavigation
- Notable work: Two-time solo circumnavigator
- Parent(s): Robert DeLaurentis; Frances DeLaurentis (deceased)
- Call sign: N29GA (FAA)
- Website: flyingthrulife.com

Robert DeLaurentis (born January 11, 1966) is an American aviator, businessman, and author. He was the first solo pilot to fly a Piper Malibu Mirage, a small, single-engine plane, around the world from May 17, 2015, to August 14, 2015. The flight covered 26,000 nautical miles and 23 countries in 98 days for a fundraising campaign to support aviation programs. On August 10, 2020, DeLaurentis completed a 9-month, 26,000–nautical mile polar circumnavigation and global peace mission, "One Planet, One People, One Plane: Oneness for Humanity" in his modified 1983 aircraft named "Citizen of the World".

== Early life and education ==
DeLaurentis was born in Salamanca, New York, moved to the San Francisco Bay Area, then Indonesia, then finally settled in San Diego, California. Following an undergraduate degree in accounting from USC, he earned an advanced graduate degree in spiritual psychology from the University of Santa Monica. From 1989 to 2006, DeLaurentis served in the United States Navy, achieving rank of lieutenant commander. In 1995, following his Navy career, he founded a real estate development company, Innorev Enterprises, Inc., with projects throughout San Diego.

== Career ==
=== 2015 circumnavigation ===
DeLaurentis decided to attempt to fly solo around the world to raise awareness and funding for programs at Lindbergh–Schweitzer Elementary and AOPA (Aircraft Owners and Pilots Association) Flight Training Scholarship Program by the name "The Spirit of San Diego". He was testing new aviation technology to make aviation more affordable and safer. Departing Lindbergh Field, San Diego, California, in the single engine Piper Malibu Mirage named "Spirit of San Diego" on May 17, 2015, DeLaurentis covered 26,000 nautical miles and 23 countries in 98 days.

=== 2019–2020 pole-to-pole circumnavigation ===
On his second circumnavigation, DeLaurentis used a modified 1983 Turbine Commander 900 twin-engine plane he named "Citizen of the World". The COVID-19 pandemic turned the planned five-month pole-to-pole peace mission into a nine-month mission.

Showcasing and promoting 95 sponsors from around the world, "Citizen of the World’s" polar circumnavigation including many national partners and local San Diego aviation and communication technology businesses that serviced and supported the aircraft and pilot in flying the longest distance in a twin-engine or single-engine turboprop—18.1 hours in flight—and becoming the first and fastest polar circumnavigation in the world in a twin-engine or single-engine turboprop.

Following two initial departure delays due to issues with new technology installations in the aircraft, DeLaurentis departed from San Diego County's Gillespie Field on November 17, 2019, with the intention of crossing the South Pole and then the North Pole before returning home. DeLaurentis stopped in 22 different countries along the way, interviewing NGO leaders and local residents for an upcoming documentary, "Peace Pilot: To the Ends of the Earth and Beyond".

== Bibliography ==
DeLaurentis has authored the books "Flying Thru Life: How to Grow Your Business and Relationships with Applied Spirituality", "Zen Pilot: Flight of Passion and the Journey Within", and the children's book "The Little Plane That Could". His next book, "Peace Pilot: To the Ends of the Earth and Beyond", will be released in 2021.

== See also ==
- List of circumnavigations
