= Karen Thorndike =

Karen Thorndike, born in Snohomish, Washington in 1942, holds the Guinness record as the first American woman to sail solo around the world without assistance. Her voyage was 33,000 miles, which she started at age 53 completed in 1998 in a 36-foot yacht named Amelia after Amelia Earhart. The trip took her two years and two weeks, but was not done continuously; for example, she had a three-month hospitalization for angina pectoris after her trip began.

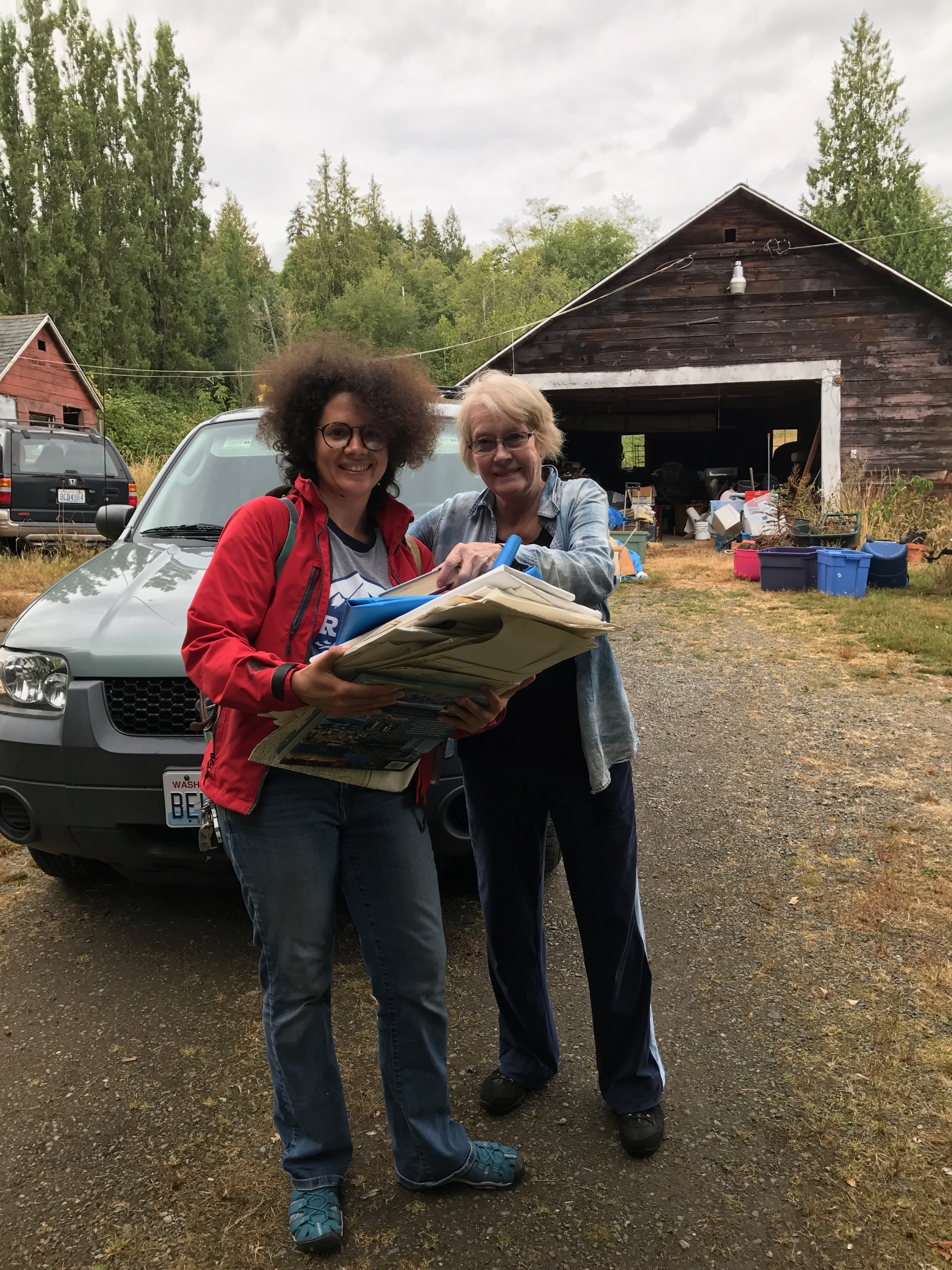
Karen Thorndike (right) donates the charts from her circumnavigation to a young woman solo sailor (left).

Her interest in sailing began in the early 1980s. Thorndike took some sailing lessons, began racing and was soon delivering boats from Hawaii to Seattle. During one of those trips, her dream of circumnavigating began to take shape. However, when she confided in a crew member and friend about her plans, he told her, “That’s impossible. You have no idea what you’d be getting yourself into.” After that, Thorndike kept her plans to herself until she bought her boat. During her around-the-world trip she also sailed around the five great capes. This is what qualified her for the Guinness. Tania Aebi had previously been recognized as the first American woman to sail around the world alone in 1987, but the recognition was unofficial. Guinness did not recognize her trip for two reasons: first, she went through the Panama Canal, which required assistance. Second, she sailed with a friend for eighty miles while in the South Pacific.

Due to Karen's achievement she was interviewed for the book The Heart of Success: Conversations with Notable Achievers by Dan G. Tripps. In 1999 she was awarded the Cruising Club of America's Blue Water Medal. She also received a Guinness World Records certificate acknowledging her accomplishment.

Thorndike is still alive and resides in Washington state.
