= Bill Hatfield =

Australian engineer and sailor (born 1939)

William Hatfield (born 14 January 1939) is an Australian retired engineer and fisherman who on 22 February 2020, at the age of 81, became the oldest person to have successfully sailed solo, non-stop and unassisted around the Earth.

Hatfield simultaneously set the speed record for a person sailing single-handedly westbound around the world in a vessel of under 40 feet (12 m) in length.

== Early life and career ==
Hatfield was born on 14 January 1939 and grew up in the Cairns area and later around Sydney. When he was 15 he moved to Paddington, New South Wales, and worked at a boat yard in Rushcutters Bay. He studied civil engineering and after graduating worked on construction projects around Sydney, as well as in Papua New Guinea and Gladstone.

In 1972 he bought a yacht and began to sail and explore various locations around the Southern Hemisphere. He later bought a fishing trawler and started a fishing business.

== Shipwreck with family ==
In February 1981 Hatfield was aboard his fishing trawler with his partner Barbara Braddock and their two young daughters when they encountered Tropical Cyclone Cliff 150 miles (240 km) off the Queensland coast. With the storm intensifying, they were soon forced to abandon ship. Braddock and their children escaped on the boat's life raft, but Hatfield was unable to join them since the raft immediately disappeared from view in the high waves. He managed to release and board the trawler's dinghy, and searched for the raft following the direction in which it had seemed to drift before disappearing. Eventually he sighted the raft and found it floating upside down, but found Braddock clutching the two girls underneath it. Despite having no food or water, the four managed to survive the cyclone and after two and half days adrift they were rescued by a passing Japanese coal carrier bound for Newcastle.

== Previous circumnavigation attempts ==
Hatfield had embarked on three separate failed unassisted single-handed non-stop circumnavigation attempts before his final successful voyage.

According to Guinness World Records, "[Hatfield] made the first of three unsuccessful attempts in 2015. He was washed overboard during that first voyage, struck by a vicious storm during his next attempt in 2016 and faced insurmountable difficulties in rounding Cape Horn in 2017, forcing him to abort."

== Circumnavigation ==
Then-eighty-year-old Hatfield departed Brisbane, Queensland, on 8 June 2019 in his 11.5-metre (38 ft) sloop L'Eau Commotion on a westabout course – against the prevailing winds – sailing via the Bass Strait, the Cape of Good Hope, the Azores, and Cape Horn. He returned to Brisbane eight months later, on 22 February 2020 at the age of 81, breaking the previous age record held by British sailor Jeanne Socrates, who had completed her solo non-stop unassisted circumnavigation on 7 September 2019, at the age of 77.

Since Hatfield's circumnavigation was in the more challenging westabout direction, he simultaneously set a non-age-related record, confirmed by the World Sailing Speed Record Council (WSSRC), for fastest single-handed westbound circumnavigation in a vessel of under 40 feet (12 m) in length: 258 days, 22 hours, 24 minutes, and 9 seconds.

== See also ==
- Robin Knox-Johnston, completed the first (eastabout) single-handed non-stop unassisted circumnavigation
