= Humphrey Barton =

English yachtsman

- Born: 1900
- Died: 1980 (aged 79–80)
- Other name: Humphrey "Hum" Barton
- Occupation: Yachtsman

Humphrey "Hum" Barton (1900–1980) was an English yachtsman who was influential in the development of deep-sea cruising in the 1950s and 1960s. He is best known as the founder of the Ocean Cruising Club. He was an author who wrote books about some of his voyages.

== Biography ==
Humphery Barton, also known as Hum, was born in 1900. At age 18, towards the end of the First World War, he enlisted with the Royal Flying Corps and became a qualified pilot, training in Sopwith Dolphins and Sopwith Pups, though the war had ended before he was deployed. Whilst working as a cable layer, he bought his first sailing dinghy in 1922, before upgrading to a sloop.

Barton married Jessie in 1931, and the couple had twins in 1934, with the family living in Lymington. At the outbreak of the Second World War, Barton became a major and Deputy Commander of Royal Engineers, based in Scotland. He spent most of his free time sailing and racing boats. In 1950, Barton and his friend, Kevin O'Riordan, sailed across the Atlantic in a record 47 days, by using a direct route, in the sloop Vertue XXXV.

In 1954, he would become the founder and first commodore of Ocean Cruising Club. Barton's wife, Jessie, died in 1959. He was also influential in the development of deep-sea cruising during this period.

In 1970, Barton would marry again, this time to Mary Danby, another keen sailor. Danby was born in Australia, and the couple met in Malta, where they would eventually settle down, when they were not living on their 36-foot (11 m) yacht, The Rose Rambler. The couple married in Antigua.

Barton died in 1980.

== Bibliography ==
Over the years, Barton would write books about his more interesting voyages including:

- Vertue XXXV. HarperCollins Distribution Services. ISBN 9780246637925. (known as Westward Crossing in the United States)
- The Sea and Me. R. Ross/ Harrap. ASIN B0007IYFAQ.
- Atlantic Adventures. Adlard Coles. ASIN B000QYIF0W.
