= Ravinder Bansal =

First person of Indian origin to fly solo around the world in a single engine plane

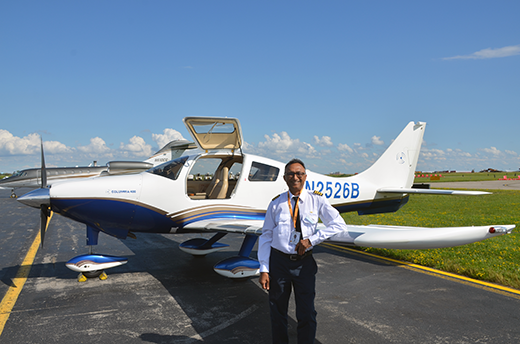
- Born: 26 February 1949 (age 77); Ambala, India
- Occupations: Entrepreneur and aviator
- Known for: First person of Indian origin to fly solo around the world in a single engine plane.
- Spouse: Pratibha Bansal
- Awards: Upstate New York Entrepreneur of the Year; 1993; Walter P. Cooke Award; 2009; State University of New York Honorary Doctorate of Science; 2022
- Aviation career
- Famous flights: Solo Global Circumnavigation 4 July – 20 August 2017

Ravinder Bansal (born 26 February 1949), is an Indian American entrepreneur, philanthropist, and amateur pilot from Clarence, New York. He was the first person of Indian origin to fly around the world solo in a single engine plane.

== Early life and education ==
Bansal was born in Ambala, India in 1949 to an Agarwal family. His father, Dr. Chatar Muni Bansal, was a private physician in Kasauli, India. He did his early schooling in Kasauli before moving to Ambala to attend S.D. College. He completed a PhD in Mechanical Engineering at the Georgia Institute of Technology from 1974 to 1977. While studying at Georgia Tech, he also learned how to fly and received his pilot's license in 1977.

== Career ==
Bansal was recruited by Linde and moved to the Buffalo, NY area in 1977. He co-founded a medical and industrial oxygen concentrator company, AirSep Corporation, in Amherst, NY in 1987 and served as CEO until its acquisition. For his work at AirSep, he was awarded the 1993 Entrepreneur of the Year award in Upstate New York. AirSep was also awarded the U.S. Department of Commerce's Export Achievement Award in 2002. At its peak, AirSep employed 700 people and had $110 million in revenue in 2006. AirSep was acquired by Chart Industries in 2012 for $170 million.

Bansal was awarded the Walter P. Cooke Award in 2009 from the State University of New York at Buffalo for his philanthropic contributions.

Bansal was awarded a State University of New York Honorary Doctorate of Science on 21 May 2022 for his accomplishments as an entrepreneur, humanitarian and researcher.

== Circumnavigation ==
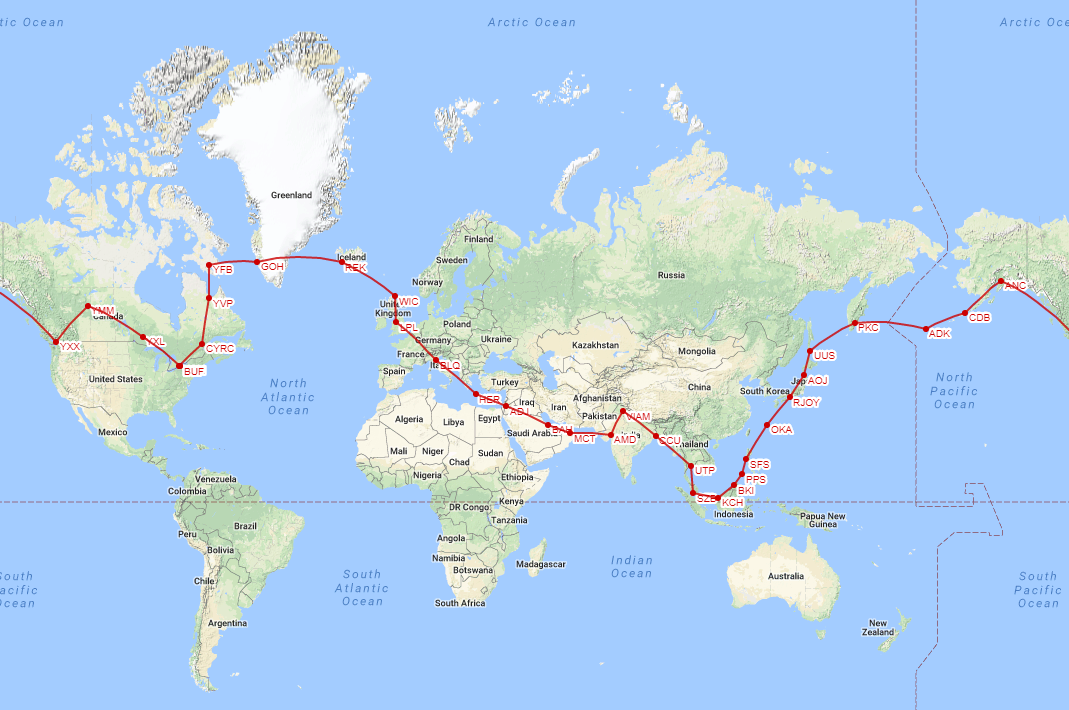
Ravinder Bansal's Solo Circumnavigation Route

In August 2017, Bansal completed a solo circumnavigation of the globe in an airplane with a single, reciprocating engine, becoming the first person of Indian origin to do so. Bansal departed on his circumnavigation from Buffalo, NY, USA on 4 July 2017, and returned 47 days later on 20 August 2017. He completed his circumnavigation in his own Cessna 400 single-engine piston aircraft. His trip consisted of 36 stops in 19 countries and covered a total distance of 21,738 nautical miles with a cumulative flight time of 135.9 hours. The flight required six months of preparation with his logistics team of Eddie Gold and Ahmed Hassan at GASE.

Bansal, inspired by the passing of his sister-in-law to complications from breast cancer, set out to raise awareness and money with his circumnavigation mission for the Rotary Cancer Hospital in his hometown of Ambala. As of August 2017, the mission had raised $160,000 towards the purchase of an MRI machine to allow for early detection of cancer at the hospital.

Bansal was recognized for becoming the first person of Indian origin to fly solo around the world by the Limca Book of Records in its 2020 edition. The State of New York Legislature of the County of Erie recognized Bansal for his record solo flight and efforts in the fight against cancer by passing a resolution on 7 September 2017.

Bansal published a book in 2019, Cleared Direct Destination, detailing his solo circumnavigation mission.
