= Tania Aebi =

American sailor

- Born: October 7, 1966 (age 59)
- Occupations: Sailor, writer
- Known for: Held the record as the youngest person and first American woman to sail solo around the world (with stops and assistance)
- Spouse: Olivier Berner (former)
- Website: www.taniaaebi.com

Tania Aebi (born October 7, 1966) is an American sailor. She completed a solo circumnavigation of the globe in a 26-foot sailboat between the ages of 18 and 21, finishing it in 1987, making her the first American woman and the youngest person (at the time) to sail around the world. Her record was not recognized by Guinness, because she sailed through the Panama Canal, which required assistance. She also sailed eighty miles with a friend in the South Pacific. (For the first American woman to attain the relevant Guinness World Record, see Karen Thorndike.) Despite many challenges, Aebi accomplished her goal.

== Voyage ==
Aebi did not take much of a sailing background on her voyage. In 1984, when Aebi was sixteen, just before finishing up with an alternative high-school a year early, her father bought a boat in the UK to sail it back across the Atlantic to New York City. Aebi went with him and in a course of a year they sailed from the UK to Spain, Portugal, Morocco, the Canary Islands, the Caribbean, Bermuda and the whole group of Islands, heading back to New York City and arriving there in 1985. They did so as novices.

During a year-long trip from England to New York City with her father, Aebi learned the basics of sailing.

In May 1985, before the circumnavigation, Aebi took a correspondence course in celestial navigation.

Aebi had practically no sailing or navigation experience when she departed on her journey, on May 28, 1985. She was eighteen years old when she departed. Aebi did not have a GPS receiver because civilian GPS receivers were unavailable. Instead, Aebi had a sextant for celestial navigation and a radio direction finder. She used the first leg of her trip from New Jersey to Bermuda as a sea trial of her boat.

== Reactions ==
Hearing of her father's round-the-world offer, many sailors accused Ernst Aebi of taking a cavalier attitude toward his daughter's safety, to which he responded:

I didn't feel it was irresponsible. It's a lot less risky to be on the ocean than to be hanging out in bars at 4 a.m. on the Lower East Side like she used to do.

== Boat ==
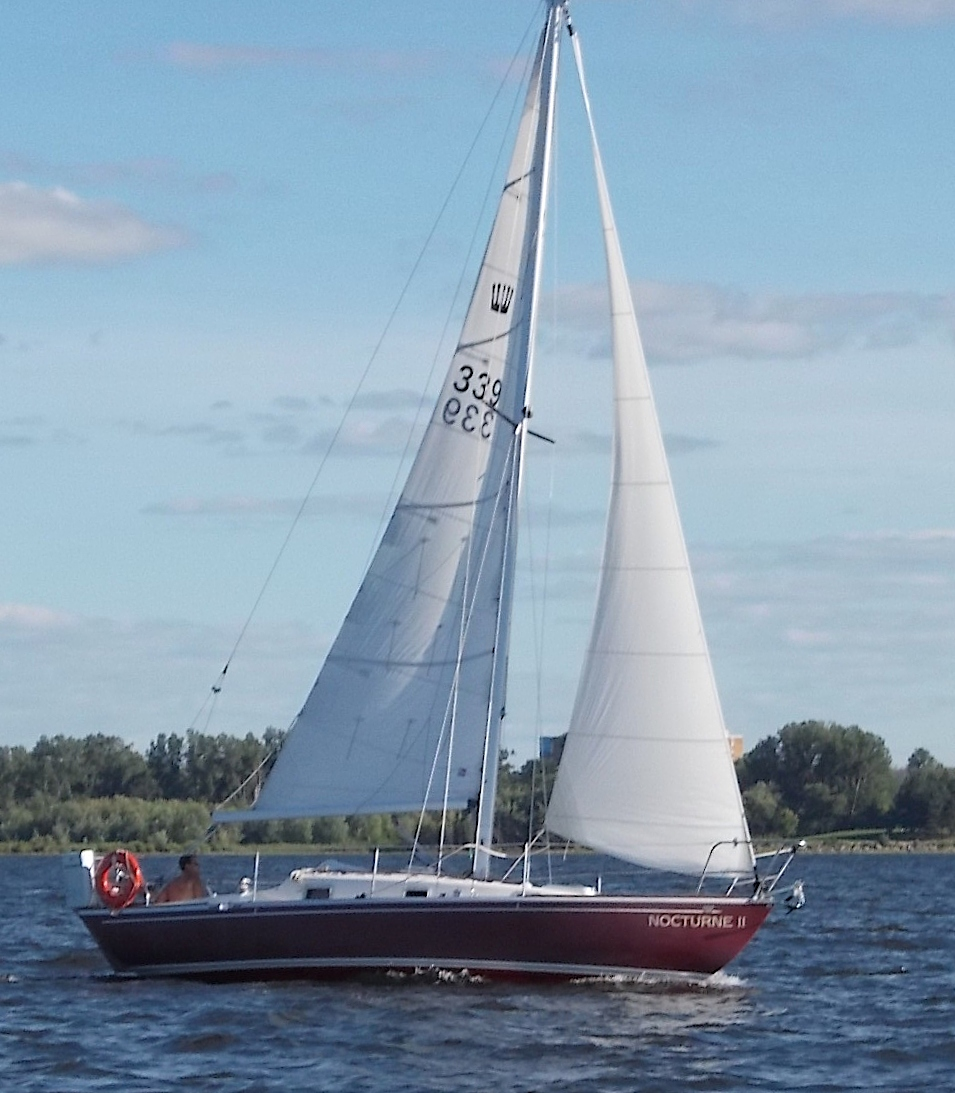
Aebi sailed a Taylor 26 when she became the youngest woman to single-handedly circumnavigate the globe.

Aebi set out on her circumnavigation in her $40,000 sloop, Varuna, on May 28, 1985, her only other sailing experience being a six-month cruise of the Atlantic she had made with her father, her two sisters and her brother. Varuna was called so after a Vedic deity associated with sky, waters, justice and truth. The boat was a Taylor 26, a Canadian version of Contessa 26, which cost $40,000. Aebi's arrival back in New York City on November 6, 1987, after a cold November, transit across the Atlantic on Varuna was heralded nationally by the news media.

Upon Aebi's arrival in New York on Varuna, President Reagan sent Aebi a message saying:

You set your energy and youth against an ancient challenge on the ageless seas, and you triumphed.

=== Global circumnavigation route ===
In May 1985, with only few months of limited sailing experience, Aebi sailed away from a New York City dock, bound for Bermuda in her small boat. In November 1987 Aebi returned to New York City.

== Sponsorship ==
Aebi's journey was sponsored in part by Cruising World magazine, for which she had written articles.

After Aebi's return from her 3-year long voyage, Cruising World magazine commented:

"When anybody that young departs on an adventure that dangerous and does it successfully, it is an example to us all."

== Later activities ==
Tarzoon, the cat who traveled more than half the world around with Aebi, survived for more than 20 years and died peacefully in its sleep just before she was to undertake a new voyage with her two teenage sons in 2008. She and her sons sailed a newly acquired steel monohull across the Caribbean and South Pacific during 2008. Aebi traded off with the boys' father, her ex-husband Olivier Berner, in Papeete, Tahiti. Olivier and his sons continued their cruising passage from there.

== Notable works ==
=== As author ===
Aebi recounts the story of her solo-circumnavigation in her book Maiden Voyage which became a bestseller in the United States in 1989. The book is a story of teenage angst, self-discovery and adventure. Aebi's story is unusual because she was, by many standards, poorly prepared for her voyage. But she prevailed through common sense, skills she both learned and honed underway, as well as a strong sense of determination.

==== Recent work ====
In 2005 Aebi published her second book, I've Been Around.

=== As editor ===
Aebi writes monthly columns for several sailing and cruising magazines.

== In popular culture ==
In September 2017 it was announced that Aebi's memoir Maiden Voyage will be adapted into a film, with the working title of Girl at Sea. The adaptation was bought by Cohen Media Group in 2017 with the film script written by screenwriter Joel Silverman.

== Books ==
- Tania Aebi; Bernadette Brennan (1989). Maiden Voyage. Ballantine Books. ISBN 0-345-41012-2.
- Tania Aebi (2005). I've Been Around. Sheridan House. ISBN 1-57409-213-8.

== See also ==
- List of youth solo sailing circumnavigations
- List of female explorers and travelers
