= Ocean Cruising Club =

- Ocean Cruising Club Burgee
- Full name: Ocean Cruising Club
- Short name: OCC
- Founded: 1954; 72 years ago
- Location: United Kingdom
- Focus: Long-distance cruising
- Website: www.oceancruisingclub.org

The Ocean Cruising Club (OCC) is an international club for cruisers. Members are identified by a distinctive blue and yellow burgee with a stylized Flying Fish on the blue part of the flag.

Founded in 1954 by the late Humphrey Barton after his east–west crossing of the Atlantic in the 25 foot Vertue XXXV, the club exists to promote long-distance cruising in all its forms. The club, administered from the UK, has no premises, regarding the oceans of the world as its clubhouse, although it enjoys visitors' rights with a number of major clubs worldwide. Membership is about what the applicant has done rather than who they are. Membership is open to anyone either as skipper, or certified as competent by the skipper, who has completed a continuous ocean passage of at least 1000 miles, measured along the rhumb line, in a vessel of no more than 70 feet in overall length. Those aspiring to cross oceans may join as associate members.

The Ocean Cruising Club maintains a network of over 200 Port Officers worldwide to assist members in their undertakings. The OCC publishes the journal Flying Fish twice a year and a quarterly newsletter. Much published material is available for non-members to review on the OCC website. This material includes the archive of the journal Flying Fish published since 1991 covering first hand experience of cruises over most of the navigable waters of the earth. The club also sponsors a forum for exchange of cruising information by members. In addition, the club maintains a Facebook page for members, and an open presence on Twitter and Instagram. The OCC gives out several annual awards for notable accomplishments in ocean sailing, and offers a Mentoring Programme as well as a Youth Sponsorship Programme.
