= Badhwar =

Badhwar is a surname. Notable people with the surname include:

- Fateh Chand Badhwar (1900–1995), Indian civil servant
- Inderjit Badhwar (born 1943), Indian journalist, novelist and the former editor of India Today
- Natasha Badhwar (born 1971), Indian author, columnist, filmmaker, journalist and a media trainer
- Neera K. Badhwar, Indian philosopher and professor emeritus of philosophy at the University of Oklahoma
- Viraat Badhwar (born 1995), Indian-Australian amateur golfer from Queensland, Australia

== See also ==
- Badhwar Park, residential complex
