= First Indian circumnavigation =

1985–1987 sailing voyage by the Indian Army Corps of Engineers

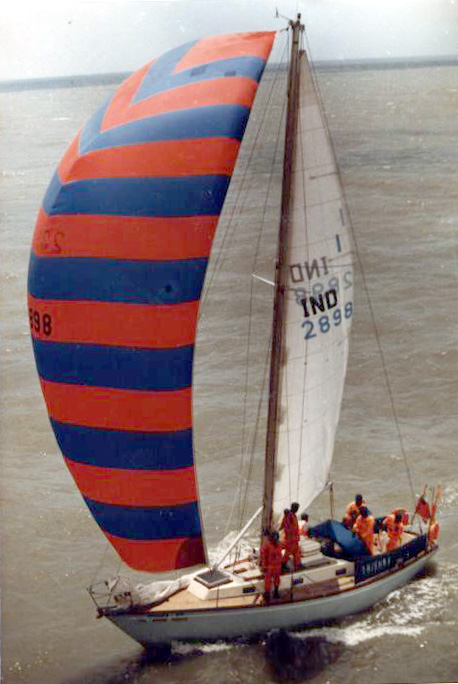
Trishna training in Bombay harbour-Sep 1985

The first Indian circumnavigation in a sail boat was undertaken in 1985–1987 by a team comprising officers of the Indian Army Corps of Engineers on yacht Trishna, a 1970-vintage Swan 37 sloop.

Trishna was given the singular honour thereafter of being transported to New Delhi and displayed on a tableau during the Republic Day Parade, 1987.

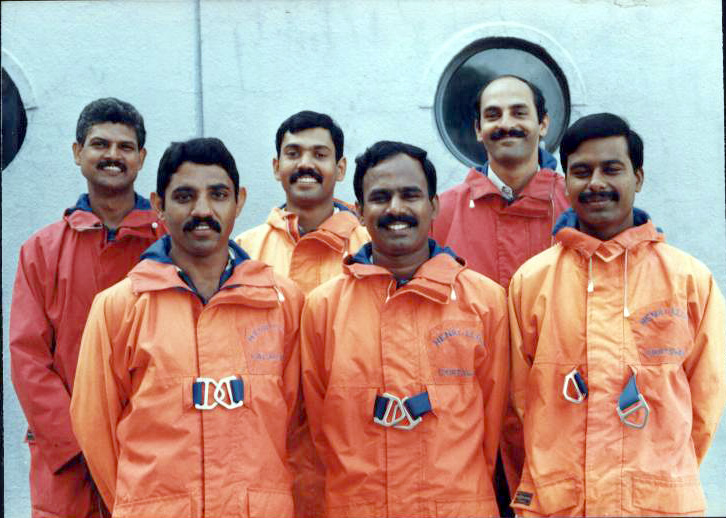
The sail-off crew members

== Prelude ==
The country's first voyage in a sailboat to foreign shores was conducted on the 20-foot Seabird 'Albatross' in 1977 by the Indian Army Engineers as a trial for the ultimate goal of circumnavigating the globe. The 68-day 7,000 km Seabird voyage to the Persian Gulf port of Bandar Abbas, Iran, was one of the early major ventures by the Corps.

On 28 September 1985 Trishna set sail from the Naval Sailing Club jetty at Colaba, Mumbai with General Arun Shridhar Vaidya, then-Chief of Army Staff accompanied by Lt. Gen. P.R. Puri, Engineer-in-Chief flagging off the First Indian Expedition Around the World.

== Team ==
The team consisted of ten members, with six on the boat at any one time, of which four were permanent crew:

- Maj K. S. Rao, SC, SM, - Skipper
- Maj A. K. Singh, KC, SM
- Capt Sanjeev Shekhar, SC
- Capt Chandrahas Bharti, SC
- Maj Amreshwar Pratap Singh, SM(Bar), VSM - sailed from Mumbai to Panama;
- Capt Rakesh Bassi, SM - sailed from Mumbai to Trinidad;
- Lt Navin Ahuja, SM sailed from Trinidad to Auckland;
- Col T. P. S. Chowdhury, AVSM, Team Manager, sailed from Panama to Sydney;
- Maj A. Bhattacharya, SM, sailed from Auckland to Mumbai;
- Maj S. N. Mathur, SM, sailed from Sydney back to Mumbai.

== Circumnavigation ==
=== Bombay to Trinidad ===
The sailing expedition commenced from Bombay, India on 28 Sept 1985. Right from the time Trishna left harbour, she ran into the low pressure weather system of the receding monsoons which accompanied her till her first port of call at Male and thereafter to Mauritius on 25 October 1985. The boat was hit by severe storms on several occasions which damaged the VHF and HF radio aerials and electrical systems on board. The crew resorted to makeshift repairs at sea to restore communication and navigation systems. After a brief halt, the boat set sail from Port Louis, Mauritius on 30 October 1985. The sail to Saint Helena, South Atlantic Ocean around the Cape of Good Hope was rough and the longest non-stop leg of the trip, taking 33 days. Trishna on one occasion was swamped by a rogue wave and lost most of her life-saving equipment in the incident. The radio set was damaged and the antenna on the masthead broke. Communication with Mumbai and other ports was cut off. The sail across the South Atlantic Ocean was peaceful and Trishna reached St Helena on 2 December 1985.

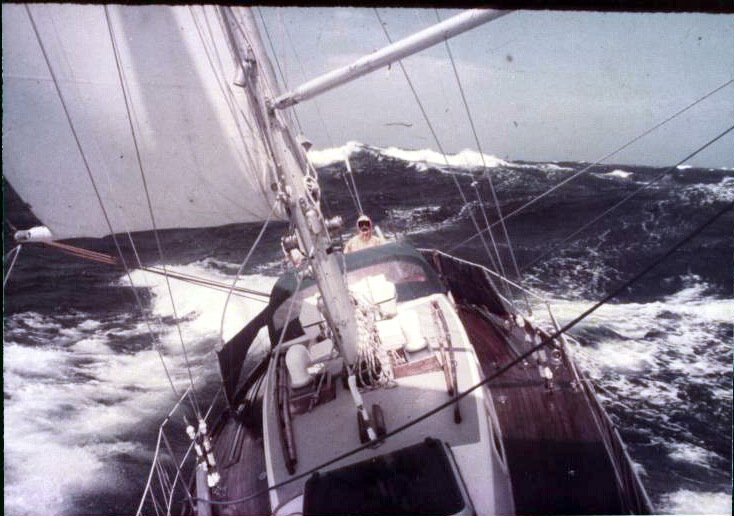
Trishna navigates the stormy seas off the Cape of Good Hope

The boat reached Ascension Island on 15 December 1985. Staying ashore or mooring on the island was not permitted and Trishna had to tie up alongside the oil tanker Maersk Ascension which is permanently anchored off the island.

The sail thereafter till the Caribbean Sea was largely calm. The winds remained predominantly South-Easterly. The first port of call on the continent of South America was at the coastal town of Natal. The crew celebrated the New Year of 1986 there with their Brazilian Navy hosts. From there, the boat sailed along the coast and then up the Para River to the port of Belém. Trishna had to sail upstream on this tributary of the Amazon River for 70 nautical miles against strong currents and myriad dangers in the form of fishing nets, unlit fishing trawlers and huge log floating down. Most of this distance was completed at night.

The next halt was at the port of Paramaribo, Suriname. The country has a large East Indian origin population and programs in Hindi were broadcast by the local radio station. It was a short hop from there to Georgetown, Guyana. The crew received an enthusiastic reception from the large Indian-origin population here. The Guyana Defence Force arranged a visit to the Kaieteur Falls by air during the short stay there. Trishna then proceeded to the Caribbean port of Port of Spain, Trinidad and Tobago for the first crew change of the voyage. The first crew change took place here and Capt R. Bassi was replaced by Lt. Navin Ahuja.

=== Trinidad to Panama City ===
The boat then sailed to Bridgetown, Barbados and then to Kingston, Jamaica. From there the boat crossed the Panama Canal.

At Panama City, the boat was taken out of the water and overhauled at the local US Naval Base. Minor repairs were carried out, barnacles removed and the hull was given a fresh coat of anti-fouling paint by the crew.

=== Panama City to Auckland ===
The voyage in the northern Pacific Ocean was relatively calm. With good winds Trishna sailed the 3,200 nautical miles – from Galapagos to Marquesas Islands non-stop in 23 days. This was her fastest passage so far.

Trishna halted at Tahiti and then sailed onward to Rarotonga and Suva, Fiji. The weather remained adverse on the leg from Fiji to Auckland. Winter had already set in the Southern Hemisphere by this time and the sail was extremely punishing for the crew in the wet and cold conditions.

Trishna again had a perilous encounter with some whales between Rarotonga and Fiji. On three occasions whales came within 10 to 15 meters of the yacht, dived underneath and swam nearby flipping their huge tails.

=== Auckland to Sydney ===
One of the most difficult legs of the voyage was the passage from Auckland to Sydney across the Tasman Sea. The leg was sailed from 3 to 17 Aug 1986. Trishna was hit by gales continuously for five days. The sails were ripped off and for the first time in the expedition, the 'hove-to' drill was carried out to ensure that the boat did not suffer major damages. The same storm meanwhile struck Sydney, causing the worst inundation of the city in the century.

=== Sydney to Bombay ===
The leg Sydney - Brisbane - Cairns - Thursday Island continued in rough weather, as predicted during the winter months. The voyage was difficult, though spectacular, owing to the sail along the Great Barrier Reef. Navigation was critical while sailing through the numerous reefs and on one occasion the boat ran aground on a moving sandbar. Fortunately, there was no damage though the crew had to wait till the next high tide to sail the boat off. The sail through Torres Straits again caused anxious moments as the Strait is only about a mile wide and it was a challenge navigating through this narrow passage. From Thursday Island to Darwin was a pleasant sail and the crew finally got some respite from adverse weather conditions. This gave the crew opportunity to work on the communication equipment to re-establish radio communications with India through the HAM network. Since rounding the Cape of Good Hope, there had been no direct communication between the boat and India. Maj SN Mathur was an expert HAM operator and he soon established a regular link with India.

Trishna left Darwin, North Australia on 13 October 1986 for Kupang, Timor. From there the boat sailed to Waingapu in Sumba and then to Bali, Indonesia. Good 'following' winds helped Trishna reach Bali on 22 October 1986. Bali has many Hindu temples and the crew arrived during one of the main Hindu festivals, Diwali, the festival of lights. This was the third Diwali celebrated by the crew away from home.

The yacht set sail from Bali on 2 November 1986, reaching Jakarta on 9 November; then via Singapore and Penang, Trishna made its first landfall on Indian shores at Campbell Bay, Nicobar on 10 December 1986. It was a momentous occasion and was celebrated with gusto with the whole crew present on the occasion. Maj KS Rao, the Skipper, also received his long-delayed promotion to the rank of lieutenant colonel here.

The home run via Colombo, Sri Lanka was uneventful.

Trishna received an enthusiastic welcome at the Gateway of India, Mumbai on her arrival there on 10 January 1987 where she was received by General Krishnaswamy Sundarji, the Chief of the Army Staff (India) accompanied by a large gathering of sailors, Service officers, friends and relatives.

The sea is a great mistress; she is really a magnificent lady of great stature. But as I have found out, you must treat her with enormous respect; for, she is inclined, if you do not do so, to suddenly smack you with a back-hander – if ever you get too familiar with her – which can be quite disastrous.

You must now be crossing the Pacific, and that would be your greatest hurdle, for that ocean can be imperious and very unrelenting. It is quite an uncharitable bit of water but I am quite sure, the whole world will be watching you and praying for you, and so you must come through.

— Admiral Ronald Lynsdale Pereira, Former Chief of the Naval Staff in a letter to a crew member, from Bangalore; dated 18 March 1986.

== Achievement ==
Ten officers of the Indian Army Corps of Engineers in a sailboat girdled the globe – 30,000 nautical miles – in less than 16 months creating Indian maritime history. They are the first Indians to circumnavigate the globe on Trishna - in Sanskrit the name means to fulfil their 'thirst' of sailing around the world.

== Honours and awards ==
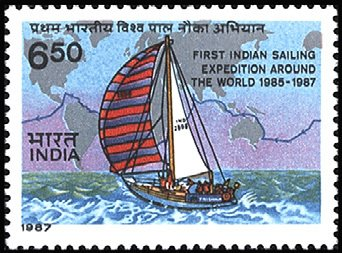
A commomerative postage stamp of the First Indian Sailing Expedition Around the World, 1987

Trishna was given the singular honour of thereafter being transported to New Delhi and took part on a tableau during the Republic Day Parade, 1987. This in itself was a herculean effort as the boat had reached Mumbai on 10 Jan 1987 itself and to participate in the Republic Day Parade on 26th, the boat had to be transported to New Delhi, the tableau to be fabricated to the exacting standards of the Ministry of Defence and cleared by their internal committee well before the rehearsals commenced. It seemed an impossible task, but with the concerted efforts of all those involved, the Indian Railways provided the carriage, Naval Dockyard Mumbai fabricated the boat cradle overnight on the railway carriage and then again the Railways moved it at express speed, literally, to New Delhi. The Bengal Engineer Group, Roorkee sent their fabrication team and completed the fabrication work at Vijay Chowk itself since the boat with its 54 ft high mast could not be transported anywhere else in the capital.

A commemorative postage stamp was released by India Post on the arrival of the boat back in Bombay on 10 January 1987.

The crew of Trishna was also honoured with the Order of Merit by the Ocean Cruising Club which recognised the voyage as the first circumnavigation by an Indian yacht.

The Government acknowledged this achievement by announcing awards for the whole crew on Republic Day, 1987.

The Trishna crew were awarded the "Admiral RH Tahiliani Trophy" for the Yachtsman of the Year 1987

Maj AK Singh became the first disabled sailor to circumnavigate the globe in a sailboat.

== Book Publication ==
Celebrated author, Dom Moraes volunteered to write an account of the historic voyage. The book named 'Trishna' was published by Perennial Press Mumbai and was released on 10 March 1988 at a glittering function held at the College of Military Engineering, Pune. The book received rave reviews and in the reviewer's words "Trishna is, in essence Moraes' personal tribute to the heroes whose courage and ability inspired him to undertake what, for him, is a new literary voyage."

He had earlier written an exhaustive account of the voyage in the Imprint magazine soon after the completion of the voyage.

== Gallery ==
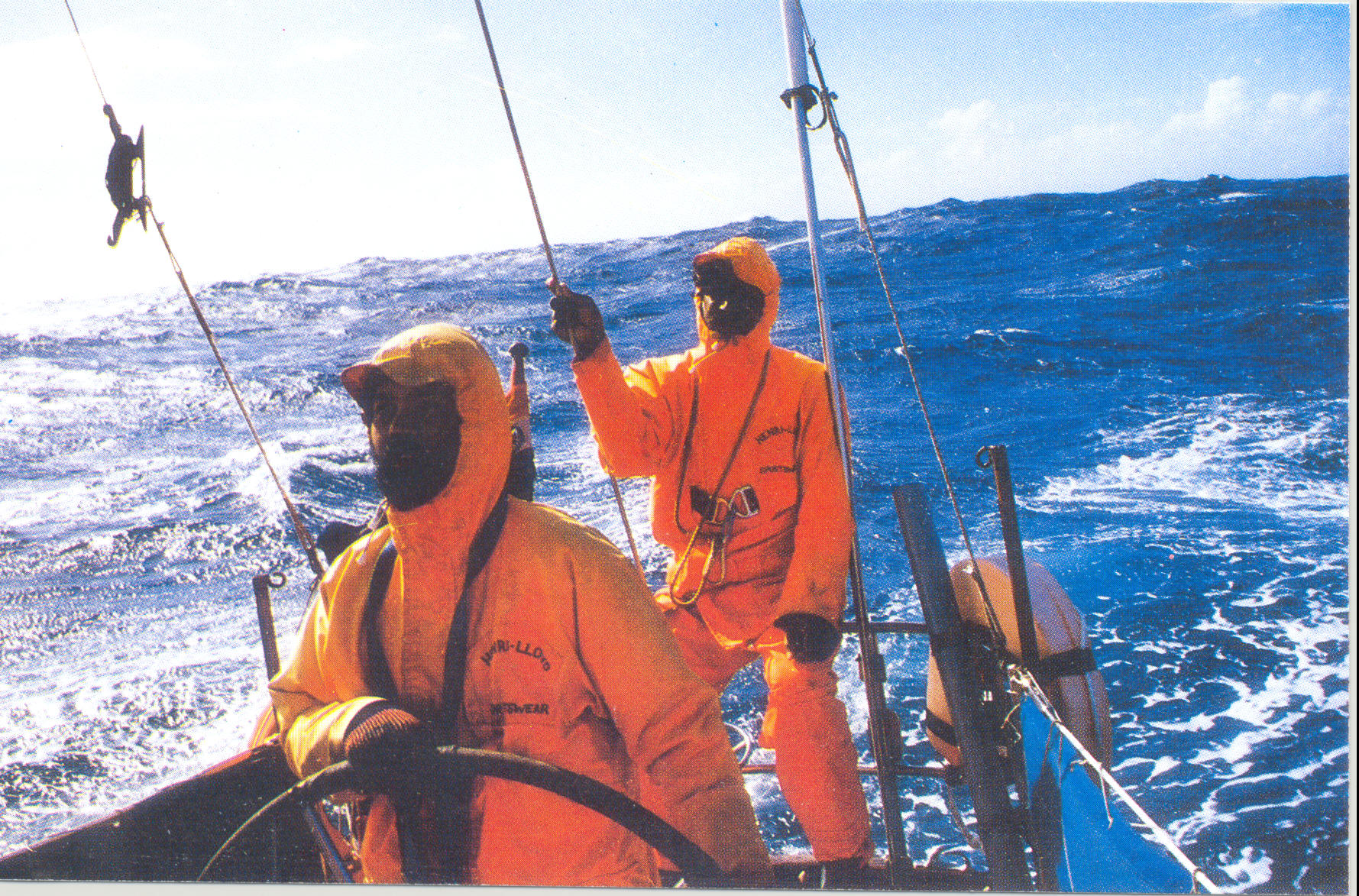
Trishna braving stormy seas

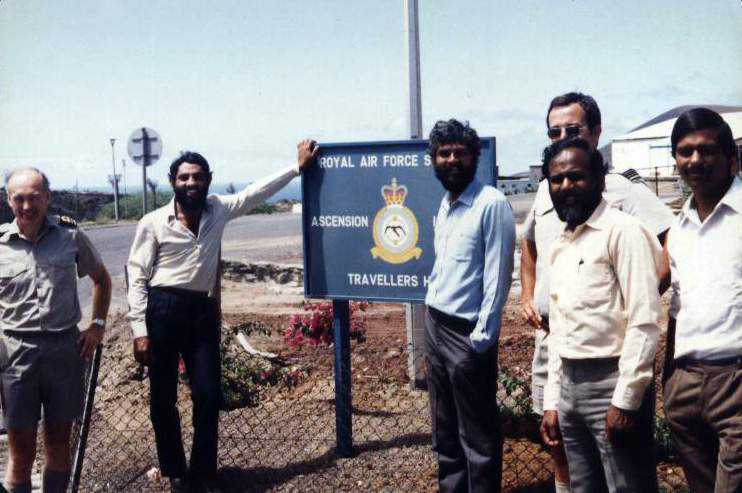
At the Royal Air Force base on Ascension Islands

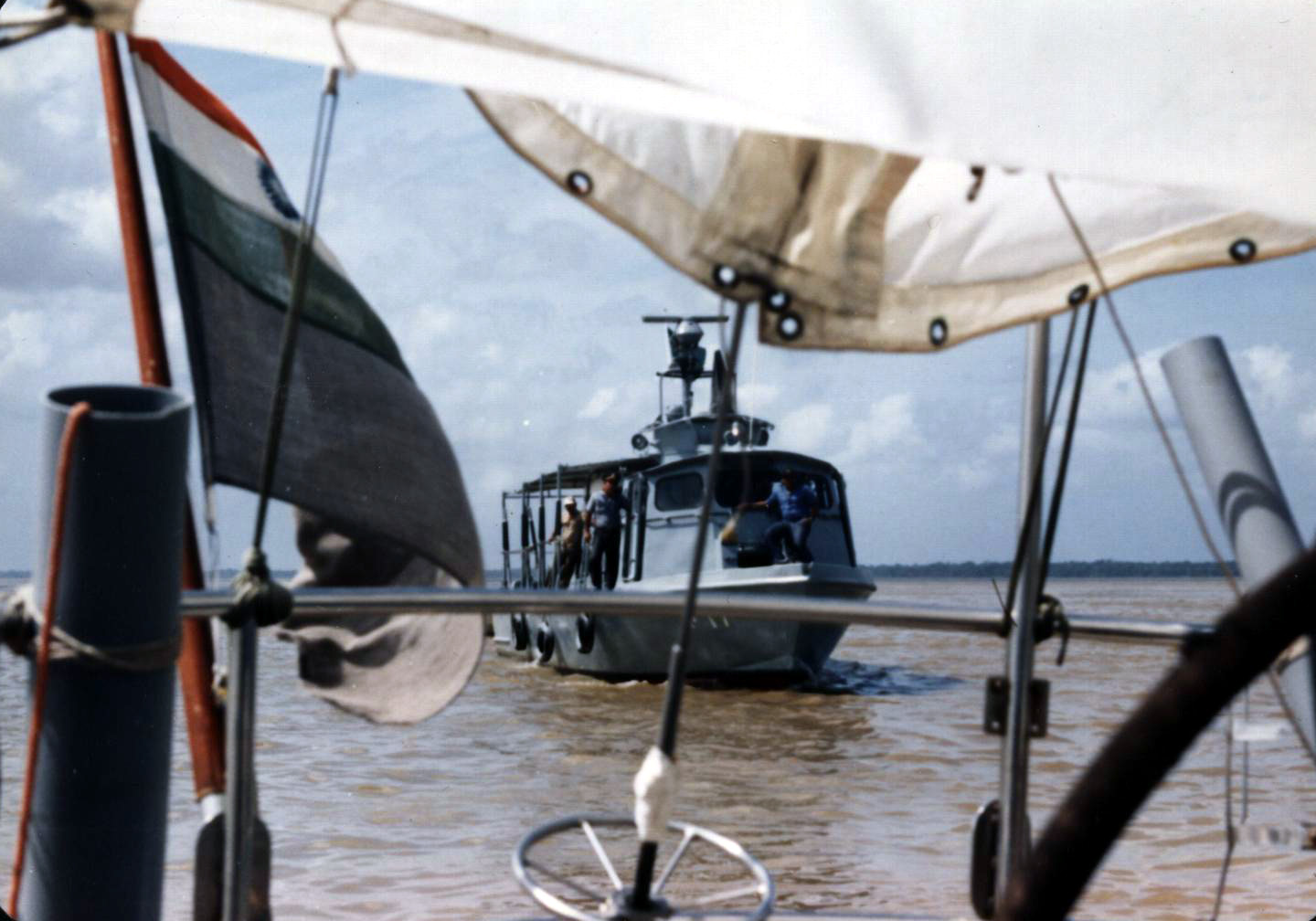
Sailing up the Amazon River into Belém, escorted by a Brazilian Navy patrol boat

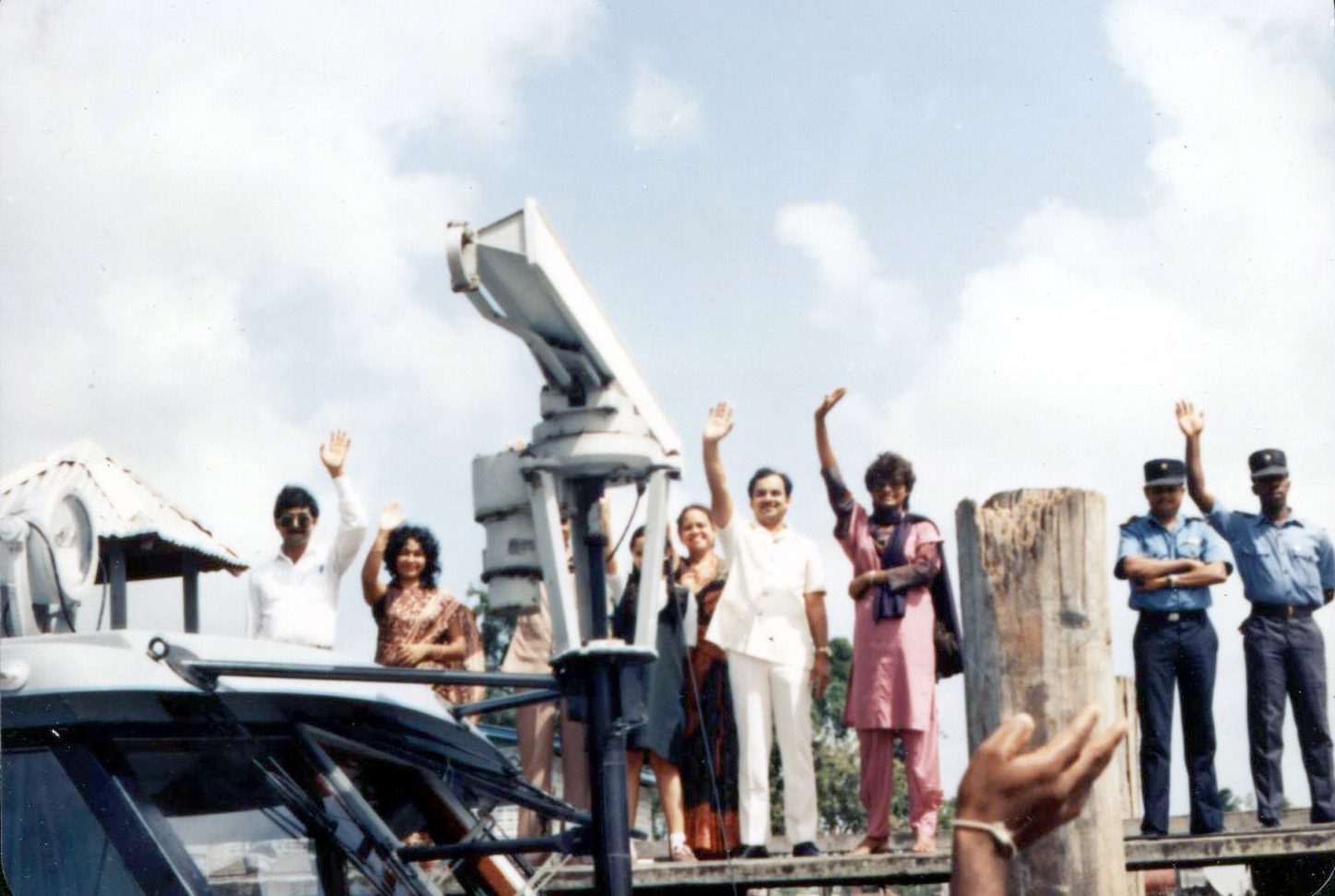
Indian Ambassador and locals bidding farewell at Georgetown, Guyana

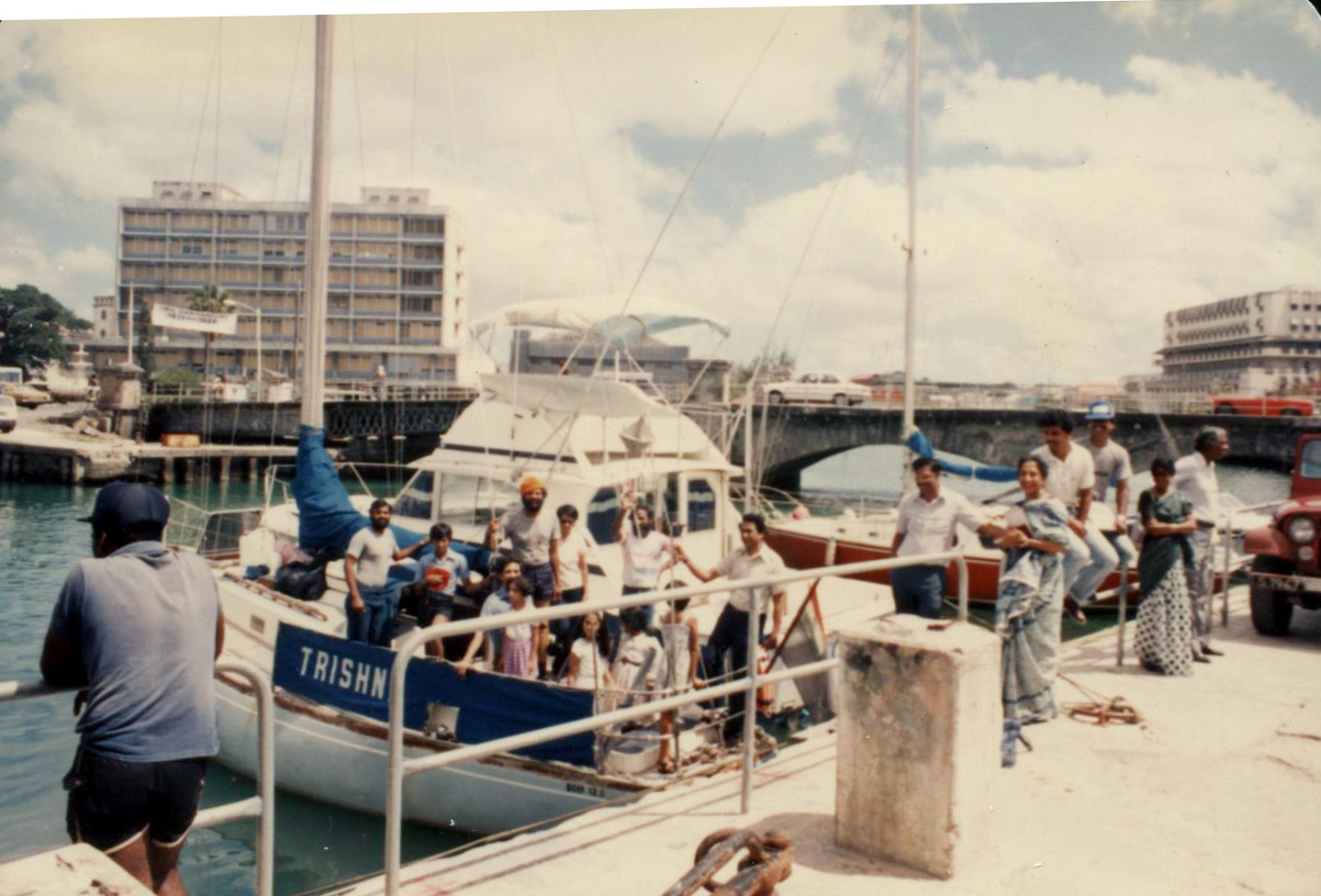
Trishna moored alongside at Bridgetown, Barbados

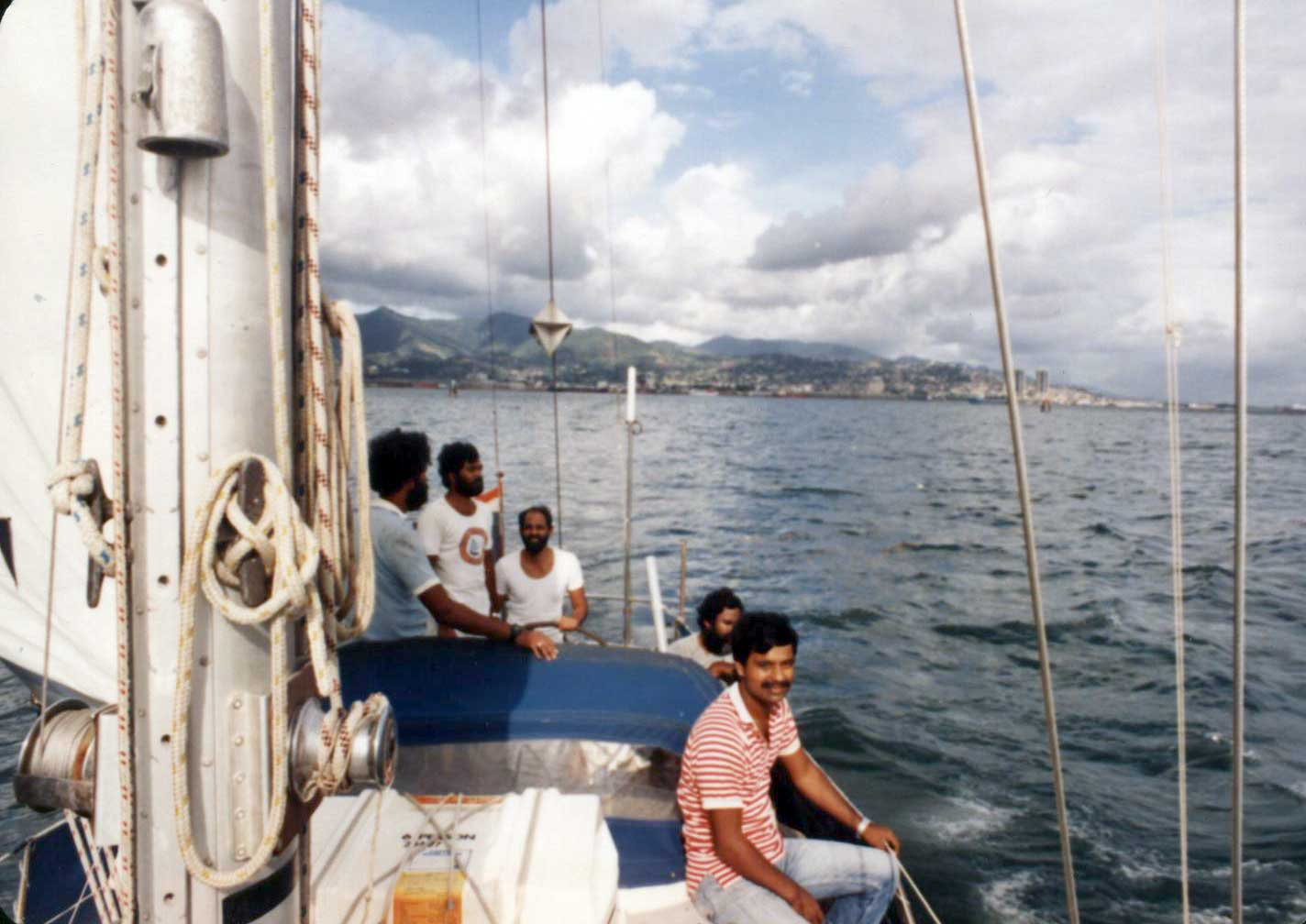
Trishna sailing out of Kingston, Jamaica

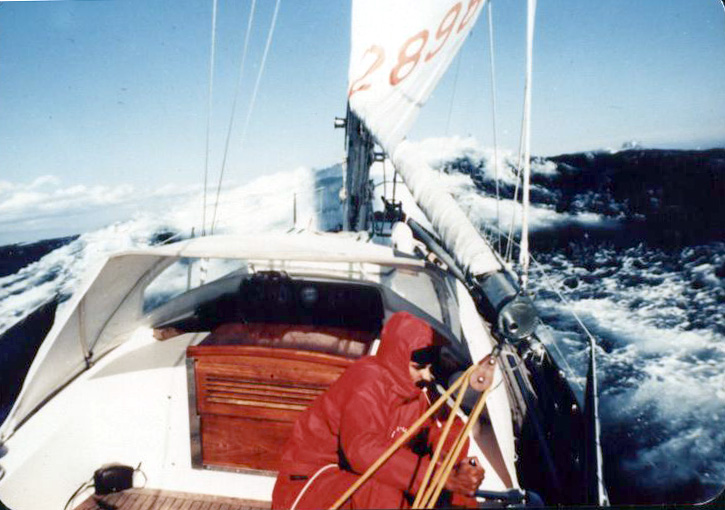
Working the winches during a storm

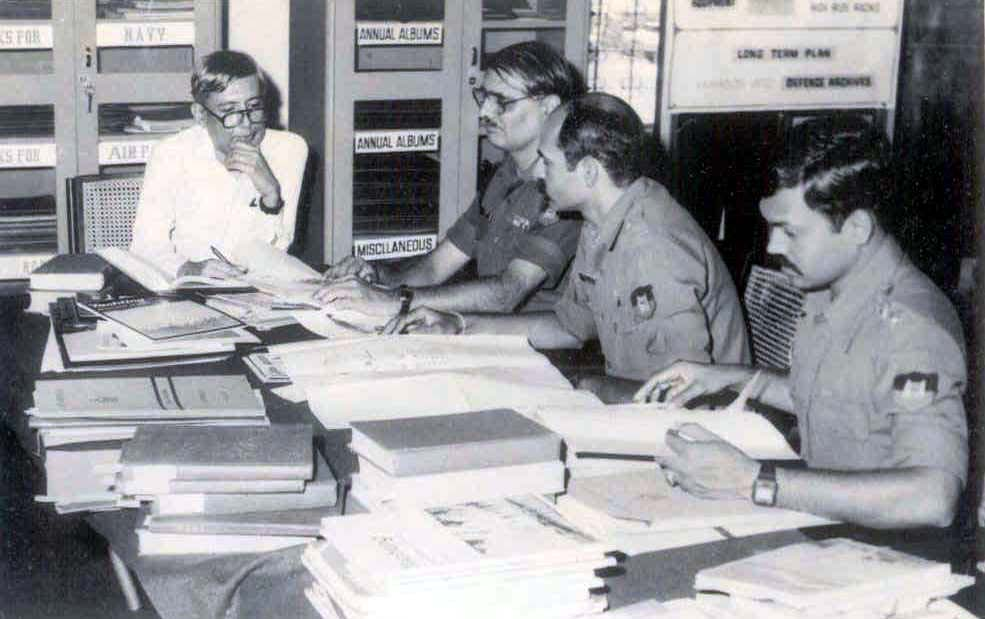
Dom Moraes interacts with the crew at the Corps Archives
