= S. K. Shrivastava =

Lieutenant General S K Shrivastava PVSM AVSM
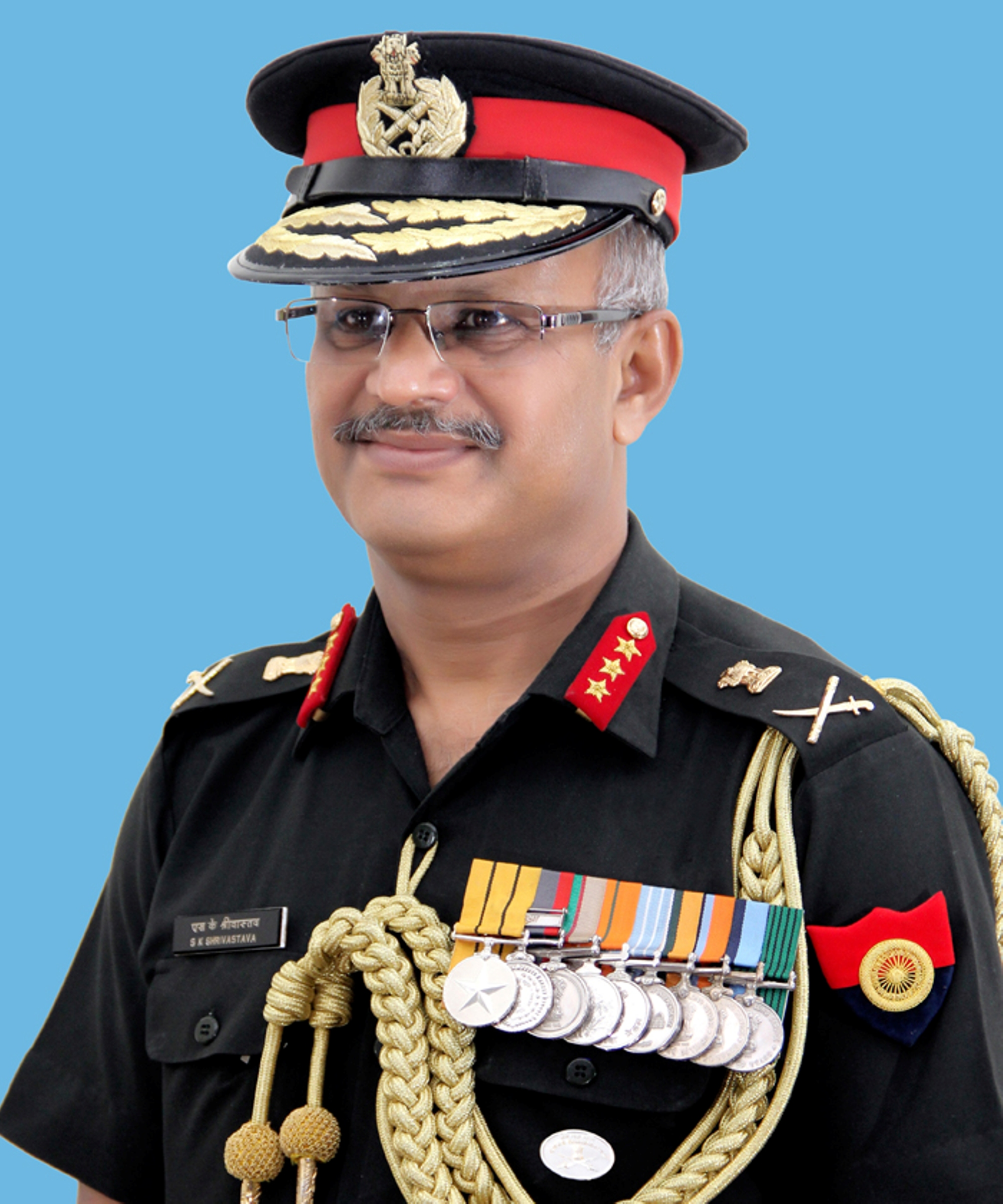
- Military career
- Allegiance: India
- Branch: Indian Army
- Service years: June 1980 – 2020
- Rank: Lieutenant General
- Units: Bengal Sappers, Corps of Engineers
- Commands: Engineer-in-Chief; Border Roads Organisation; Combat Engineers
- Conflicts: Operation Parakram
- Awards: Param Vishisht Seva Medal; Ati Vishisht Seva Medal

Lieutenant General Sanjeev Kumar Shrivastava, PVSM, AVSM is a former General Officer in the Indian Army. He last served as the Engineer-in-Chief of the Indian Army. He assumed office on 1 April 2018, taking over from Lt Gen Suresh Sharma.

== Career ==
Shrivastava is an alumnus of National Defence Academy, Pune and the Indian Military Academy, Dehradun. He was commissioned into the Bengal Sappers of the Corps of Engineers in 1980.

During his career, He has attended the Defence Services Staff College, Army War College, Mhow and the National Defence College, New Delhi.

Shrivastava is a Post Graduate in Docks and Harbour from Indian Institute of Technology Bombay and has M Phil degrees from Devi Ahilya Vishwavidyalaya, Indore and Madras University.

Shrivastava commanded an Engineer regiment during Operation Parakram and an Engineer Brigade. He later served as the Director General Combat Engineers. In February 2017, he took over as the Director General Border Roads Organisation (DGBR) from Lt Gen Suresh Sharma who went on to become Engineer-in-Chief.

As the Engineer-in-Chief, he served as the Senior Colonel Commandant of the Corps of Engineers.

Shrivastava was awarded the Ati Vishisht Seva Medal in 2018 for his outstanding services and achievements in fast-tracking the execution of Indo-China Border Roads. He was awarded the Param Vishisht Seva Medal in 2020 during his tenure as Engineer-in-Chief.

Military offices
Preceded by Suresh Sharma	Engineer-in-Chief; 1 April 2018 - Present	Succeeded by Incumbent
Preceded by Suresh Sharma	Director General Border Roads; 2017 - 2018	Succeeded by Harpal Singh
