= Natasha Badhwar =

Indian author and journalist

- Born: 11 July 1971 (age 54); Ranchi, India
- Occupations: Author; columnist; filmmaker
- Organization: NDTV (1995–2007)
- Notable work: My Daughters Mum, Immortal For a Moment, Reconciliation

Natasha Badhwar (born 11 July 1971) is an Indian author, columnist, filmmaker, journalist and a media trainer. She has written the books, My Daughters Mum and Immortal For a Moment.

== Early life and career ==
Natasha Badhwar was born on 11 July 1971 in Ranchi. She began her career in broadcast journalism with NDTV (New Delhi Television Ltd.). She worked there for almost 13 years and left it as vice president for training and development in 2007. She covered the 2002 Gujarat riots as a video journalist.

== Selected works ==
Books by Badhwar include:

- My Daughters Mum
- Immortal for a Moment: Small Answers to Big Questions About Life, Love and Letting Go
- Reconciliation: Karwan-e-Mohabbat's Journey of Solidarity through a Wounded India (co-authored with Harsh Mander and John Dayal).
