= Fateh Chand Badhwar =

Indian civil servant (1900–1995)

- Born: 1900
- Died: 10 October 1995 (aged 94–95)
- Occupation: Civil Servant
- Awards: Order of the British Empire (in 1946); Padma Bhushan (in 1955)

Fateh Chand Badhwar OBE (1900 – 10 October 1995) was an Indian civil servant and the first Indian to become chairman of the Railway Board.

== Early life and education ==
Badhwar's father was an officer in the Indian Civil Service. He completed his schooling from Sherwood College in Nainital and later went on to study Mechanical Science Tripos at Cambridge University.

== Career ==
Badhwar began his career as a marine engineer, working in several European countries on marine civil engineering projects after completing his engineering degree at Cambridge.

In June 1925, he joined the East Indian Railway at Calcutta where he became one of the first Indian recruits in the technical services of the railways. In his early years in the railways he was assigned to several civil works including the laying of new lines and bridges and he had a stint at Liluah's Carriage and Wagons workshop.

During World War II, Badhwar served with the Corps of Engineers where he rose to become a lieutenant-colonel. For his services to the war effort, Major Fateh Chand Badhwar, commanding officer of the Technical Group of the East Indian Railway was awarded the MBE (Military) in 1942.

He rejoined civil administration the following year and served variously as Secretary to the Railway Board, General Manager of the Oudh and Tirhut Railway and from 1949 on the Railway Board as Member Staff and then as Member Engineering. For his services, he was made an Order of the British Empire OBE (Civil) in 1946.

In 1951 he was appointed chairman of the Railway Board — the first Indian to occupy that office which he held until his retirement in October 1954.

As Chairman of the Railway Board, Badhwar oversaw the amalgamation of the various privately owned railways, government owned lines and those of the princely states into the single organisation of the Indian Railways. He was also a proponent of indigenisation of railway technology and used his technical skills and training to reduce India's railway imports from Britain and to modernise the railways' rolling stock. This he achieved through the Research Design and Standards Organisation, Lucknow which was established during his term as chairman of the Railway Board.

As the chairman of the Indian Railways, he was also part of high-powered committees to industrialise the newly independent India.

== Later life ==
After his retirement, Badhwar served on the Board of Directors of Bird & Heilgers, Pvt. Ltd. He was also made chairman of the Customs Inquiry Committee and the National Industrial Development Corporation. He helped reorganize the Ceylon Government Railway in the 1950s when he served in that country under the Colombo Plan for two months. Badhwar was a nature enthusiast and mountaineer who served as president of the Delhi Bird Watchers Society and had a long association with The Himalayan Club of which he was the first Indian president between 1964 and 1967. He also served as the Secretary of the Patiala-based Indian Society for Cultural Cooperation and Friendship.

Badhwar died on October 10, 1995.

== Honours ==
Badhwar was honoured by the Government of India with a Padma Bhushan in 1955. Badhwar Park, a railway residential colony in Mumbai's Colaba area has been named in his honour.
