= Trishna (yacht) =

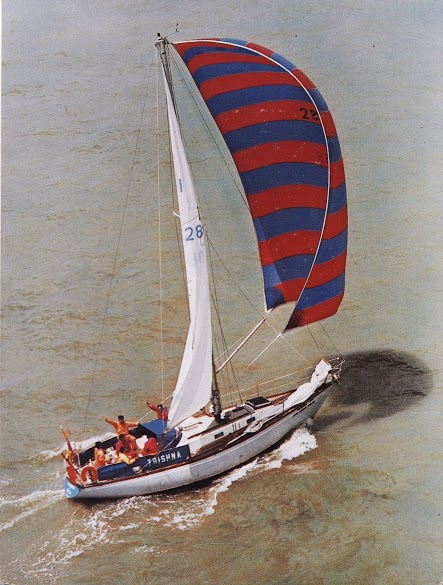
- Yacht Trishna begins its epic circumnavigation.

History

India
- Name: Trishna
- Owner: Sapper Adventure Foundation
- Operator: Indian Army Corps of Engineers
- Port of registry: Mumbai, India
- Builder: Nautor's Swan
- Launched: 1970
- Christened: Guinevere of Sussex
- Acquired: 1984
- Renamed: Trishna
- Home port: Mumbai
- Identification: BOM 109

General characteristics
- Class & type: Swan 37
- Type: Yacht
- Tonnage: 10.5 tonnes
- Length: 36 ft 6 in
- Beam: 10 ft 9 in
- Draught: 6 ft 1 in
- Sail plan: Sloop
- Crew: 6

Trishna is a Swan 37 yacht belonging to the Corps of Engineers of the Indian Army. The name Trishna means "to thirst for" in the Sanskrit language. The 1970-vintage boat, earlier known as Guinevere of Sussex, was purchased in 1984 from the United Kingdom. The yacht has since been used for long-distance ocean sailing and training. The first of the yachts' journeys after it was acquired was its voyage from Gosport to Mumbai, India. Subsequently, the yacht embarked on its most notable voyage, the circumnavigation of the globe from 1985 to 1987. This was the first such achievement by an Indian crew. In subsequent years, the yacht has been used for international cruises primarily in the Indian Ocean region . The Yacht currently is decommissioned and is displayed as an exhibit at the College of Military Engineering, Pune Museum.

== Background ==
The Indian Army Engineers have been in the forefront of adventure activities in the Country, whether on land, sea or air. They have been the pioneers in Ocean Cruising in India.

The Sapper Adventure Foundation had sponsored a sailing expedition from Bombay to Bandar Abbas, Iran in 1977 in an 20-foot 1909-vintage wooden Seabird Class sailboat Albatross to test the sailing capabilities of the sailors of the Corps of Engineers and a precursor to the circumnavigation of the globe by the Sappers on Trishna. The 68-day 7,000 km voyage to Bandar Abbas was one of the early major ventures by the Corps.

== Purchase of boat and sail from Gosport, England to Bombay, India ==
The planning for the circumnavigation commenced in early 1980s and finally took off in 1984 when a team of officers from the Corps of Engineers flew to the U.K. to buy a boat and sail it back to India. Limited funds dictated the Sapper Adventure Foundation to opt for the purchase of a second-hand sailboat for the venture. After an extensive survey of the second-hand boat market in the U.K., the 1970-vintage Swan 37 boat Guinevere of Sussex was shortlisted, which was based at Brighton. After purchase of the yacht, it was sailed by the crew to the Joint Services Sailing Centre, Gosport, U.K., now known as the Joint Services Adventure Sail Training Centre, where it underwent minor repairs and partial essential re-fit to make it sail-worthy for the voyage back to India. The crew also underwent sail training, which was organised under the aegis of the Royal Engineers. Major Ron Gravels, ex-Royal Engineers, was engaged and he undertook a month-long sail training program for the crew on the Solent, English Channel crossings to Cherbourg culminating in a sail to the ports of Guernsey and Alderney in the Channel Islands.

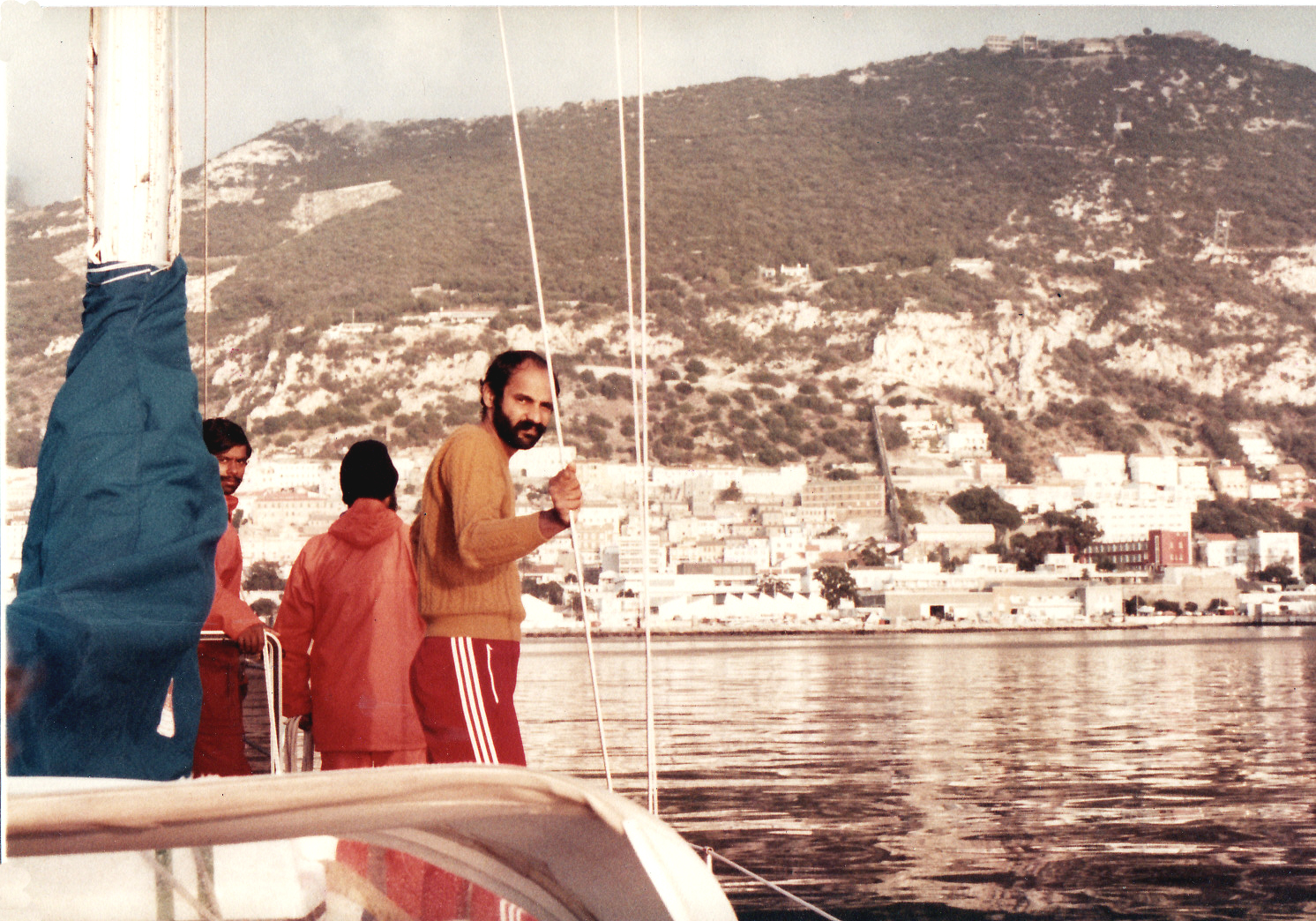
Trishna entering Gibraltar harbour

Trishna set off on her first long-distance voyage from the Joint Services Sailing Center, Gosport, U.K. on 12 October 1984. With the onset of winter, the crew had a rough passage, especially in the Bay of Biscay, Mediterranean Sea and the Red Sea. With halts at Alderney (14 October), A Coruña (20 October), Lisbon (26 October), Gibraltar (1 November), Ibiza (7 November), Malta (17 November), Iraklion (24 November), Port Said (1 December) through the Suez Canal to Port Suez (7 December), Port Sudan (15 December), Aden (30 December), Salalah (10 January 1985), Muscat, Oman (19 January) and Bombay (1 February 1985).

=== Team ===
The team to sail the boat back from Gosport, United Kingdom to Bombay, India consisted of the following members:

- Maj K. S. Rao, SC, SM, – Skipper
- Maj Amreshwar Pratap Singh, SM (Bar), VSM
- Maj A. K. Singh, KC, SM
- Capt Sanjeev Shekhar, SC
- Capt Chandrahas Bharti, SC
- Col T. P. S. Chowdhary, AVSM, Team Manager – sailed from Gosport to Port Said
- Capt M.S. Pillai, SM – sailed from Port Said to Mumbai

Maj A. K. Singh was handicapped. His leg had been amputated above the knee after a hang gliding accident in 1981.

== Voyages by Trishna ==
- Gosport-Alderney-A Coruña-Lisbon-Gibraltar-Ibiza-Malta-Crete-Port Said-Suez Canal-Port Suez-Port Sudan-Aden-Salalah-Muscat-Bombay in September 1984 to February 1985
- Mumbai-Lakshwadeep-Goa-Mumbai in April 1985
- Around the World Sailing Expedition: Bombay-Male-Mauritius-St Helena-Ascension Island-Natal-Belém-Suriname-Guyana-Trinidad-Barbados-Jamaica-Colón-Panama Canal-Panama City-Galapagos-Tahiti-Suva, Fiji-Auckland-Sydney-Darwin-Bali-Jakarta-Campbell Bay-Colombo-Bombay
- Goodwill Sailing Expedition:Mumbai-Kochi-Galle-Campbell Bay-Penang-Singapore-Port Kelang-Phuket-Port Blair-Goa-Mumbai in 1994–1995
- Mumbai-Dubai-Muscat-Seychelles-Maldives-Sri Lanka-Kochi-Mumbai in 1996–1997
- Millennium Sailing Expedition: Mumbai-Kochi-Galle-Campbell Bay-Penang-Singapore-Port Kelang-Phuket-Port Blair-Goa-Mumbai in 1999–2000
- Mumbai-Male-Colombo-Mumbai in 2010.

Note: The Goodwill Sailing Expedition 1994–1995 was the first occasion when a lady member, 2/Lt. Deepanita Dass, was included as a crew member in any Indian sailing expedition.

== Silver Jubilee Anniversary ==
The Indian Army Corps of Engineers celebrated the silver jubilee of the historic completion of the First Indian circumnavigation on 10 January 2012 by again sailing Trishna across Mumbai harbour to the Naval Sailing Club, Colaba, Mumbai, the place from where she had set off on its journey in 1985.

== Gallery: Gosport-Bombay 1984–1985 ==
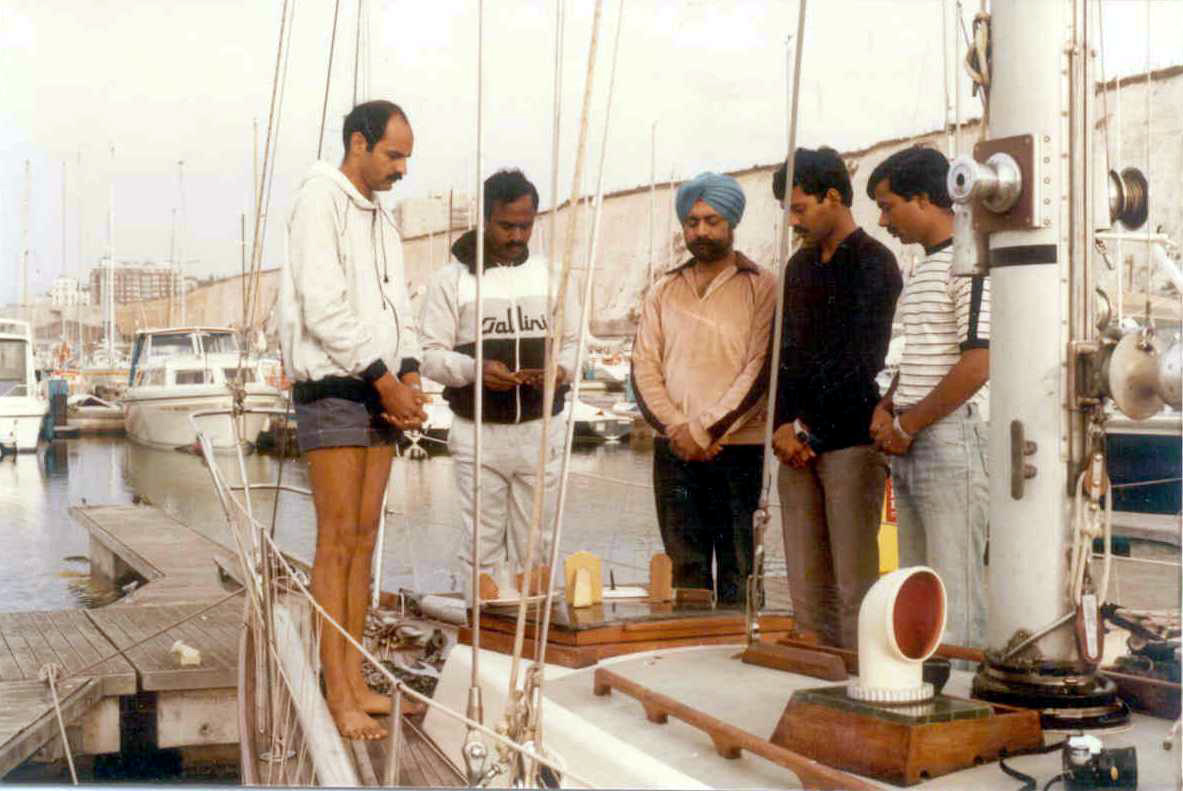
Puja on board after taking possession of Trishna at Brighton Marina

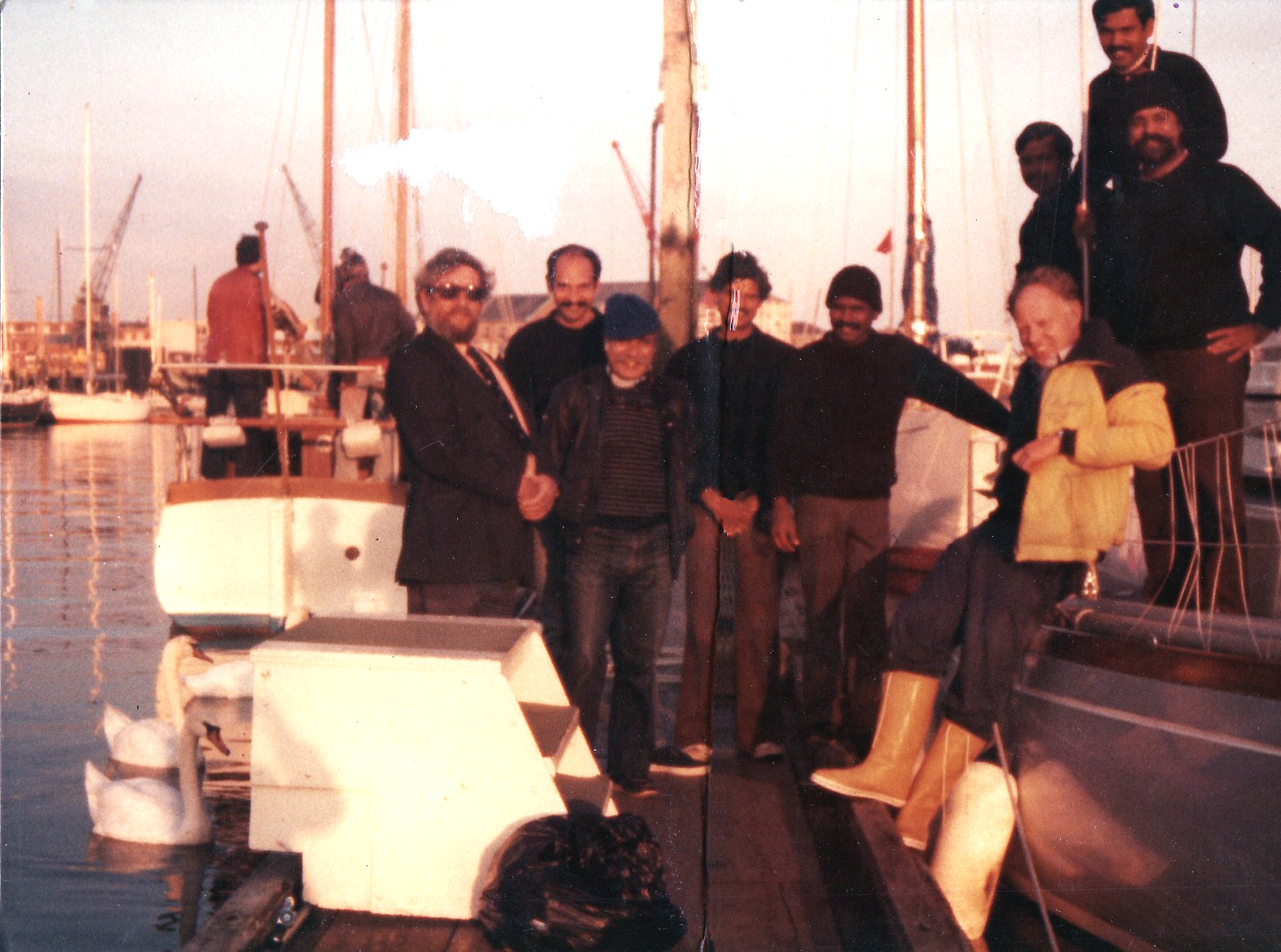
The team at the Joint Services Sailing Center, Gosport with Maj Gen HK 'Harry' Kapoor, Maj Gen Neil Carter, RE and Maj Ron Gravels

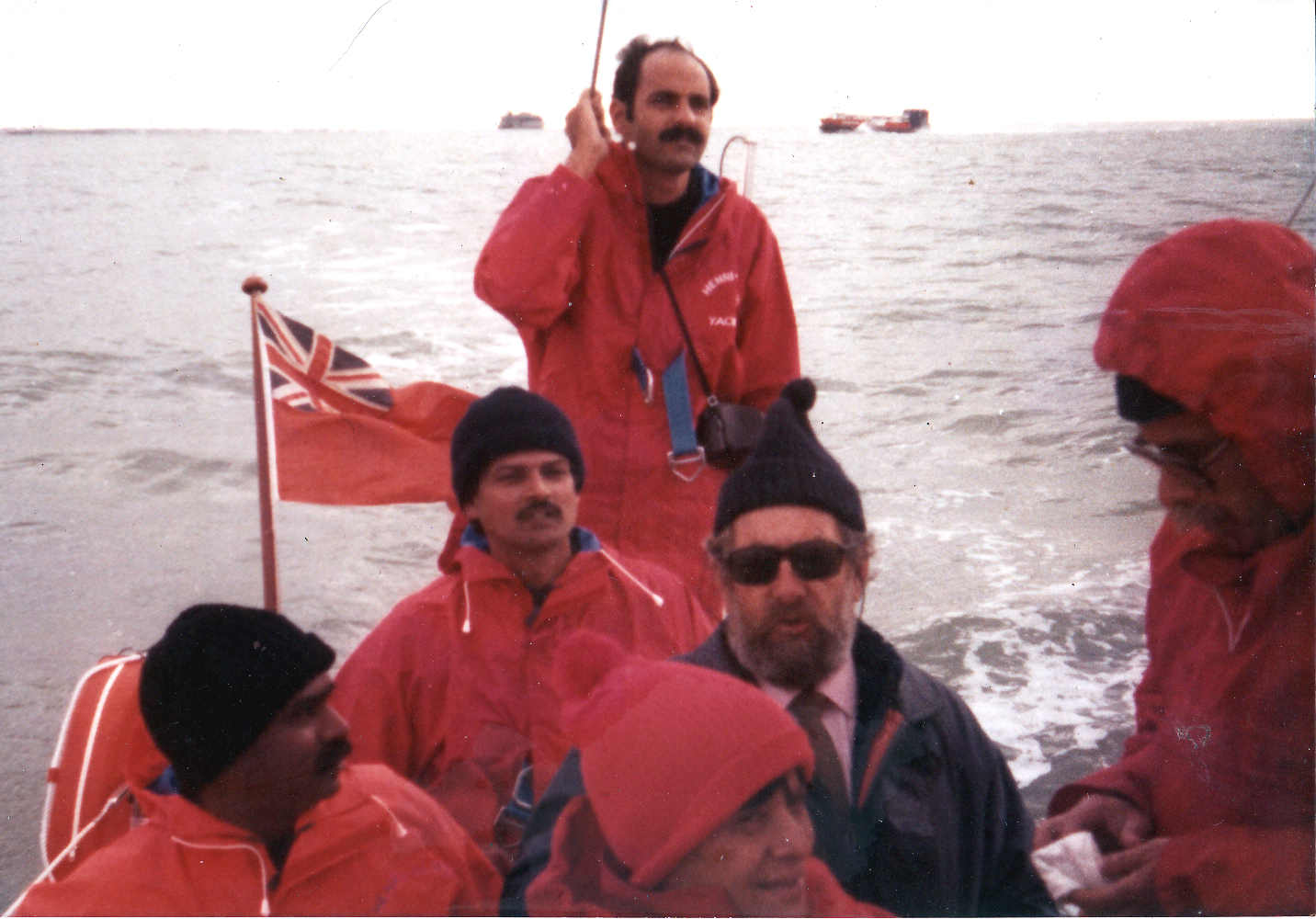
A training sail along the Solent

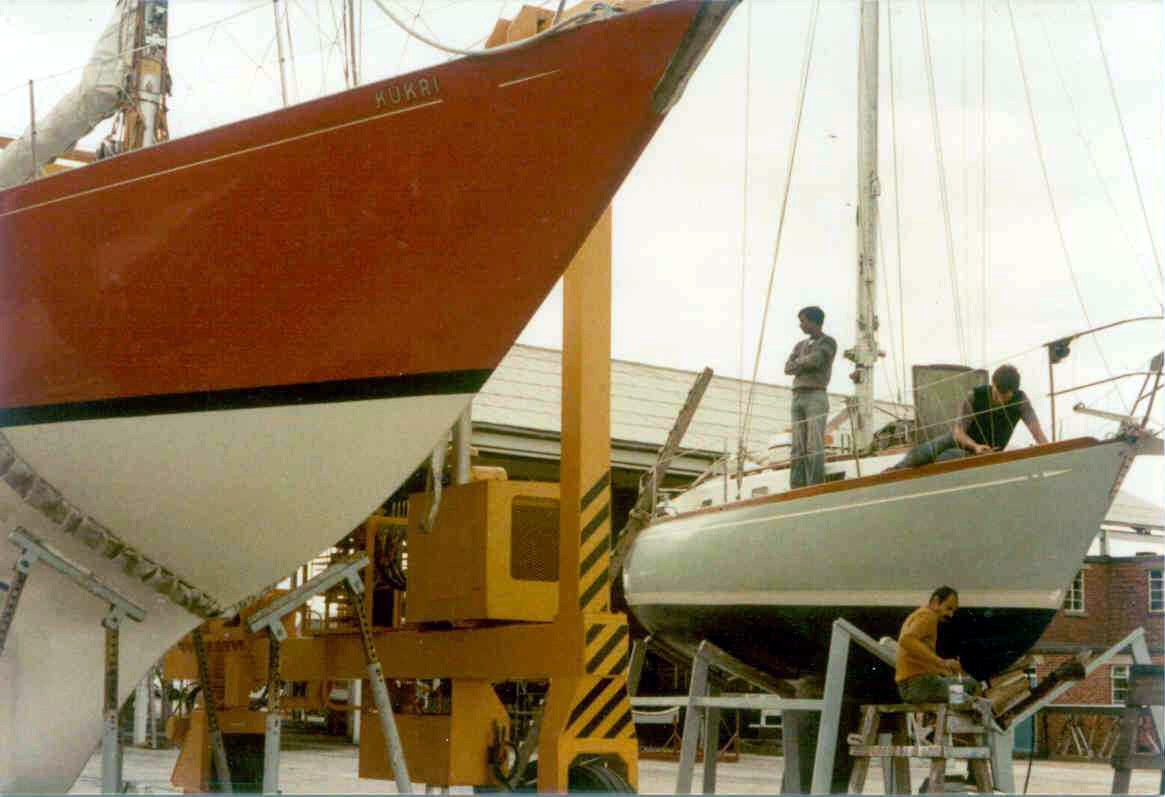
Working on the boat at the Joint Services Sailing Center, Gosport

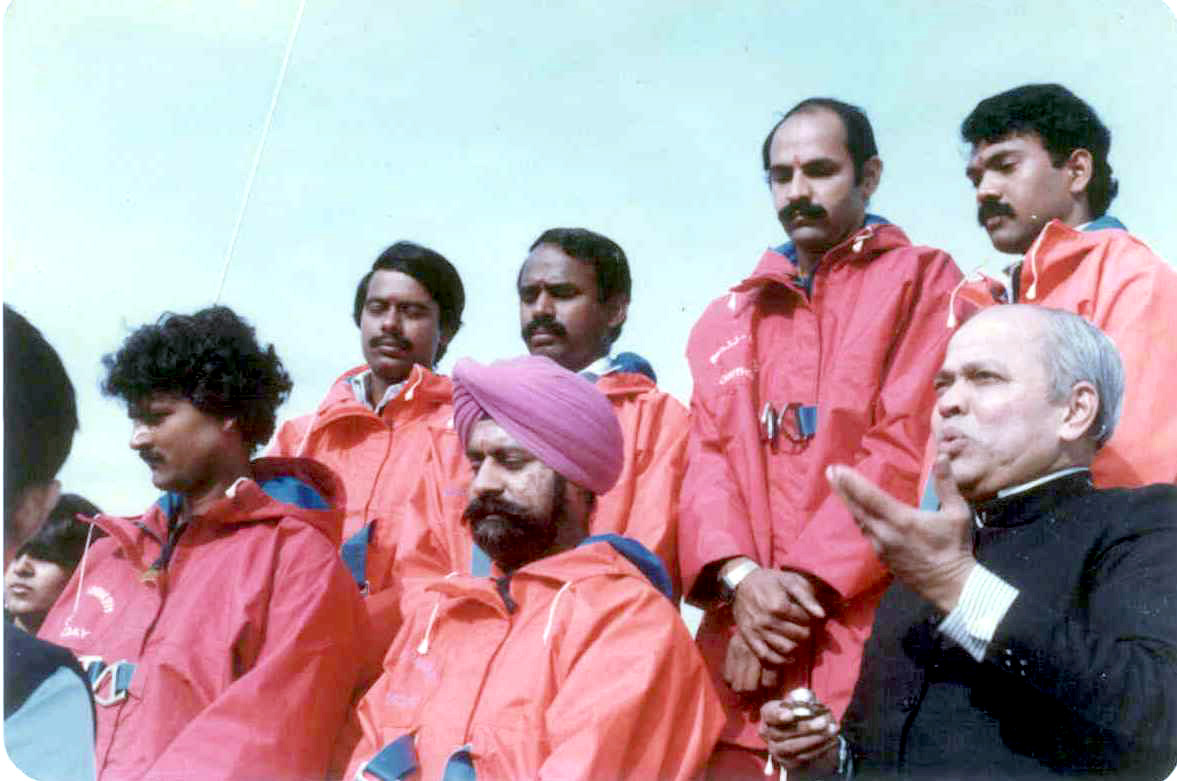
Invoking the Sea Gods for a safe voyage before sail off from Gosport

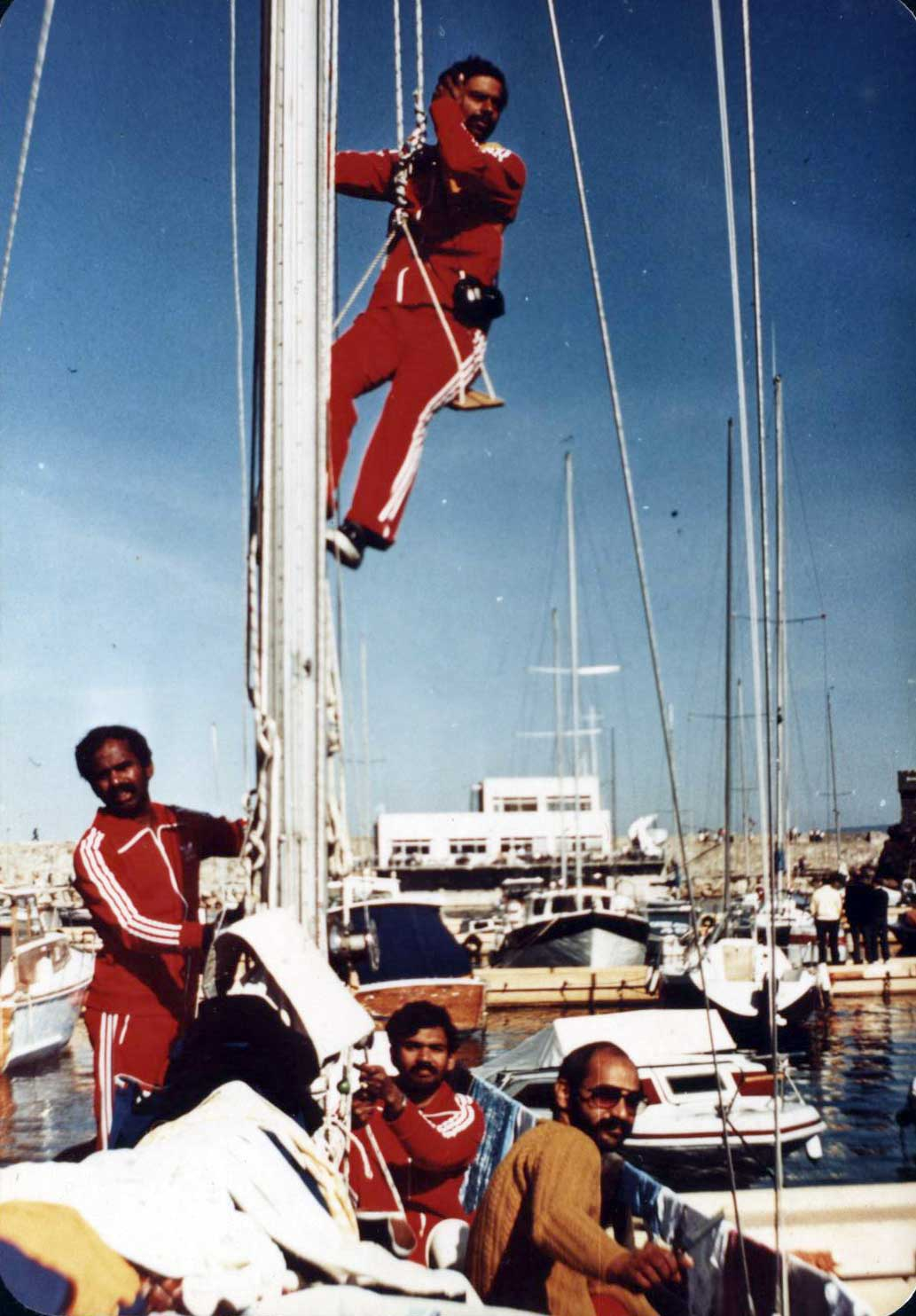
Boat maintenance at La Corona after battling storms during the Bay of Biscay crossing

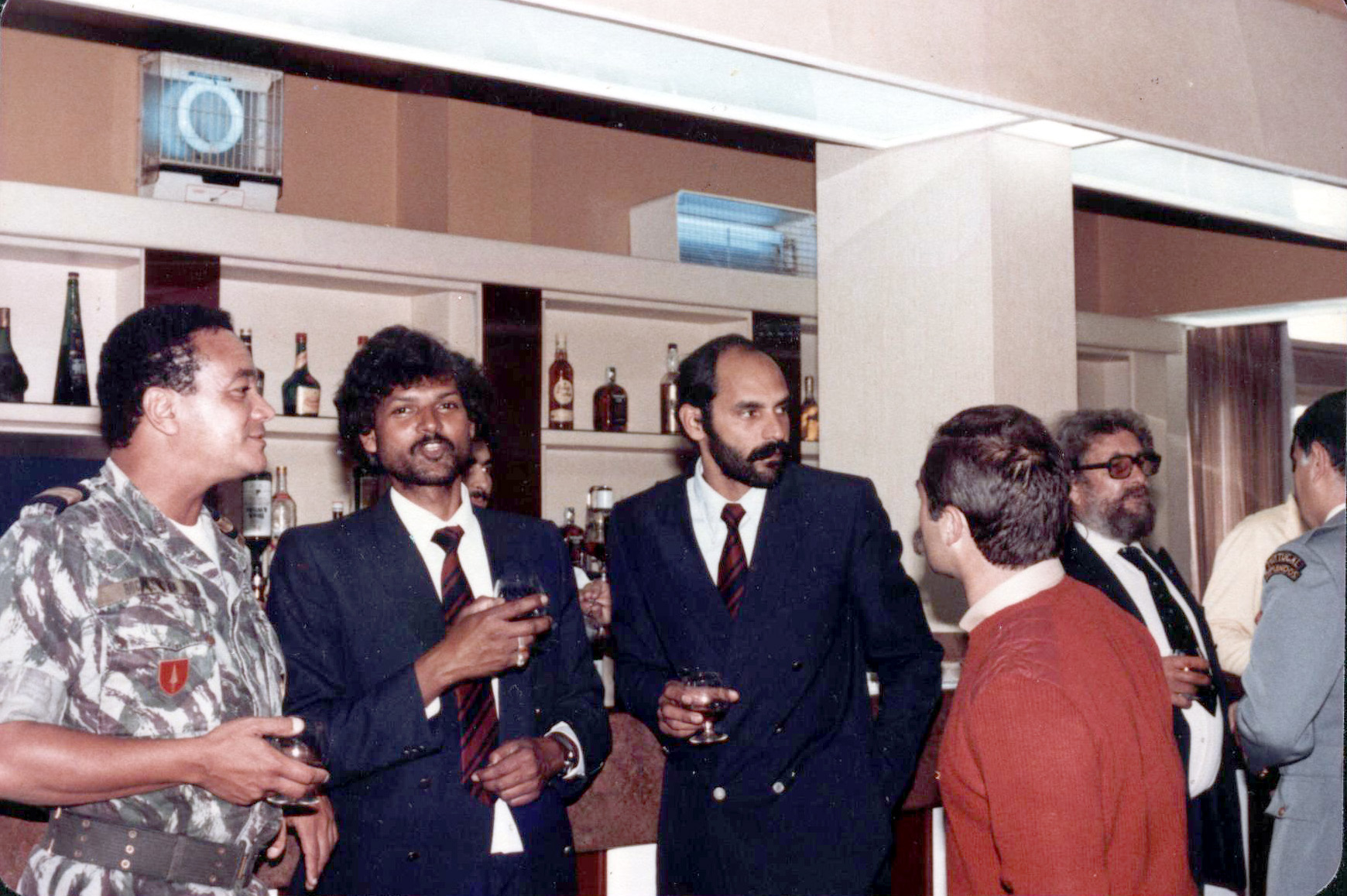
A relaxing moment with the Portuguese Army Commandos at Lisbon

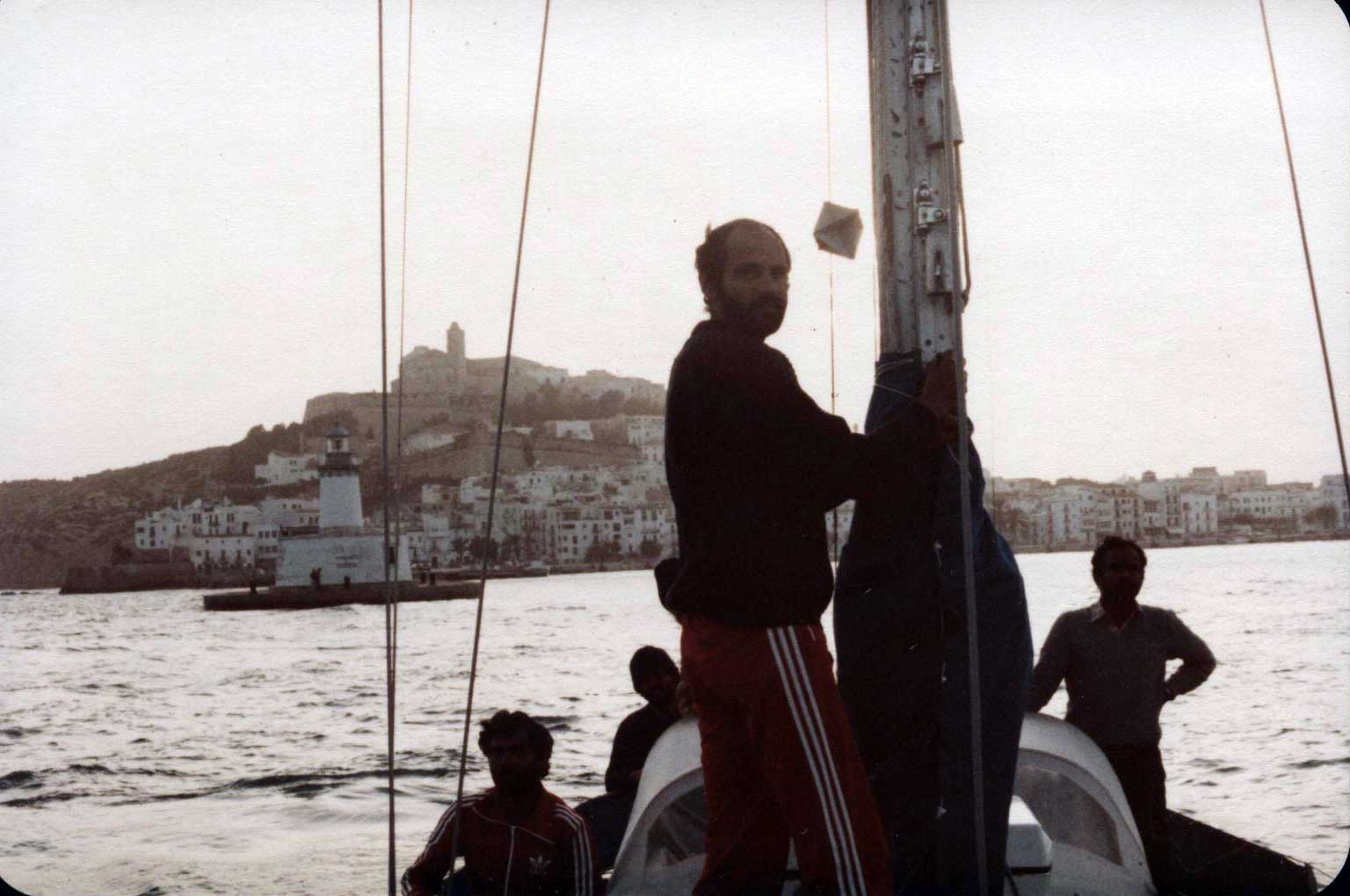
Sailing out of Lisbon

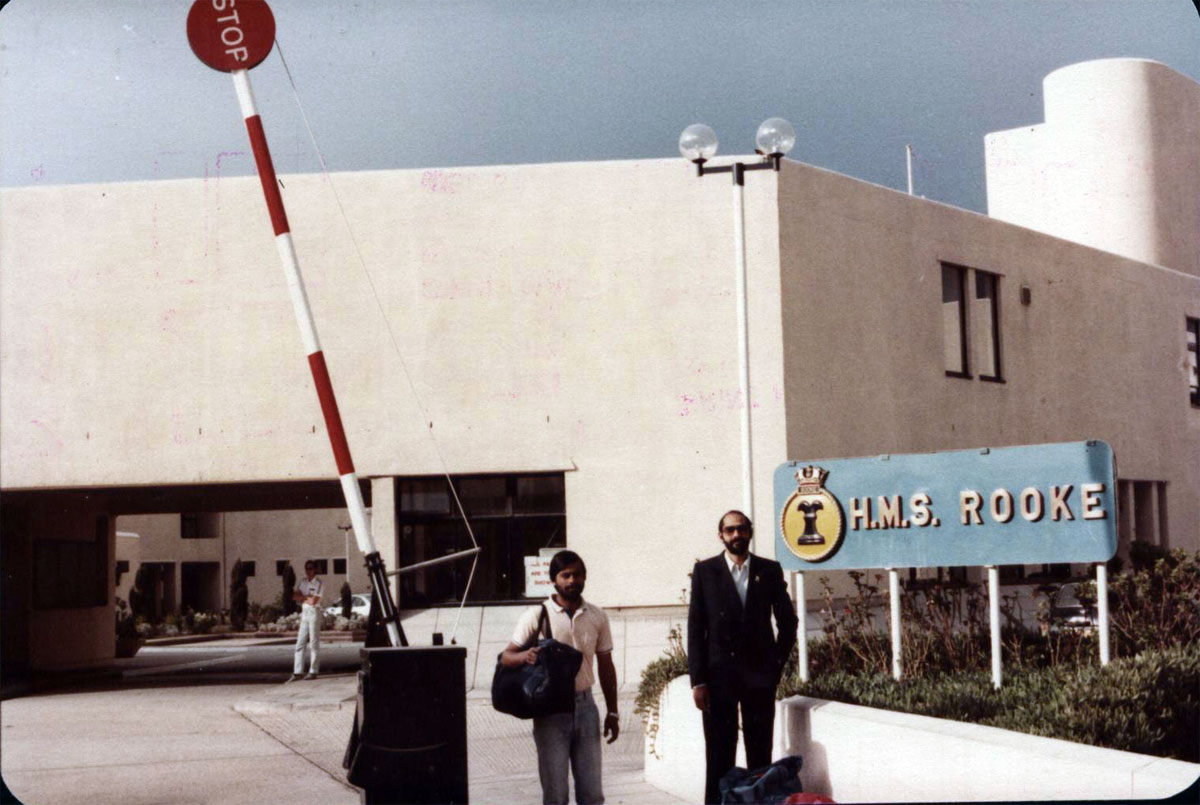
Crew at the Royal Navy base at Gibraltar

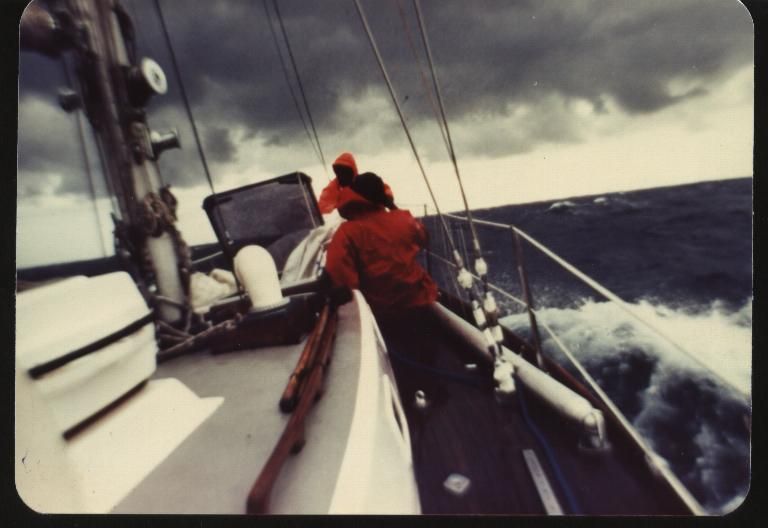
Battling the seas during storms in the Red Sea

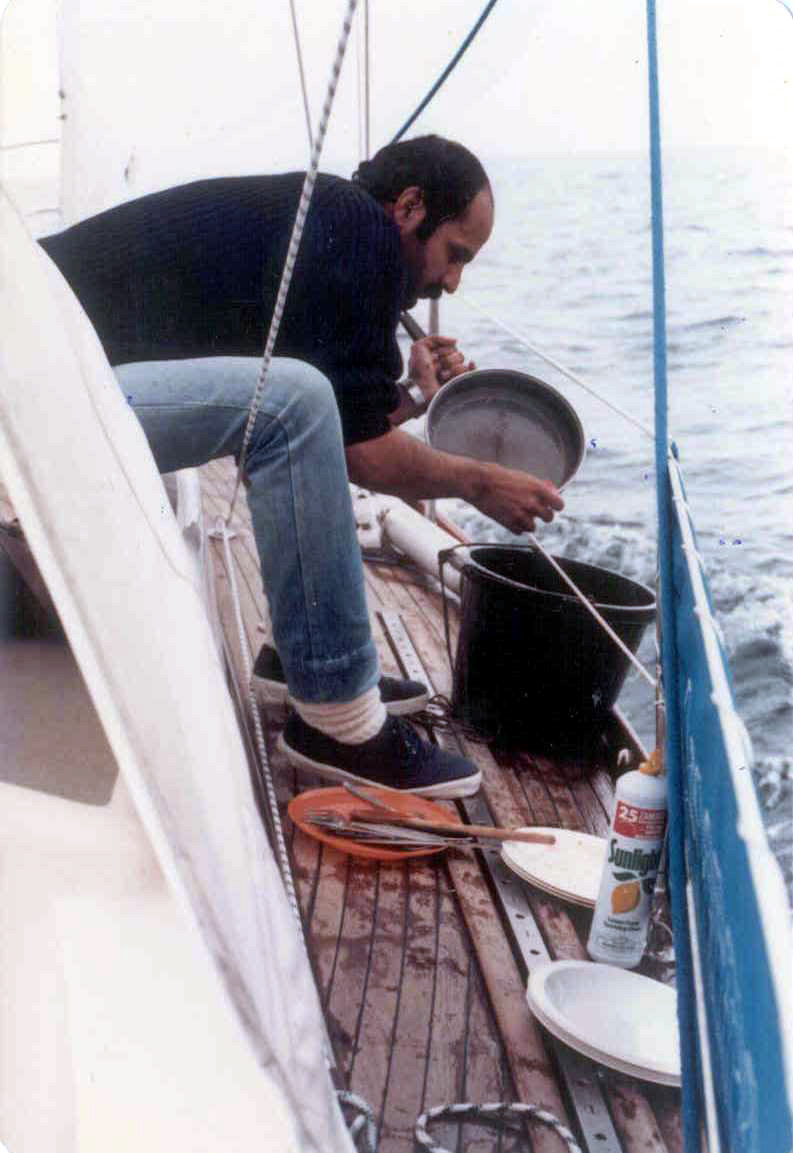
Cleaning up during Mother's Watch routine

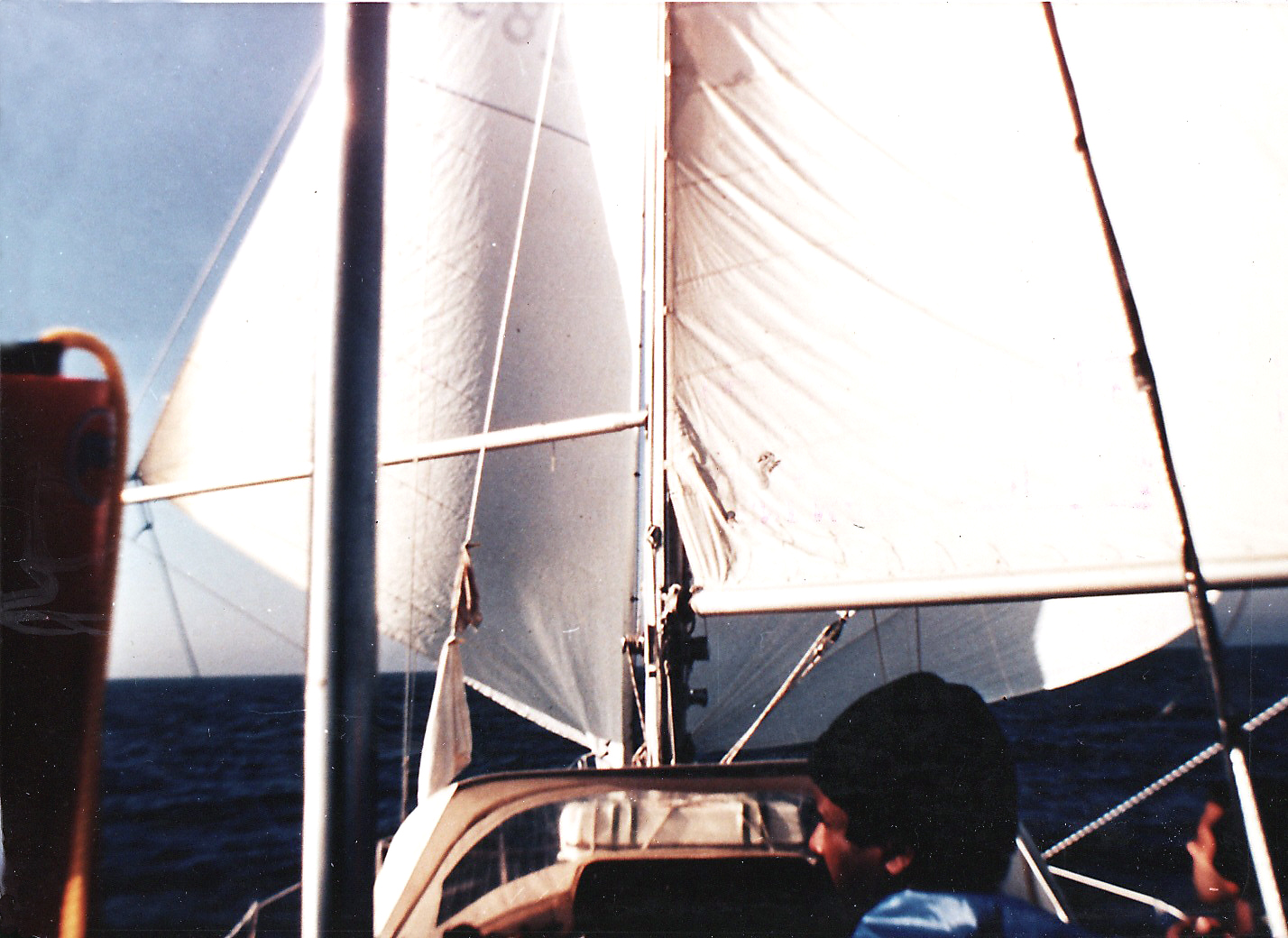
A calm moment in the Arabian Sea
