= Harsh Mander =

Indian social activist and writer

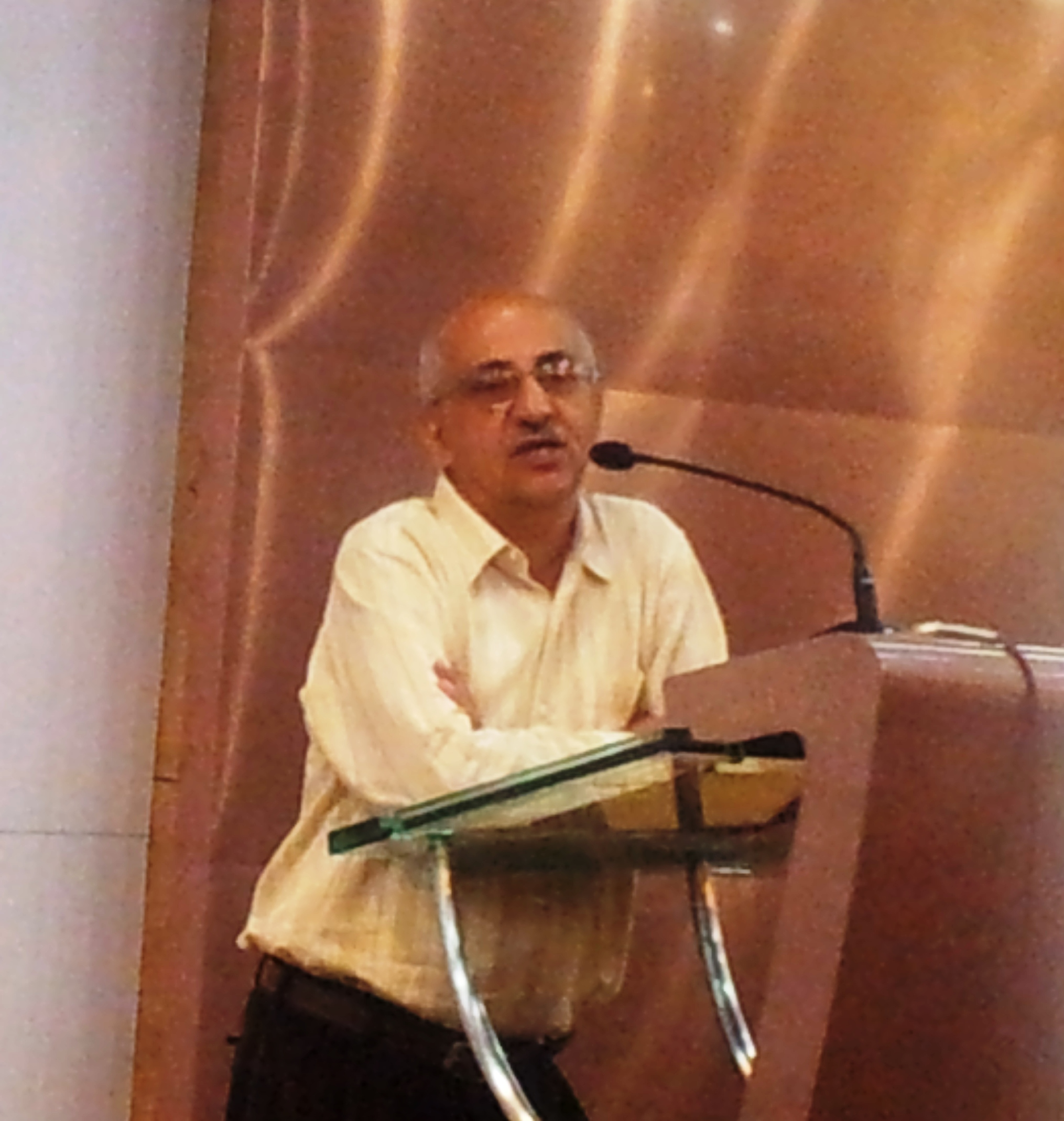
- Harsh Mander talking at The Energy and Resources Institute Bangalore on the subject "Unequal India", program hosted by Azim Premji University
- Born: 17 April 1955 (age 71)
- Citizenship: Indian
- Occupations: Writer, Activist

Harsh Mander (born 17 April 1955) is an Indian author, columnist, researcher, teacher, and social activist who started the Karwan-e-Mohabbat campaign in solidarity with the victims of communal or religiously motivated violence. He is the Director of the Center for Equity Studies, a research organisation based in New Delhi. He also served as Special Commissioner to the Supreme Court of India in the Right to Food Campaign and was a member of the National Advisory Council of the Government of India, set up under the UPA government.

== Career ==
=== As IAS Officer ===
Mander served in the Indian Administrative Service (IAS), working for nearly two decades in states including Madhya Pradesh and Chhattisgarh.

=== Teaching career ===
Mander has taught courses on poverty and governance at the Indian Institute of Management Ahmedabad and St. Stephen’s College, Delhi.

He has also taught at institutions including Jamia Millia Islamia and the Lal Bahadur Shastri National Academy of Administration. In addition, he has delivered lectures at universities and institutions in India and abroad, including the Massachusetts Institute of Technology, University of California, Los Angeles, and Jawaharlal Nehru University.

== Social works ==
Following the 2002 Gujarat riots, he resigned from the civil service and began working in the field of social activism.

He has been associated with several public policy and rights-based initiatives, including the National Campaign for the People’s Right to Information. He has also served on advisory and working groups of the National Human Rights Commission of India related to issues such as bonded labour and mental health.

From 1999 to 2004, Mander served as Country Director of ActionAid India. He has also been associated with initiatives in public health and social inclusion, including the State Health Resource Centre in Chhattisgarh, which contributed to the development of community health programmes such as the ASHA programme.

In June 2010, he was appointed a member of the National Advisory Council chaired by Sonia Gandhi. During his tenure, he worked on issues related to food security, urban poverty, and social protection. His tenure ended in 2012.

Mander has expressed opposition to the death penalty.

In March 2023, the Ministry of Home Affairs (India) recommended a CBI inquiry into an organisation associated with Mander regarding alleged violations under the Foreign Contribution (Regulation) Act, 2010.

In April 2026, Mander presented a complaint against Assam Chief Minister Himanta Biswa Sarma before a Delhi Court regarding a series of alleged public statements made by Sarma exhorting people to harm "Miyas" and making other alleged incendiary statements against Miya community, seeking registration of FIR in the matter. The Judicial Magistrate First Class Court dismissed this petition and refused to direct registration of FIR. It cited lack of territorial jurisdiction and lack of material to prove that the alleged remarks caused enmity and disharmony in Delhi Court's jurisdiction. Mander has challenged this Order before the Revisional Court, which had issued notice to Sarma on 26 Maay 2026.

== Literary works ==
Mander has written and co-authored several books and regularly writes columns for newspapers like The Hindu, Hindustan Times and Dainik Bhaskar, and contributes frequently to scholarly journals. His stories have been adapted into films such as Shyam Benegal’s Samar, and Mallika Sarabhai’s dance drama, Unsuni.

Some of his selected publications include:

- (2019) 'Between Memory and Forgetting: Massacre and the Modi Years in Gujarat' (New Delhi, Yoda Press)
- (2019) 'Partitions of the Heart: Unmaking the Idea of India' (New Delhi, Penguin Viking)
- (2018) 'The Right to Food Debates: Social Protection for Food Security in India' (New Delhi, Orient Blackswan) (authored with Ashwin Parulkar, Ankita Aggarwal)
- (2018) 'Reconciliation: Karwan e Mohabbat’s Journey of Solidarity through a Wounded India' (New Delhi, Context) (co-authored with Natasha Badhwar).
- (2016) 'Fatal Accidents of Birth: Stories of Suffering, Oppression and Resistance' (New Delhi, Speaking Tiger Books)
- (2015) 'Looking Away: Inequality, Prejudice and Indifference in New India' (New Delhi, Speaking Tiger Books)
- (2012) 'Ash in the Belly: India's Unfinished Battle Against Hunger' (New Delhi, Penguin India)
- (2009) 'Fear and Forgiveness' (New Delhi, Penguin India)
- (2026) 'When Bereft of Care: Equity, Justice and the Human Right to Health' (Erlangen, FAU University Press)

== See also ==
- Natasha Badhwar
