= Married Accommodation Project =

Consequent to the promise made to the Indian Armed Forces by the Government of India, the Married Accommodation Project, or MAP, was begun to construct married accommodation for the three services, with a view to remove over a period of time the complete deficiency of married accommodation for service personnel of the Indian Armed Forces.

A separate Directorate General Married Accommodation Project (DG MAP) was raised on 31 May 2002 by the Government of India under the aegis of Engineer-in-Chief for this purpose, subsequent to the Prime Minister of India's announcement on 15 Aug 2001.

With a mandate to construct 200,000 dwelling units, it is one of the largest construction endeavors in the world.

== See also ==
- Indian Army Corps of Engineers
