= Neera K. Badhwar =

American-Indian philosopher

- Born: Neera Kapur Badhwar; 1946 (age 79–80)

Education
- Education: Fergusson College (BA), City College, CUNY, New York (MA), University of Toronto (PhD)

Philosophical work
- Era: Contemporary philosophy
- Region: Western philosophy
- Institutions: University of Oklahoma
- Main interests: Ethics, political philosophy

Neera Kapur Badhwar (born 1946) is an Indian philosopher and Professor Emeritus of Philosophy at the University of Oklahoma. She is known for her works on ethics and political philosophy.

== Books ==
- Friendship: A Philosophical Reader (ed.) (Cornell Univ. Press, 1993).
- Is Virtue Only A Means to Happiness? (The Objectivist Society, 2001), 2nd edition (The Atlas Society, 2015).
- Well-Being: Happiness in a Worthwhile Life (Oxford University Press, 2014).
- Philosophical Essays on Friendship (Tehran: Naqde Farhang, 2025, in Persian)
