= Swan 37 =

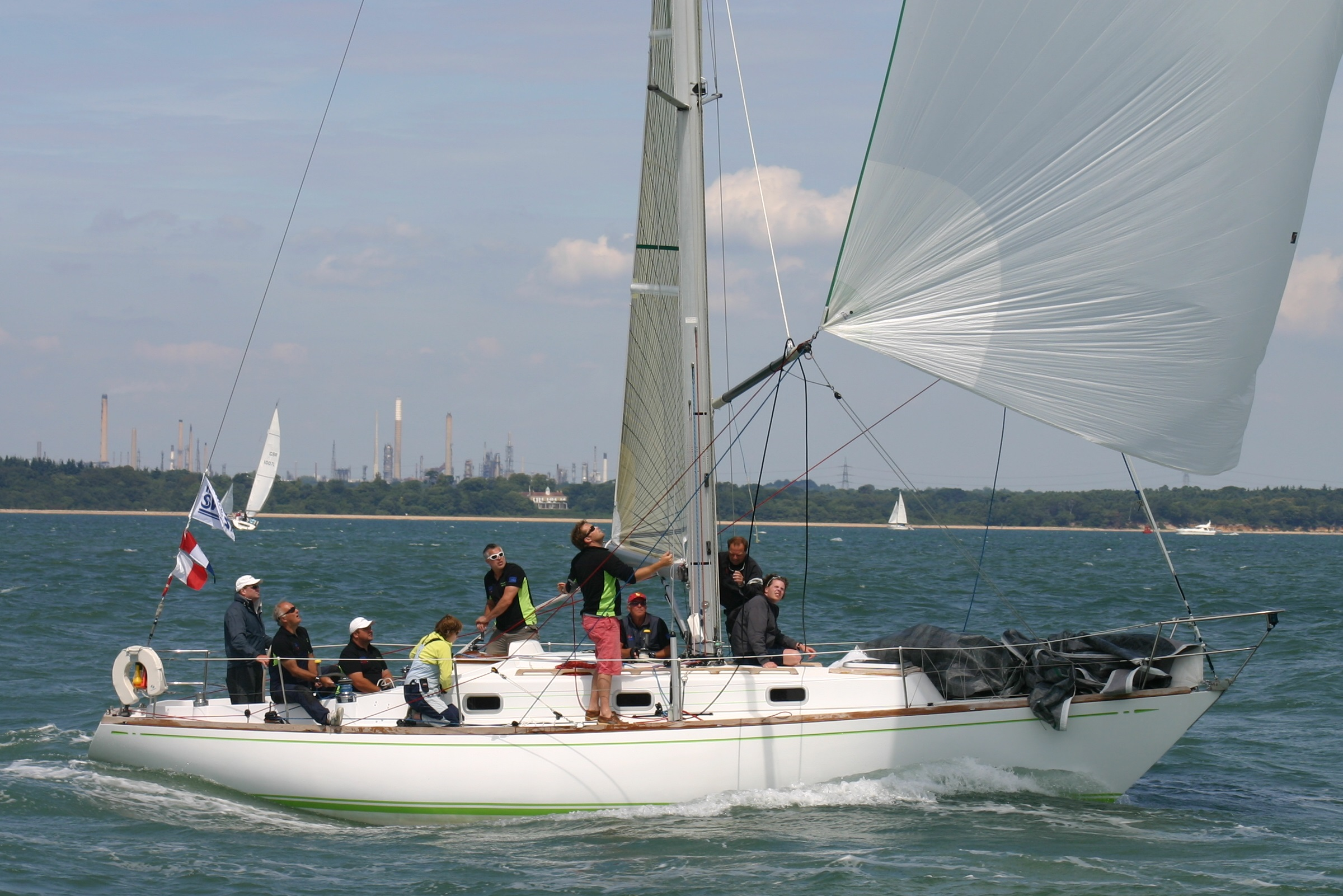
- Swan 37 No.013 AlvineXV GBR2881 at the 2011 Swan Europeans in Cowes (GBR) held by the Royal Yacht Squadron

Development
- Designer: Sparkman & Stephens
- Year: 1970 - 1975
- No. built: 59
- Brand: Swan
- Builder: Nautor Swan

Boat
- Displacement: 15,400 lb (7,000 kg)
- Draft: 6.4 feet (1.95 metres)
- Air draft: 46.25 ft 0 in (14.10 m)

Hull
- Construction: GRP
- LOA: 37 ft (11 m)
- LWL: 27 ft 4 in (8.33 m)
- Beam: 10 ft 0 in (3.05 m)

Hull appendages
- General: Fin keel with skeg hung rudder
- Keel: fin
- Ballast: 7,300 lb (3,300 kg)

Rig
- Rig type: Masthead Sloop
- I foretriangle height: 46 ft 3 in (14.10 m)
- J foretriangle base: 15 ft 7 in (4.75 m)
- P mainsail luff: 40 ft 7 in (12.37 m)
- E mainsail foot: 11 ft 8 in (3.56 m)
- Mast height: 46 ft 3 in (14.10 m)

Sails
- General: fore triangle 360.7 sq ft (33.51 m^{2})
- Mainsail area: 236.9 sq ft (22.01 m^{2})
- Spinnaker area: 1,299 sq ft (120.7 m^{2})

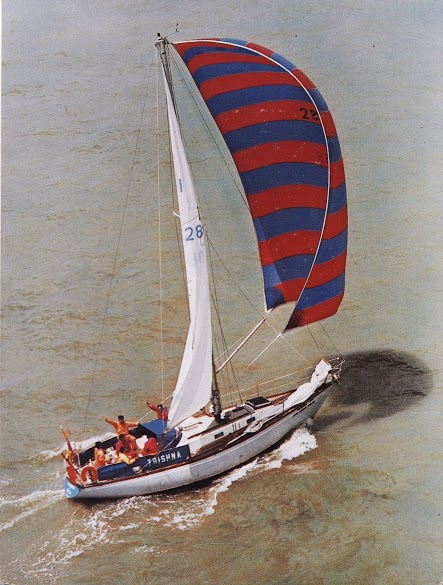

Swan 37 is a GRP constructed, fin keeled, one tonner masthead sloop and successor to the Swan 36. It was designed by Sparkman & Stephens and manufactured by Nautor Oy between 1970 and 1974 with total of 59 boats being built. Sparkman & Stephens designed the Americas Cup winner Intrepid (1967 and 1970) with a trim tab on the trailing edge of the keel. S&S used the same trim tab on at least some of the early Swan 37s. Measured by racing success, Swan 37 is one of the most successful Swan yachts ever built and it is famous for winning the Round Gotland Race on six occasions in four decades by a yacht called Tarantella II. At least two Swan 37 boats Dulcinea and Trishna are known to have circumnavigated the world. As part of that circumnavigation, Dulcinea participated in the Cape to Rio race in 1976. She is still actively sailed under the same name (as of 2017) in the US. In the US market Swan 37 was also marketed as Palmer Johnson 37.

== See also ==
- Trishna (yacht) Swan 37-109
