= Inderjit Badhwar =

Indian journalist (born 1943)

- Born: 1943 (age 82–83); Ujhani, Uttar Pradesh, India
- Education: Columbia University
- Occupation: Journalist

Inderjit Badhwar (born 1943) is an Indian journalist, novelist and the former editor of India Today.

He has written for various Indian and American newspapers and magazines, including The New York Times and Outlook.

Now based in New Delhi, Badhwar heads India Legal, India's first politico-legal weekly magazine.

== Bibliography ==
- Badhwar, Inderjit (2002). Sniffing Papa. India Research Press. ISBN 9788187943334.
- Badhwar, Inderjit (2004). Indira Gandhi: A Living Legacy. Timeless. ISBN 9788190236980.
- Badhwar, Inderjit (2004). The Chamber of Perfumes. India Research Pres. ISBN 9788187943617.
