= Karwan-e-Mohabbat =

Civilian campaign in India

- Peace Yatra
- Founded: 4 September 2017
- Location: India
- Members: unknown
- Website: karwanemohabbat.in

Karwan-e-Mohabbat (lit. 'Caravan of Love'), sometimes written as Karwan e Mohabbat, also known as Peace Yatra (Peaceful Journey), is a countrywide civilian campaign in India that was first launched in September 2017 in solidarity with the victims of mob lynching or victimised during the communal or religiously motivated violence. The campaign was actively conducted after a series of extrajudicial killings took place such as 2015 Dadri mob lynching, and later cow vigilante violence that resulted in several crimes, including mob lynching.

== Background ==
Karwan-e-Mohabbat idea was introduced by a human rights activist Harsh Mander. It was first launched in 2017 from a northeastern Indian state Assam and subsequently travelled across the multiple states, including Jharkhand, Karnataka, Uttar Pradesh, Gujarat and other states. It is run by the different People, including lawyers, activists, journalists. social workers, writers, photographers and students. The campaign claimed to have minimized the communal violence against the minorities, though coronavirus pandemic anti-Muslim riots occurred during the recent days in the country.

== Objectives ==
The Karwan-e-Mohabbat claimed that it had taken some initiatives to reduce violence by spreading awareness through consciousness raising or travelling around the country. The objectives of the people associated with campaign is to provide medical and legal aid to the victims' families. It also provides economic security to the affected families.
