= Badhwar Park =

Coordinates: 18°55′03.3″N 72°49′32.1″E

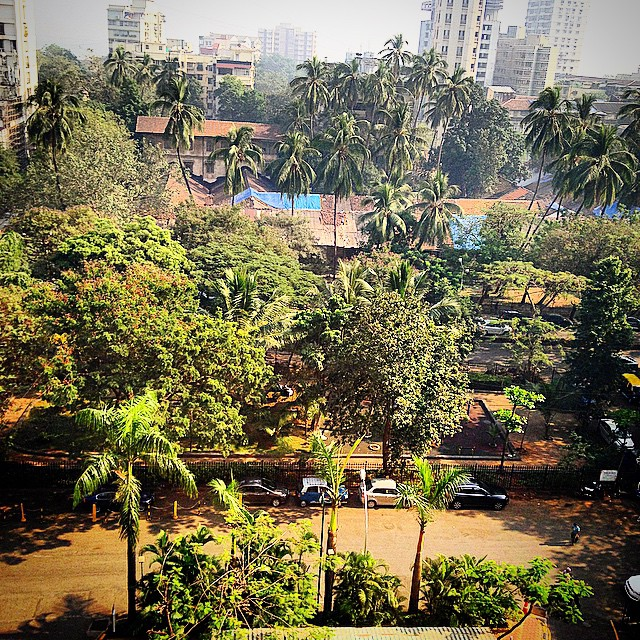
- Interactive map of Badhwar Park
- Country: India
- Founder: Shri Fateh Chand Badhwar

Badhwar Park is the residential complex of the Indian Central Railway and Western Railway officers. It is located at Wodehouse Road in Cuffe Parade. The colony is situated along the coastline. The complex has been aptly named after Shri Fateh Chand Badhwar, the first Indian chairman of the Indian Railway Board. Shri Omprakash Rai is the IOW of Badhwar Park. In the past, after its inception in 1925, all chairmen of the Railway Board had been Britons. The complex has a club with sports facilities and library. The club has coaching facilities for sports and martial arts. Badhwar Park can be reached from Churchgate or Chhatrapati Shivaji Terminus (CST) railway station by catching bus no 138 starting from CST (via Churchgate).

== History ==
During the British Raj in India, Colaba railway station was a terminus railway station; later it was converted into a residential complex for senior railway officers. At one point in time, Churchgate and Victoria Terminus (now CST) were not the southernmost endpoint for the Mumbai suburban railway lines. Rather, Colaba railway station was terminus of Western Railway line of Mumbai suburban railway. This station was demolished and rebuilt as Badhwar Park residential complex.

== 2008 Mumbai attacks ==
Badhwar Park was the location of landing of the 10 terrorists on the evening of 26 November 2008, who went on to kill 188 persons in Mumbai.
