= Corps of Engineers (India) =

Engineering arm of the Indian Army

Indian Army Corps of Engineers
- The logo of the Corps of Engineers
- Active: 1780 - Present
- Country: India
- Branch: Indian Army
- Garrison/HQ: New Delhi, India
- Mottos: Sarvatra (Ubique, Everywhere)
- Colors: Maroon and blue
- Engagements: First Anglo-Afghan War; Second Anglo-Afghan War; First World War; Second World War; Burma Campaign; Sino-Indian War; Indo-Pak War-1947; Indo-Pak War-1965; Indo-Pak War-1971; Kargil War

Commanders
- Engineer-in-Chief: Lieutenant General Vikas Rohella, SM**

Insignia
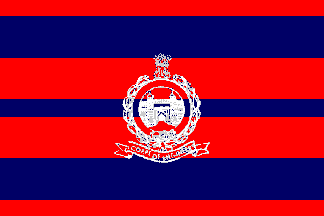
- Regimental flag

The Indian Army Corps of Engineers is a combat support arm which provides combat engineering support, develops infrastructure for armed forces and other defence organisations and maintains connectivity along the borders, besides helping the civil authorities during natural disasters. College of Military Engineering, Pune (CME) is the premier technical and tactical training institution of the Indian Army Corps of Engineers.

The Corps consists of three groups of combat engineers, namely the Madras Sappers, the Bengal Sappers and the Bombay Sappers.

It has a long history dating back to the mid-18th century. The earliest existing subunit of the Corps (18 Field Company) dates back to 1777 while the Corps officially recognises its birth as 1780 when the senior-most group of the Corps, the Madras Sappers were raised. A group is roughly analogous to a brigade of the Indian infantry, each group consisting of a number of engineer regiments. The engineer regiment is the basic combat engineer unit, analogous to an infantry battalion. Besides the combat engineers, the Corps mans and operates major engineering organisations such as the Military Engineer Services, the Border Roads Organisation (BRO), the Married Accommodation Project and the Military Survey.

== History ==
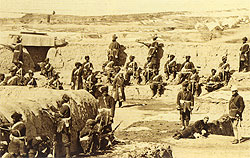
Corps of Bengal Sappers and Miners guarding their sector of the Sherpore Cantonment, outside the city boundary of Kabul, Afghanistan, during the Afghan War 1878–9.

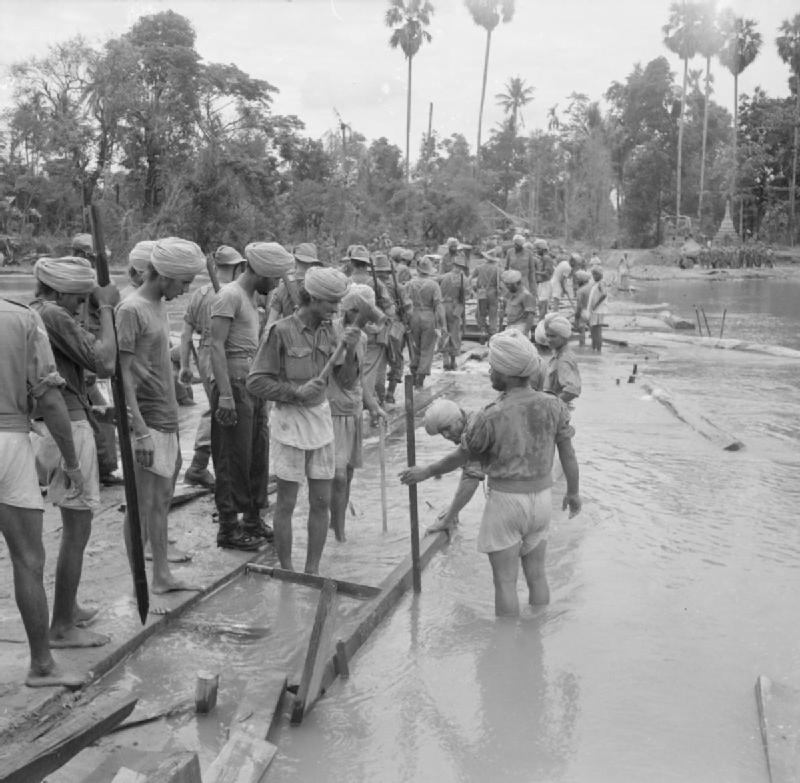
Indian engineers construct a wooden bridge during the advance to Rangoon, Burma Campaign.

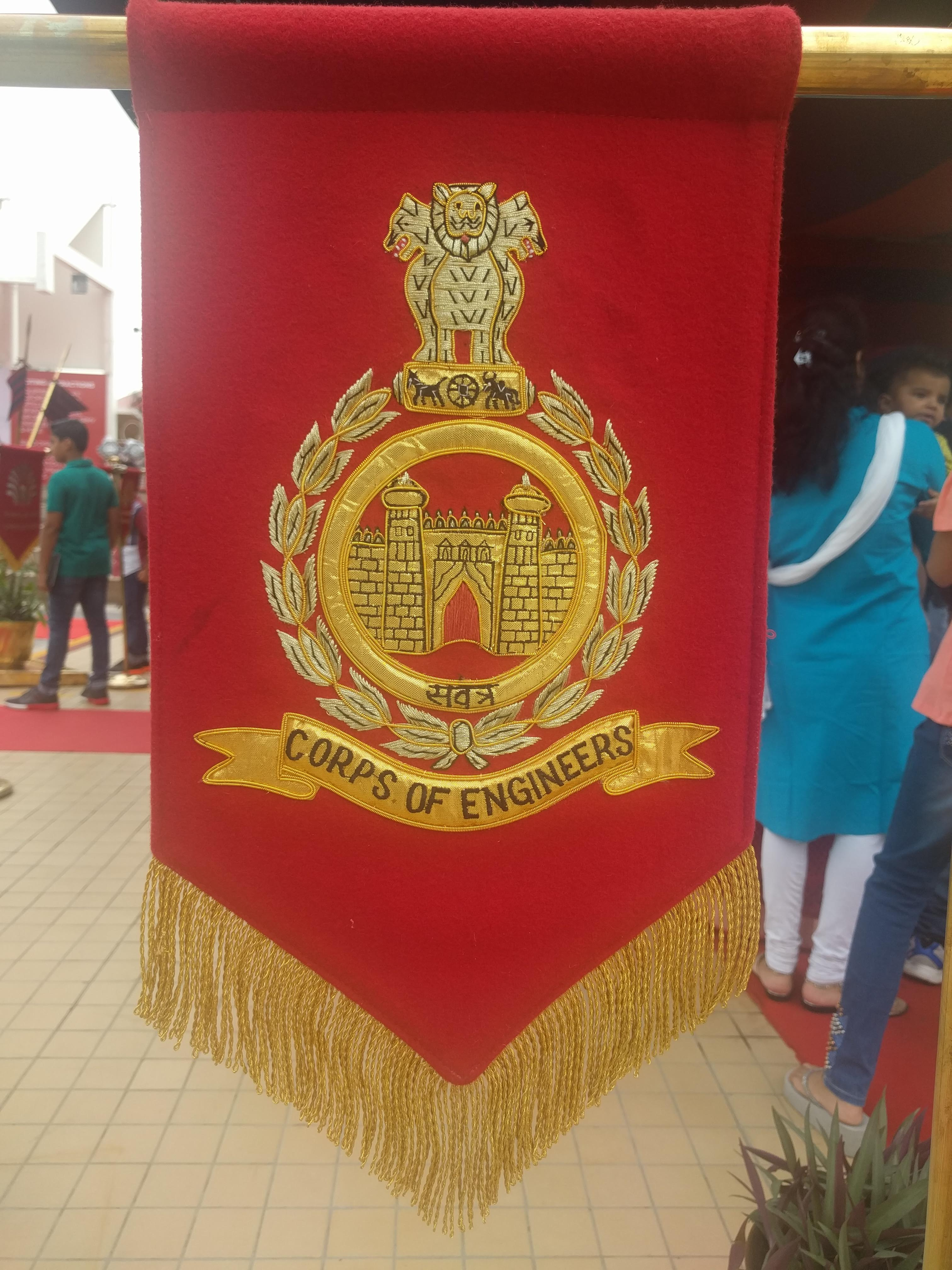
Indian Army Corps of Engineers insignia.

The Corps of Engineers is one of the oldest arms of the Indian Army. The origin of the Corps dates back to 1780 when the two regular pioneer companies were raised in the Madras Presidency Army. Subsequently, the Group of Madras, Bengal and Bombay Sappers were formed in their respective presidencies. These Groups came together when the British Indian Army was formed after 1857 and were later merged on 18 November 1932 to form the Corps of Indian Engineers. Engineer Groups initially consisted of field companies (a sub-unit organisation that exists to this day).

Till 1911, the Sappers also had the duty of passing battlefield messages. Between 1911 and 1920, they handed this task to a batch of their own kinsmen who then formed the Corps of Signals. The Sappers also contributed the first batch of airmen when the Indian Air Force was raised in 1932. From 1942 to 1945 officers of the Indian Railways were recruited into this Corps to participate in Britain's Burma Campaign.

After Partition in 1947, British officers continued to hold the post of Engineer-in-Chief until 1957, when a Ceylonese officer assumed the role for three years. In 1960 the appointment finally passed to an Indian when Major General Harkirat Singh, KCIO, took command; he served as Engineer-in-Chief until 1965 and oversaw a significant expansion of both the Corps of Engineers and the newly established Border Roads Organisation.

== Combat Engineers ==
In war, Combat Engineers provide mobility to own forces by constructing bridges, tracks and helipads; on the other hand, the Corps denies the same to the enemy by creating obstacles such as laying mine-fields and demolition of bridges. The need for accurate survey arose before combat engineering. Vast holdings had to be carefully delineated and mapped out, to plan the correct form of commercial extraction. By 1780, serious attention began to be given to the art of sapping and mining.

Forts abound in the subcontinent, and to the forts the main defences withdrew for a protracted stand. On being invested, the siege (heavy) artillery including trench mortars or bombards went at it. The real work, not for the faint-hearted, went to the sappers who had to do the 'sapping' or mining. Sapping is the technique of accurately digging trenches, usually covered or zigzag, to cover one's approach to the point of assault.

Corps of Engineers played a very important role on "OP Vijay" the Kargil war. The major Engineer Regiments which very actively took part were 108 Engineer Regiment as a part of 08 Mountain Division, 02 Engineer Regiment as a part of 03 Mountain Division, 106 Engineer Regiment as a part of 15 Corps and 112 Engineer as a part of 92 Mountain Brigade during the operation, subsequently becoming a part of the newly raised 14 Corps. The action areas and the commanding officers of these Engineer Regiments are mentioned below:-

1. 108 Engr. Regt. Commanded by Col. Rohit Mohan Chaudhri. The Regt. operated in Drass sector under 08 Mtn. Div. The unit was awarded a Battle Honour, theatre Honour, and the COAS Unit Citation for War.

2. 02 Engr. Regt. Commanded by Col. Krishnan, operating initially in Drass sector then Chor Batala and Siachin sector under 03 Mtn. Div. The unit was awarded theatre honour.

3. 106 Engr. Regt. Commanded by Col. I.P.S. Ahuja, operating in Drass & Kargil sectors under 16 Corps HQ. The unit was awarded COAS Unit Citation of War.

4. 112 Engr. Regt. Commanded by Col. N.B.Saxena, operating in Daha & Ganasak sector under 92 Mtn. Bde., brought in for operations from 33 Corps located in Sukhna. The unit was awarded COAS Unit Citation of War.

== Military Engineer Services ==
The Military Engineer Services (MES) are responsible for the design, construction and maintenance of all works, buildings, airfields, dock installations, etc., together with accessory services such as military roads, water and electric supply, drainage, refrigeration, and furniture, required by the Army, Navy, Air Force & Coast Guard in India.

It is one of the largest construction and maintenance agencies in India with a total annual budget to the tune of ₹ 13,000 crores. It has a large number of units and sub-units spread across the entire country to provide engineering support to various formations of Army, Air Force, Navy and DRDO. MES is an inter services organisation under the Ministry of Defence and has both Army and Civilian components of officers (mainly IDSE) and other subordinate staff.

== Border Roads Organisation ==
The Border Roads Organisation (BRO) consists of Border Roads Development Board (BRDB) and General Reserve Engineer Force (GREF). BRDB is headed by the Defence Minister of India as its chairman; the Chief of Army Staff, Chief of Air Staff and Defence Secretary are its members, in addition to other members. GREF is headed by a Director General of Border Roads (DGBR) -- a Lt General of the Corps of Engineers.

The BRO was started on 7 May 1960. Its first DGBR was Maj Gen K N Dubey. Since then, BRO has made its own contribution to the nation by constructing national highways, airfields, buildings and bridges. The Border Roads, by constructing a large number of roads in once inaccessible areas of the Himalayas, Rajasthan and Northeast India have contributed significantly to their economic development. On 19 Jan 2024, Indian Defence Minister inaugurated 35 projects to be built by BRO in Indian border areas. The project sites were spread across multiple states namely Jammu and Kashmir, Ladakh, Arunachal Pradesh, Uttarakhand, Sikkim, Mizoram and Himachal Pradesh and were all constructed under challenging weather conditions at the most inhospitable terrain.

== Decorations ==
Lt Gen PS Bhagat of the Corps remains the first Indian Officer to have won the Victoria Cross in the Second World War. Another first in the same war, Subedar Subramaniam was awarded the George Cross. Later, during operations in Kashmir soon after Independence, Major Rama Raghoba Rane was awarded the Param Vir Chakra for making a passage through enemy minefields while crawling in front of a tank. Engineer units have been deployed abroad as part of UN Missions.

The Corps of Engineers has to its credit one Param Vir Chakra, two Maha Vir Chakras, 25 Vir Chakras, one Ashoka Chakra, 13 Kirti Chakras, 93 Shaurya Chakras, 38 Param Vishisht Seva Medals, 88 Ati Vishisht Seva Medals, one Padma Bhushan, three Padma Shris, six Yudh Seva Medals, among other awards.

9 Engineer Regiment became one of the youngest Engineer Regiment in world history to enter the battlefield and got as many as 12 decorations including 01 Mahavir Chakra, 03 Vir Chakra, 04 Sena Medal, 04 Mention in Dispatch at the "Battle of Basantar" in 1971. 107 Engineer Regiment gained an Indian Institute of Bridging Engineers award for constructing a bridge in Himachal Pradesh in 2001. 268 Engineer Regiment was raised in 1964. As of 2009 it is based 'somewhere in the western sector'. 69 Engineer Regiment was raised in 2005. As of 2006 it is based at Chandigarh.

Engineer regiments that served with the Indian Peace Keeping Force in Sri Lanka included the 3, 4, 8, 16, 51, 53, 110, 115 and 270.

General Manoj Pande became the first Chief of the Army Staff from the Corps of Engineers on 1 May 2022.

== See also ==
- Regiments of the Corps of Engineers
- Naib Subedar Gurnam Singh
- First Indian circumnavigation
- Trishna
