= Barrington Irving =

Jamaican-born American aviator

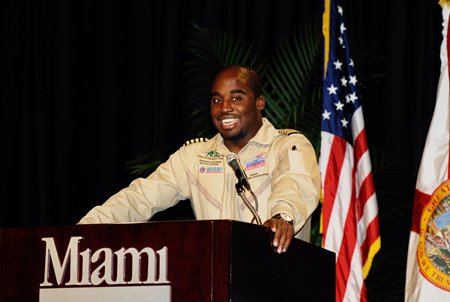
- Barrington Irving in 2008
- Born: Barrington Irving, Jr. November 11, 1983 (age 43); Kingston, Jamaica
- Known for: Formerly youngest person to circumnavigate the world solo First black person to circumnavigate the world
- Awards: Jamaica - Order of Distinction, Commander Class (2007); United States - 110th Congress, House Resolution 601 (2007)

Captain Barrington Irving Jr. CD (born November 11, 1983) is a Jamaican-born American pilot who previously held the record for the youngest person to pilot a plane around the world solo, a feat he accomplished in 2007. He is also the first black person and first Jamaican to accomplish this feat. His aircraft, a Columbia 400 (Cessna Corvalis 400), is named the "Inspiration." It was manufactured and assembled by the Columbia Aircraft Mfg. Co. in 2005, using over $315,000 in donated parts, and is classified as a standard aircraft in the utility category.

== Early life and education ==
Irving was born in Kingston, Jamaica, where he lived until the age of six. He grew up in Miami Florida, with parents Barrington Irving and Clovalyn Irving. Barrington grew up believing college football was his only avenue to higher education. At age 13, Irving met United Airlines Pilot Captain Gary Robsinson, who talked to Barrington about his career. Their discussions showed Barrington the potential for an aviation career.

As a student at Miami Northwestern Senior High School, Irving turned down multiple Division 1 football scholarship offers to pursue his passion for flight. He studied at Broward Community College and Florida Memorial University, where he graduated with a Bachelor's in Aeronautical Science, Magna Cum Laude. At Florida Memorial University, Irving earned his Private, Commercial, and Certified Flight Instructor licenses with an Instrument Rating.

== Career ==
On 23 March 2007, while still an undergraduate student at Florida Memorial University, Irving flew a Columbia 400, a single-engine aircraft named "Inspiration", solo around the world. He arrived back on 27 June 2007, having completed the 24,600-mile circumnavigation. Upon completing the trip, Irving, who was 23 years old at the time, became the first black person to circumnavigate the globe and, at the time, also the youngest person to do so. The completion of the flight earned Barrington a title in the Guinness Book of Records.

Through his platform, Captain Irving founded The Flying Classroom and Experience Aviation to invest in and aid young professionals in STEM+ and aviation careers. The Flying Classroom, LLC, launched in 2013, is a K-12 integrative STEM+ supplemental curriculum to educate and connect young professionals to STEM+ and aviation careers. Its proprietary platform allows students to explore over 55 STEM-focused global expeditions and access 165 virtual lessons.

In the fall of 2022, Irving announced his plans to partner with industry stakeholders to build an aviation workforce training center in Miami. The training center will aim to increase the number of young professionals in the business aviation industry, with an initial focus on maintenance-related careers.

Experience Aviation, founded in 2005, is a 501 (c) (3) non-profit organization based at Opa-Locka Executive Airport that utilizes aviation to build STEM skills in students to address the shortage of STEM professionals by engaging in STEM-related industry challenges. It aims to bring hands-on, project-based, and interactive STEM experiences to young people, such as building hovercraft, aircraft, and supercars, across the nation.

Irving's record was broken in 2012 by 22-year-old Swiss pilot Carlo Schmid, in 2014 by 19-year-old American pilot Matt Guthmiller, and in 2022 by 17-year old British-Belgian pilot Mack Rutherford.

== In the Media ==
In October 2022, Titans of Business Aviation, Capt. Barrington Irving and Community Partners announced the Launch of a Business Aviation Professional and Technical Aviation Training Center.

In 2019, Flying Classroom partnered with Bombardier, Inc. to launch The Flying Classroom Bombardier Academy to familiarize college students, military veterans, and technical school students with business aviation careers in maintenance.

August 2018, Capt. Irving lands STEM in Opa-locka. Captain Barrington Irving will oversee vocational programming and training for area youth and college students.

== Publications ==
Documenting Irving's historical global flight and achievements, Scholastic published Captain Barrington's autobiography, Touch the Sky, which aims to inspire underrepresented kids to pursue their dreams.

== Awards and recognition ==
In 2007, Irving became the first black person to fly solo around the world, a feat which enlisted him in the Guinness Book of World Records. As a celebrated aviator, Barrington has been recognized by leaders like President Barack Obama and has received a Congressional Resolution for his pioneering work in education in technology. In 2012, Irving was recognized as an Emerging Explorer by National Geographic. Among other honors, Irving holds the NASA Trailblazer Award and the NBAA 2019 American Spirit Award.

== Personal life ==
Irving currently resides in Miami, Florida with his wife and four children.

== Mentorship ==
Barrington Irving served as a mentor to Shaesta Waiz, the first civilian female commercial pilot from Afghanistan and the record-holder of the 8th woman to fly solo around the world in a single-engine aircraft.
