= Zara Rutherford =

Belgian-British aviator (born 2002)

- Born: 5 July 2002 (age 23)
- Education: St Swithun's School, Winchester
- Known for: Youngest female pilot to fly solo around the world
- Relatives: Mack (brother)
- Website: flyzolo.com

Zara Rutherford (born 5 July 2002) is a Belgian-British aviator. At age 19, she became the youngest female pilot to fly solo around the world and the first person to complete a circumnavigation in a microlight aircraft after a five-month journey which began in Kortrijk, Belgium, on 18 August 2021, and ended on 20 January 2022.

== Early life ==
Zara Rutherford was born in Belgium. She is the daughter of a British ex-Army helicopter pilot, Sam Rutherford and Belgian recreational pilot and lawyer Beatrice De Smet. She grew up with and around planes as her father Sam Rutherford, organised adventurous flying rallies and expeditions such as the Crete2Cape VintageAirRally, a crossing of the whole of Africa with vintage biplanes.

As a young girl, Rutherford would accompany her parents on many flights, even for a crossing of Mozambique, sometimes flying part of the way herself. At the age of 14, she began training to become a pilot and gained her pilot's license in 2020.

Zara and her brother Mack, also a world-record holding pilot, come from a long line of aviators going back five generations. Her maternal grandfather and great-grandfather were private pilots and her paternal great-great-grandmother, Margaret Jean Thomas, was amongst the first South-African women to learn to fly. Her great-grand uncle, Rae ('Tommy') Thomas, Margaret's son, flew a Catalina during the Second World War and died in combat at the age of 23.

== Solo flight around the world ==
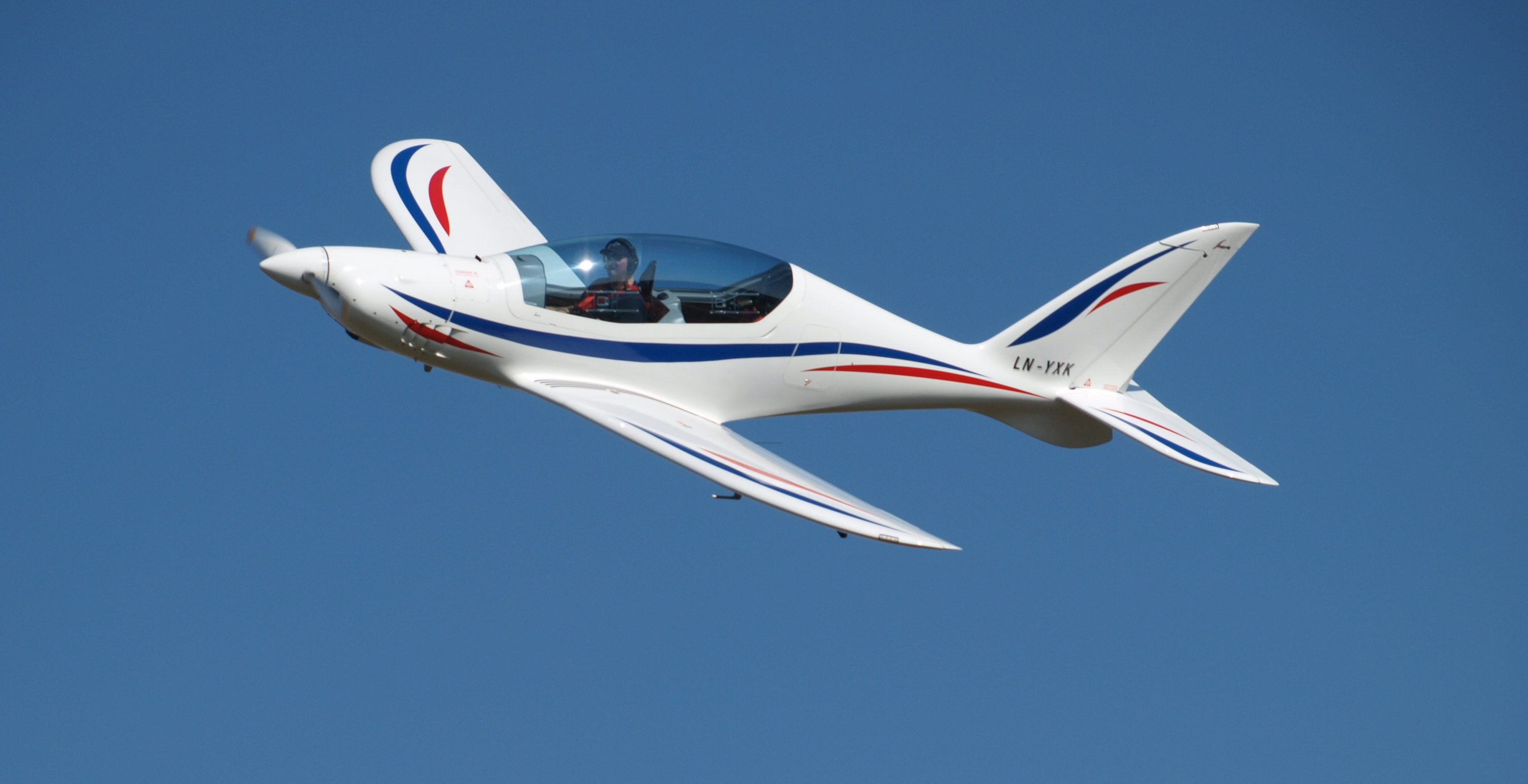
A Shark.Aero Shark UL plane similar to the one flown by Zara Rutherford.

On 26 July 2021, at a press conference at Popham Airfield near Winchester, Rutherford announced her bid to become the youngest female pilot to fly solo around the world, at the age of 19. She aimed to break the record previously set by American pilot Shaesta Waiz, who achieved the record in 2017 at the age of 30. Aside from this record, she also attempted to break two other records—to become the first woman to circumnavigate the world in a microlight aircraft and the first Belgian to circumnavigate the world solo in a single-engine aircraft. The record-breaking attempt was also meant to raise awareness about the gender gap in fields like science, technology, engineering and mathematics (STEM) and aviation, and to inspire more women and girls to be involved in STEM fields early. Her attempt was supported by main sponsor ICDSoft, a Bulgarian web hosting service, Richard Branson's Virgin Group, Belgian start-up SafeSky, and Dutch staffing and recruitment company TMC Group. She also partnered with charities Girls Who Code and Dreams Soar, which aim to inspire and help women and girls to enter into STEM fields.

Rutherford began her solo attempt from Kortrijk-Wevelgem Airport in Belgium on 18 August 2021 aboard a Shark UL aircraft, which was loaned to her by the Slovakian manufacturer Shark.Aero. From Kortrijk, she flew to Popham Airfield where she spent an hour before flying to Wick in Scotland via Aberdeen. The following day, she landed in Reykjavík, Iceland, after a five-hour flight.

After starting her journey, Rutherford made stops in Greenland, Canada, the East Coast of the United States, The Bahamas, Turks and Caicos, British Virgin Islands, Colombia, Panama, Costa Rica, Mexico, the West Coast of the United States, and the US state of Alaska. After arriving in Nome, Alaska, on 30 September 2021, she was forced to wait a week for her Russian visa to be renewed. By the time her passport arrived back from the Russian consulate in Houston, Texas, the weather had turned bad and she had to wait another three weeks before she could cross the Bering Strait, time spent in part carrying out maintenance. On 1 November 2021, she finally reached Anadyr, Russia—the halfway point of her journey. From Anadyr, she flew to Magadan on the following day, and on 9 November, she stopped at Ayan—a town with only 800 people, none of whom spoke English, and which had no Wi-Fi service—where she was stuck again due to a winter storm. She finally reached Khabarovsk on 30 November and Vladivostok on 2 December.

After flying from Russia on 11 December 2021, Rutherford intended to make stops in China, but because of the country's strict COVID-19 restrictions she was forced to make a detour over the Sea of Japan and fly to South Korea instead. During the six-hour flight, she had difficulty contacting air traffic controllers in Seoul and she sought the help of a KLM commercial pilot who forwarded her messages to air traffic control and helped her find the correct frequencies. She landed in Gimpo on the same day. On 13 December, she departed for a stop at Muan before flying the following day to Taipei, Taiwan. On 16 December, Rutherford landed in Clark, Pampanga, in the Philippines. She intended to make a second stop in Dumaguete but had to fly the following day to Kota Kinabalu, Malaysia, so as to avoid the approaching Typhoon Rai.

From Kota Kinabalu, she made stops in Ketapang and Jakarta in Indonesia and Seletar in Singapore. During the flight to Banda Aceh on 27 December, she flew too close to a thunderstorm and saw lightning bolts some 3 kilometres (1.9 mi) from her. After Banda Aceh, she made stops in Colombo, Sri Lanka, and Coimbatore, India. After stopping for the New Year in Mumbai, Rutherford began 2022 with stops in Al Ain in the United Arab Emirates and in Riyadh and Tabuk in Saudi Arabia where she was welcomed by Saudi prince and former pilot and astronaut Sultan bin Salman Al Saud. After a stop in Alexandria, Egypt, on 8 January 2022, she arrived at Heraklion on the Greek island of Crete for another stop.

Rutherford made stops in Sofia, Bulgaria, on 14 January 2022; in Senica, Slovakia; and in Benešov, Czech Republic, on 16 January. She landed at Frankfurt Egelsbach Airport, Germany, on 19 January. Arriving in Kortrijk, Belgium, on 20 January 2022, she completed a circumnavigation of the world and landed at the same airport from which she began the trip. Zara is a member of the Experimental Aircraft Association Chapter 838 in Racine, Wisconsin.

== After the solo flight ==
On 23 March 2022, Zara's younger brother, Mack Rutherford at the age of 16, began his own round-the-world trip in an ultralight aircraft. Zara's brother became the youngest person to fly around the world five months later when he arrived as his starting point of Sofia on 24 August to break the Guinness World record previously held by compatriot Travis Ludlow.

== Awards ==
In June 2022, Deutz AG honoured Zara with the 2022 Nicolaus August Otto Award followed in August 2022 by the Baron Hilton Award of the Living Legends of Aviation, taking place at Scalaria, near Salzbourg Austria, with a Red Bull Air Display.

On 12 September 2022, the Honourable Company of Air Pilots announced that, jointly with her brother Mack, she had been awarded the Master's Medal "in recognition of her amazing feat of flying and endurance".

In 2023, the Royal Automobile Club's Segrave Trophy was also presented to her (and her brother Mack), the youngest woman and youngest person respectively, to circumnavigate the globe. The trophy is awarded to the British national who demonstrates "Outstanding Skill, Courage and Initiative on Land, Water and in the Air" and is named in honour of Sir Henry Segrave, the first person to hold both the land and water speed records simultaneously.

== Education ==
Zara Rutherford completed her A levels in Mathematics, Further Mathematics, Economics and Physics at St. Swithun's School, a girls' school in Winchester, Hampshire, England.

She started her undergraduate studies at Stanford University in September 2022, and interviewed in 2023 she stated her interest in computer science, engineering, aeronautics and astronautics, and her plan to continue flying recreationally and become a flight instructor.

== Public speaking ==
Zara is currently also a public speaker signed up with Kruger Cowne. She has spoken at many events such as the Festival de las Ideas in Puebla, Mexico, FTI Supernova in Antwerp, Belgium, and the Misk "Generation Transformation" event in Riyadh, Saudi Arabia.

== Publishing ==
Rutherford's book I Flew Around the World recounts her solo flight. The book is published by DK publishing.

== See also ==
- List of circumnavigations
- List of women aviators
