= Shark.Aero Shark =

Slovakian light sport aircraft

Shark
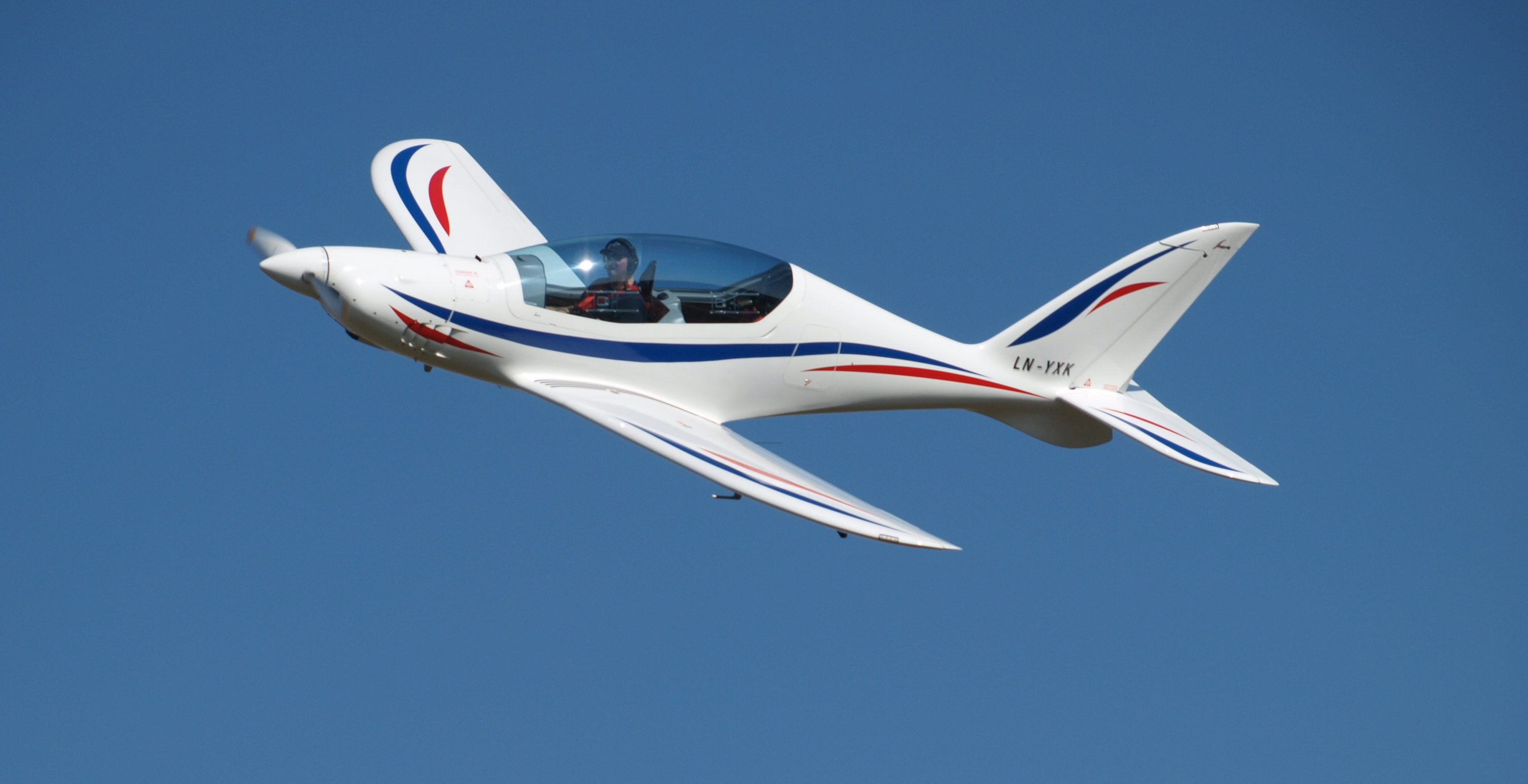

General information
- Type: Tandem seat ultralight aircraft
- National origin: Slovakia
- Manufacturer: Shark.Aero
- Designer: Jaroslav Dostál, Vlado Pekár
- Status: In production

History
- Manufactured: mid-2011-present
- First flight: 19 August 2009

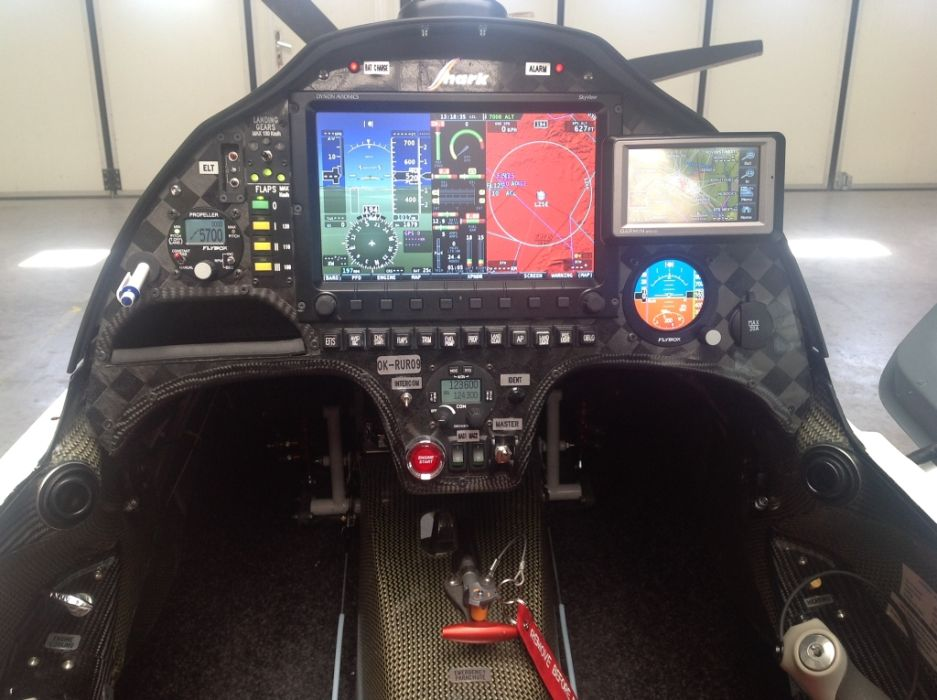
Shark instrument panel

The Shark.Aero Shark is a conventionally laid out, single engine, low wing ultralight aircraft and light-sport aircraft which seats two in tandem. It was first flown on 19 August 2009 and is built in both Slovakia and the Czech Republic by Shark.Aero. It has optionally fixed or retractable landing gear.

== Design and development ==
The Shark, which was formally announced at AERO Friedrichshafen in April 2007, was designed to fit into both European UL and US LSA categories. Structurally, it is a mixture of carbon-fibre and a small amount of glass fibre composites, with PVC foam filled aramid honeycomb structures sandwiched between panels. The wing main spar is a dismountable two-piece carbon fibre beam which joins under the front seat; an auxiliary spar carries the aileron and flap mountings. In plan, the leading edge is elliptical, and there is slight taper on the outer trailing edge where the ailerons are mounted. Single slotted, electrically operated flaps occupy the rest of the trailing edge. Like the wings, the slightly swept tailplanes are easily detached for storage or transport. There is an electrically operated trim tab in the elevator.

The fuselage of the Shark is formed with integral fin, seat backs, floors and instrument panel. The fin, set forward so the rudder trailing edge is above the elevator hinge line, is shaped like a shark's dorsal fin, strongly swept and with a curved leading edge. There is also a small ventral fin. From the fin forward the upper fuselage line rises rapidly to merge into the side hinged, single piece canopy. There is baggage space behind the cockpit. Both of the adjustable tandem seats have flight controls; the Shark is flown by a sidestick. It is powered by a 100 hp (75 kW) Rotax 912ULS or 115 hp (86 kW) Rotax 914 turbocharged powerplant, driving a three-blade or a two-blade propeller. The Shark UL has retractable gear and a variable-pitch propeller.

The prototype Shark, Czech registered as OK-OUR01, first flew on 19 August 2009. The first flight of the UL was expected early in 2010 but had not happened by January 2011.

The design entered production in mid-2011.

The Shark's wings and tail were adapted for use on the Slovenian OneAircraft One design.

== Operational history ==
The third Shark was registered in France as 83AJR with callsign F-JSOR in early 2011. It was destroyed whilst competing in the Paris-Madrid air race on 21 June 2011. It appears, however, that this aircraft was later rebuilt, as the callsign was noted using hex-code 381BBD from May 2015. The fourth appears on the Czech register, flying as a demonstrator in Germany.

In 2015, the design, equipped with a modified engine and a special DUC propeller, set a world record for class RAL2T (Microlights: Movable Aerodynamic Controls/Landplane/Flown with two persons/Thermal Engine) for speed over a straight course at 303.00 km/h (188.28 mph).

In 2021 and early 2022, 19-year-old British-Belgian pilot Zara Rutherford flew a Shark UL variant on an around-the-world flight. Rutherford set a new record for the youngest woman in history to carry out a solo circumnavigation and also the first woman to complete a circumnavigation in a microlight aircraft.

On 24 August 2022, Zara's brother, Mack Rutherford, age 17, landed in Sofia, Bulgaria, thus becoming the youngest pilot to fly solo around the world. Like his sister, Rutherford flew a modified Shark.

In June 2025, an electronic warfare version intended for radio jamming of combat drones was delivered to Ukraine.

== Variants ==
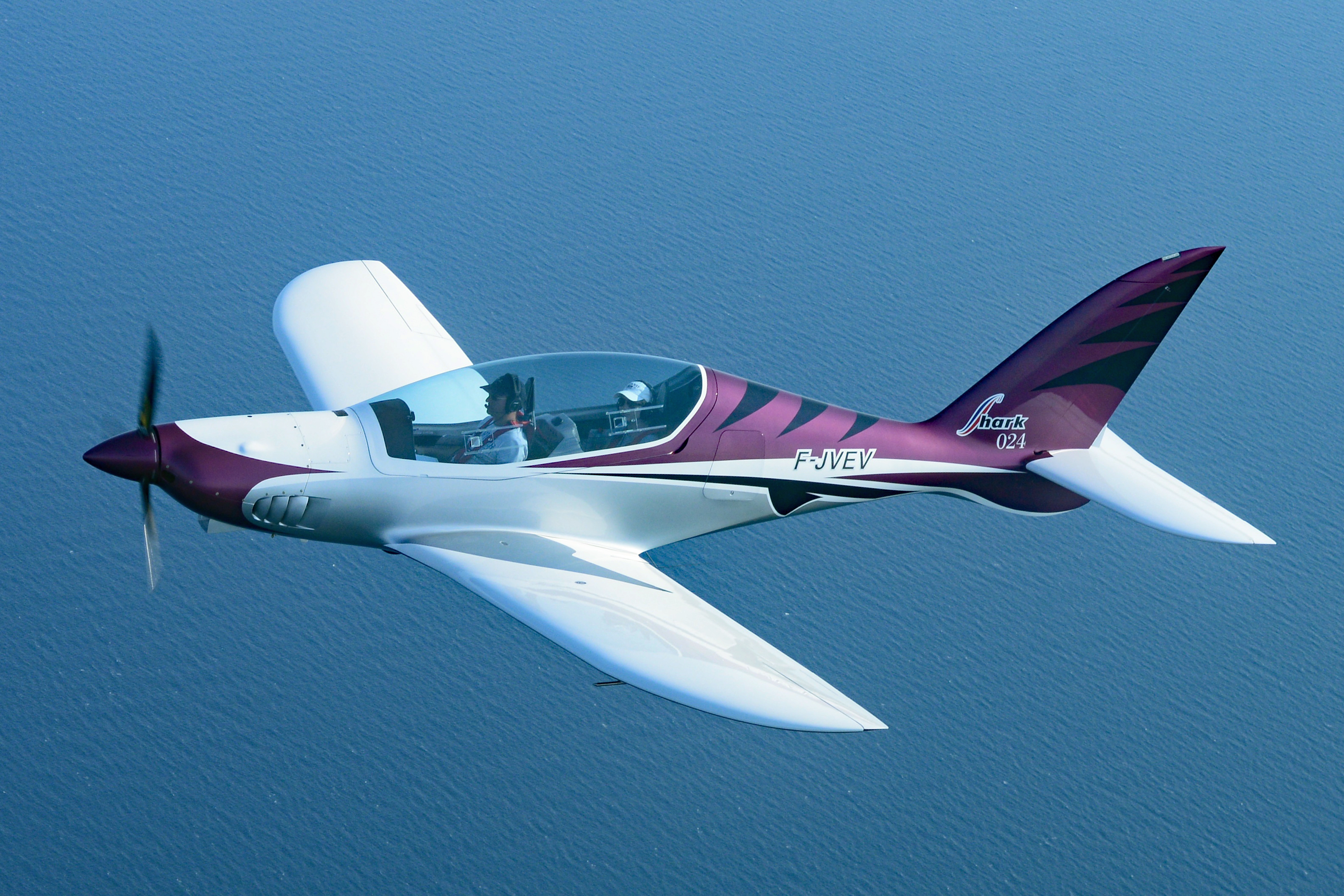
Shark UL

Shark LS
European UL, fixed undercarriage, fixed-pitch propeller.
Shark UL
European UL, retractable undercarriage, variable-pitch propeller.
SportShark
Planned US light-sport aircraft (LSA), longer span and heavier, with fixed undercarriage. Announced in 2011, by June 2022 it was not listed as an accepted US LSA.
Shark 600, retractable undercarriage, constant-speed propeller, mLSA eligible, 600 kg / 1323 lb gross weight.

== Specifications (UL) ==
Data from Jane's All the World's Aircraft 2011/12 and manufacturer

General characteristics

- Crew: one
- Capacity: one passenger
- Length: 6.715 m (22 ft 0 in)
- Wingspan: 7.90 m (25 ft 11 in)
- Height: 2.51 m (8 ft 3 in)
- Wing area: 9.50 m^{2} (102.3 sq ft)
- Empty weight: 275 kg (606 lb)
- Max takeoff weight: 472.5 kg (1,042 lb)
- Fuel capacity: 100 L (26.4 US gal, 22.0 Imp gal)
- Powerplant: 1 × Rotax 912ULS flat-four, air and liquid cooled., 73.5 kW (98.6 hp)
- Propellers: 3-bladed Duc Hélices variable pitch composite, Woodcomp 2 blade hydraulic.

Performance

- Maximum speed: 300 km/h (190 mph, 160 kn)
- Cruise speed: 250 km/h (160 mph, 130 kn) economical
- Stall speed: 64 km/h (40 mph, 35 kn) flaps down
- Never exceed speed: 333 km/h (207 mph, 180 kn)
- Range: 2,500 km (1,550 mi, 1,350 nmi) 40 gallon tanks
- Service ceiling: 4,100 m (13,500 ft)
- g limits: +4/−2
- Rate of climb: 7.4 m/s (1,460 ft/min) max, at sea level

Avionics

- EFIS-Dynon SkyView, Garmin G3X
- EMS-D120
