= 2016 in air sports =

== Paragliding ==
=== Paragliding World Cup ===
- March 9 – 16: 2016 Paragliding World Cup Brazil in Castelo
  - Overall winner: (Spain) Félix Rodriguez (4450 points)
  - Women's winner: (Japan) Keiko Hiraki (4066 points)
- June 4 – 11: 2016 Paragliding World Cup - Italy in Gemona del Friuli
  - Overall winner: (Germany) Andreas Malecki (1463 points)
  - Women's winner: (Italy) Silvia Buzzi Ferraris (1345 points)
- July 1 – 9: 2016 Paragliding World Cup - Portugal in Serra da Estrela
  - Overall winner: (Brazil) Donizete Baldessar Lemos (2447 points)
  - Women's winner: (Japan) Keiko Hiraki (2172 points)
- September 3 – 10: 2016 Paragliding World Cup - France in Saint-André-les-Alpes
  - Overall winner: (France) Maxime Pinot (2184 points)
  - Women's winner: (United Kingdom) Kirsty Cameron (1496 points)
- October 1 – 8: 2016 Paragliding World Cup (final) in (Réunion) Saint-Leu
  - Overall winner: (Switzerland) Michael Küffer (2832 points)
  - Women's winner: (Poland) Klaudia Bulgakow (2259 points)

=== Paragliding Accuracy World Cup ===
- May 5 – 8: Paragliding Accuracy World Cup #1 in (Montenegro) Berane
  - Overall winner: (Serbia) Goran Đurković
  - Women's winner: (Serbia) Tamara Kostić
- May 10 – 15: Paragliding Accuracy World Cup #2 in (Albania) Vlorë
  - Overall winner: (North Macedonia) Mile Jovanoski
  - Women's winner: (Serbia) Tamara Kostić
- August 5 – 7: Paragliding Accuracy World Cup #3 in (Indonesia) Lombok
  - Overall winner: (Indonesia) Permadi Chandra
  - Women's winner: (Thailand) Nunnapat Phuchong
- August 11 – 15: Paragliding Accuracy World Cup #4 in (Chinese Taipei) Taitung County
  - Overall winner: (China) Zhifeng Zhu
  - Women's winner: (Thailand) Nunnapat Phuchong

=== International and Continental events ===
- May 27 – June 3: 3rd FAI Asian Paragliding Accuracy Championship in (Kazakhstan) Taldykorgan
  - Overall winner: (Thailand) Tanapat Leangaiem
  - Teams winner: China
- July 10 – 17: 5th FAI European Paragliding Accuracy Championship in (Lithuania) Paluknys
  - Men's winner: (Slovenia) Matjaž Sluga
  - Women's winner: (Serbia) Tamara Kostić
- July 16 – 23: XXXIII Guarnieri International Trophy - Pre-World 2016 in (Italy) Pedavena
  - Overall winner: (Italy) Federico Nevastro
  - Women's winner: (France) Seiko Fukuoka-Naville
- August 8 – 20: 14th FAI European Paragliding Championship in (North Macedonia) Kruševo
  - Overall winner: (France) Honorin Hamard
  - Women's winner: (France) Seiko Fukuoka-Naville
  - Teams winners: France (Honorin Hamard, Julien Wirtz, Maxime Pinot, Pierre Remy, Alexandre Jofresa, Seiko Fukuoka-Naville)
- August 26 – September 4: 2nd FAI World Paragliding Championships in (France) Montmin / Doussard
  - Men's winner: (France) François Ragolski
  - Women's winner: (Austria) Christina Kolb

=== Parachuting ===
- January 15 – 17: Para-ski World Cup #1 in St Johann im Pongau/Alpendorf
  - Men's winner: (Slovenia) Ule Uroš
  - Women's winner: (Austria) Magdalena Schwertl
  - Junior mix winner: (Austria) Sebastian Graser
  - Master mix winner: (Austria) Alic Gernot
  - Overall teams winners: Austria
- February 19 – 21: Para-ski World Cup #2 in (Germany) Unterammergau
  - Men's winner: (Austria) Sebastian Graser
  - Women's winner: (Austria) Magdalena Schwertl
  - Junior mix winner: (Austria) Sebastian Graser
  - Master mix winner: (Italy) Marco Valente
  - Overall teams winners: Austria
- March 4 – 6: Para-ski World Cup #3 in (Czech Republic) Vrchlabí/Krkonoše
  - Men's winner: (Italy) Alessandro Di Prisco
  - Women's winner: (Austria) Magdalena Schwertl
  - Junior mix winner: (Austria) Sebastian Graser
  - Master mix winner: (Italy) Tomas Saurer
  - Overall teams winners: Slovenia
- no date set from #4 Para-ski World Cup in (Slovenia) Srednja Vas v Bohinju
- July 17 – 29: 40th CISM World Military Parachuting Championship in Kubinka
  - Individual Accuracy winners: (Russia) Dmitrii Mastafanov (m) / (Russia) Olga Lepezina (f)
  - Individual Style winners: (Czech Republic) Libor Jirousek (m) / (Russia) Olga Lepezina (f)
  - Overall Results winners: (Russia) Dmitrii Mastafanov (m) / (Russia) Olga Lepezina (f)
  - Junior Individual Style winners: (Russia) Andrey Izimetov (m) / (France) Léocadie Ollivier de Pury (f)
  - Junior Individual Accuracy winners: (China) Gao Tinabo (m) / (Belarus) Darja Shastakovich (f)
  - Junior Overall Results winners: (China) Gao Tinabo (m) / (Belarus) Darja Shastakovich (f)
  - Formation Skydiving winners: Belgium (m) / France (f)
  - Team Accuracy winners: Hungary (Tamas Banszki, Szaboles Gal, Gabor Hirschler, Tamás Varga, István Asztalos) (m) / Belarus (Nataliya Nikitsiuk, Yuliya Fiodarava, Aksana Famina, Natalia Zimina, Valeryia Osipava) (f)
  - Teams Overall Results winners: Russia (m) / Russia (f)
- August 20 – 27: 6th FAI World Canopy Piloting Championships in (Canada) Farnham
  - Overall winner: (United States) Christopher Bobo
  - Accuracy winners: (United States) Curtis Bartholomew & (France) Eric Philippe
  - Distance here was cancelled
  - Speed winner: (United States) Christopher Bobo
- September 11 – 20: 2016 FAI World Parachuting Championships - Mondial in (United States) Chicago
  - Freefall Style winners: (Czech Republic) Libor Jirousek (m) / (Russia) Olga Lepezina (f)
  - Speed Skydiving winner: (Sweden) Henrik Raimer

Accuracy Landing

  - Individual Accuracy Landing winners: (Slovenia) Uroš Ban (m) / (Belarus) Nataliya Nikitsiuk (f)
  - Junior Individual Accuracy winners: (Austria) Sebastian Graser (m) / (China) Tiantian ZHAO
  - Team Accuracy Landing winners: Slovenia (m) / China (f)

Formation Skydiving

  - 4 Way Formation winners: Belgium (m) / United States (f)
  - 8 Way Formation winners: United States
  - Vertical Formation winners: United States

Artistic Events

  - Artistic Freefly winners: Russia 1
  - Artistic Freestyle winners: France 2

Canopy Formation

  - 2 Way Sequential winners: France 1
  - 4 Way Sequential winners: Qatar
  - 4-Way Rotation winners: France
- October 11 – 16: 2nd FAI World Cup of Indoor Skydiving in Warsaw
  - Open Freestyle winner: (Finland) Inka Tiitto
  - Junior Freestyle winner: (Singapore) Kyra Poh
  - Dynamic 2-WAY winners: Poland
  - 4 Way Formation winners: Belgium (m) / France 1 (f); Junior winners: Canada
  - Vertical Formation winners: United States
- November 3 – 6: 1st FAI World Wingsuit Performance Flying Championships in (United States) Zephyrhills, Florida
  - Winner: (United States) Chris Geiler

=== Ultralight aviation ===
- June 9 – 18: 2nd FAI European Paramotor Slalom Championships in (Spain) Bornos
  - PF1 Class winner: (France) Alexandre Mateos
  - Trike Class winner: (France) Alexandre Mateos
  - Racing teams winners: (France) (Alexandre Mateos, Nicolas Aubert, Jérémy Penone, François Blanc)
  - Nations winners: (Poland) (Bartosz Nowicki, Wojtek Bógdał, Marcin Bernat, Paweł Kozarzewski, Piotr Ficek, Szymon Winkler, Krzysztof Romicki)
- August 20 – 27: 15th FAI World Microlight Championships in Popham Airfield
  - RAL 1 T winner: Czech Republic
  - RAL 2 T winner: United Kingdom
  - RGL 2 T winner: Hungary
  - RWL 1 T winner: United Kingdom
  - RWL 2 T winner: Russia
- August 20 – 27: 9th FAI World Paramotor Championships in (United Kingdom) Popham Airfield
  - Winners: France, 2. Czech Republic, 3. Poland

=== Hang gliding ===
- July 16 – 30: 19th FAI European Hang Gliding Class 1 Championship in (North Macedonia) Kruševo
  - Winner: (Italy) Christian Ciech
  - Team winners: Italy (Christian Ciech, Alessandro Ploner, Suan Selenati, Filippo Oppici, Tullio Gervasoni)
- July 17 – 30: 7th FAI World Hang Gliding Class 5 Championship in (North Macedonia) Kruševo
  - Winner: (Germany) Tim Grabowski
  - Team winners: Austria (Christopher Friedl, Wolfgang Kothgasser, Walter Geppert)

=== Gliding ===
==== Grand Prix gliding ====
- January 23 – 30: 2016 FAI Qualifying Sailplane GP #1 in (Chile) Vitacura
  - Winner: (Chile) Carlos Rocca
- April 17 – 23: 2016 FAI Qualifying Sailplane GP #2 in (Spain) Cerdanya
  - Winner: (France) Louis Bouderlique
- May 1 – 8: 2016 FAI Qualifying Sailplane GP #3 in (Russia) Usman
  - Winner: (Poland) Sebastian Kawa
- May 14 – 21: 2016 FAI Qualifying Sailplane GP #4 in (Italy) Varese
  - Winner: (Austria) Peter Hartmann
- June 4 – 11: 2016 FAI Qualifying Sailplane GP #5 in (France) Rennes
  - Winner: (France) Louis Bouderlique
- June 18 – 25: 2016 FAI Qualifying Sailplane GP #6 in (Austria) Niederöblarn
  - Winner: (Slovenia) Boštjan Pristavec
- July 9 – 17: 2016 FAI Qualifying Sailplane GP #7 in (United Kingdom) Bicester
  - Winner: (Germany) Jan Omsels
- July 24 – 31: 2016 FAI Qualifying Sailplane GP #8 in (United States) Ionia
  - Winner: (Canada) Jerzy Szemplinski
- August 6 – 13: 2016 FAI Qualifying Sailplane GP #9 in (Germany) Ebersbach-Musbach
  - Winner: (Germany) Matthias Sturm
- November 5 – 12: 7th FAI World Sailplane Grand Prix Championship in (South Africa) Potchefstroom
  - Winner: (Germany) Holger Karow

==== International Championships ====
- July 30 – August 13: 34th FAI World Gliding Championships in (Lithuania) Kaunas
  - Standard class winner: (France) Louis Bouderlique
  - Club class winner: (Germany) Jan Rothhardt
  - 20 metre Multi-Seat class winners: France (Duboc & Aboulin)

=== General aviation ===
- September 4 – 9: 20th FAI World Rally Flying Championship in (Portugal) Santa Cruz
  - Advanced Category winners: Czech Republic
  - Unlimited Category winners: France

==== 2016 Red Bull Air Race World Championship ====
    - March 11 & 12: WARC #1 in (United Arab Emirates) Abu Dhabi
      - Master Class winner: (France) Nicolas Ivanoff
      - Challenger Class winner: (Sweden) Daniel Ryfa
    - April 23 & 24: WARC #2 in (Austria) Spielberg
      - Master Class winner: (Germany) Matthias Dolderer
      - Challenger Class winner: (Germany) Florian Berger
    - June 4 & 5: WARC #3 in (Japan) Chiba
      - Master Class winner: (Japan) Yoshihide Muroya
      - Challenger Class winner: (Chile) Cristian Bolton
    - July 16 & 17: WARC #4 in (Hungary) Budapest
      - Master Class winner: (Germany) Matthias Dolderer
      - Challenger Class winner: (Sweden) Daniel Ryfa
    - August 13 & 14: WARC #5 in (United Kingdom) Ascot
      - Master Class winner: (Australia) Matt Hall
      - Challenger Class winner: (United States) Kevin Coleman
    - September 3 & 4: WARC #6 in (Germany) Lausitzring
      - Master Class winner: (Australia) Matt Hall
      - Chellenger winner: (Germany) Florian Bergér
    - October 1 & 2: WARC #7 in (United States) Indianapolis
      - Master Class winner: (Germany) Matthias Dolderer
      - Chellenger winner: (Poland) Luke Czepiela
    - October 15 & 16: WARC #9 in (United States) Las Vegas
      - Cancelled due to high winds.

=== Ballooning ===
- February 24 – 29: 3rd FAI European Hot Air Airship Championship in (Germany) Rottach-Egern
  - Winner: (Switzerland) Jacques-Antoine Besnard (6875 points)
- June 24 – July 4: 3rd FAI Junior World Hot Air Balloon Championship in (Lithuania) Marijampolė
  - Winner: (Lithuania) Rokas Kostiuškevičius (17035 points)
- July 5 – 10: 2nd FAI Women's World Hot Air Balloon Championship in (Lithuania) Birštonas
  - Winner: (Australia) Nicola Scaife (8713 points)
- July 21 – 24: 2016 Luxembourg Balloon Trophy in Mersch
  - Winners: 1. (Germany) Sven Göhler, 2. (Australia) Matthew Scaife, 3. (Belgium) David Spildooren
- September 15 – 24: 60th Coupe Aéronautique Gordon Bennett in (Germany) Gladbeck
  - Winners: Switzerland 1 (Kurt Frieden & Pascal Witpraechtiger)
  - 2nd place: Switzerland 2 (Nicolas Tièche & Laurent Sciboz)
  - 3rd place: Spain 1 (Anulfo Gonzalez & Angel Aguirre)
- October 30 – November 7: 22nd FAI World Hot Air Balloon Championship in (Japan) Saga
  - Winner: (United States) Rhett Heartsill

=== Aerobatics ===
- May 28: 2016 Sky GP in (South Africa) Durban
  - Winner: (South Africa) Patrick Davidson
- July 20 – 30: 7th FAI World Advanced Glider Aerobatic Championships in Matkopuszta
  - Winner: (Sweden) Sebastian Jansson
  - Team winners: Hungary (Dávid Józsa, Miklós Hoós, Péter Szabó)
- July 20 – 30: 19th FAI World Glider Aerobatic Championships in Matkopuszta
  - Winner: (Hungary) Ferenc Tóth
  - Teams winners: Hungary (Ferenc Tóth, János Szilágyi, János Sonkoly)
- August 4 – 14: 12th FAI World Advanced Aerobatic Championships in (Poland) Radom
  - Winner: (France) Loïc Lovicourt
  - Teams winners: France (Loïc Lovicourt, Romain Vienne, Benoît Faict)
- August 20 – 27: 20th FAI European Aerobatic Championships in (Czech Republic) Moravská Třebová
  - Winner: (Russia) Mikhail Mamistov
  - Teams winner: France (Olivier Masurel, Mikael Brageot, Alexandre Orlowski)

=== Model aircraft ===
- April 11– 16: 2016 FAI F1D World Championships for Free Flight Indoor Model Aircraft in (Romania) Slănic
  - Senior Individual winner: (United States) Yuan Kang Lee
  - Senior Teams winners: (Hungary) (Istvan Botos, Dezso Orsovai, Zoltan Sukosd)
  - Junior Individual winner: (Romania) Călin Bulai
  - Junior Teams winners: (Ukraine) (Vladyslav Klymenko, Iurii Vytko, Denis Zhariy)
- May 7 – 13: 2016 FAI F2 World Championships for Control Line Model Aircraft in (Australia) Perth
  - F2A winner: (United Kingdom) Paul Eisner
  - F2B winner: (United States) Orestes Hernández
  - F2C winners: (Australia) (Robert Fitzgerald & Mark Ellins)
  - F2D winner: (Ukraine) Illia Rediuk
- July 20 – 24: 2016 FAI F1E European Championships for Free Flight Model Aircraft in (Romania) Turda
  - Winner: (Poland) Franciszek Kanczok
  - Teams winner: Poland
- July 22 – 31: 2016 FAI F3 European Championships for Model Helicopters in (Poland) Włocławek
  - F3C winner: (Switzerland) Ennlo Graber
  - F3N winner: (Germany) Eric Weber
  - F3C Teams winners: Switzerland
  - F3N Teams winners: United Kingdom
- July 29 – August 6: 2016 FAI F3A European Championship for Aerobatic Model Aircraft in (Germany) Untermünkheim
  - Winner: (Austria) Gernot Bruckmann
  - Teams winner: Switzerland
- July 30 – August 6: 2016 FAI F3J World Championship for Model Gliders in (Slovenia) Vipava
  - Senior winner: (Croatia) Arijan Hucaljuk
  - Junior winner: (United States) Dillon Graves
  - Senior Teams winner: Germany (Manuel Reinecke, Dominik Prestele, Ryan Höllein)
  - Junior Teams winner: Germany (Max Finke, Jan Christoph Weihe, Felix Parsch)
- August 1 – 7: 2016 FAI F1 Junior World Championships for Free Flight Model Aircraft in (North Macedonia) Prilep
  - F1A winner: (Russia) Mickail Lomov
  - F1B winner: (Ukraine) Dmytro Merzilakov
  - F1P winner: (Poland) Daniel Bogomaz
  - F1A Teams winner: Poland
  - F1B Teams winner: Russia
  - F1P Teams winner: Russia
- August 13 – 20: 2016 FAI F1 European Championships for Free Flight Model Aircraft in (Serbia) Aradac/Zrenjanin
  - F1A winner: (Slovenia) Roland Koglot
  - F1B winner: (Russia) Aleksey Burdov
  - F1C winner: (Russia) Artur Kaitschuk
  - F1A Team winners: France
  - F1B Team winners: Russia
  - F1C Team winners: Poland
- August 13 – 20: 2016 FAI F5 World Championships for Electric Model Aircraft in (Italy) Lugo
  - Winner: (Austria) Johannes Starzinger
  - F5D winner: (Czech Republic) Tomáš Andrlík
  - Team winners: Austria (Johannes Starzinger, Karl Waser, Franz Riegler)
  - Team F5D winners: Czech Republic
- August 20 – 28: 2016 FAI F4 World Championships for Scale Model Aircraft in (Romania) Ploiești
- August 22 – 30: 2016 FAI S World Championships for Space Models in Lviv
  - Winner: (United States) Robert Kreutz
  - Team winners: Ukraine
- October 1 – 8: 2016 FAI F3A Asian-Oceanic Championship for Aerobatic Model Aircraft in (Chinese Taipei) Taichung
  - Winner: (Japan) Onda Tetsuo
  - Junior winner: (Japan) Minemura Shoutaiou
  - Team winners: Japan
- October 2 – 8: 2016 FAI F3 World Championship for Model Gliders in (Denmark) Hanstholm
  - Senior winner: (Croatia) Arijan Hucaljuk
  - Junior winner: (United States) Dillon Graves
  - Seniors Team winners: Germany
  - Juniors Team winners: Germany
