= Carlo Schmid (Swiss pilot) =

Swiss pilot

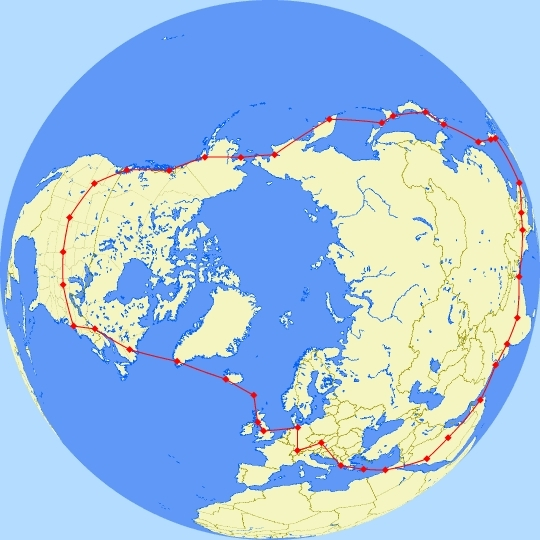
Stops of Carlo Schmid's flight

Carlo Schmid is a Swiss pilot.

In 2012 he became the youngest solo pilot to fly around the world at the age of 22, breaking the previous record held by Barrington Irving. The 110-hour flight of his Cessna 210 lasted 80 days from July 11 to September 29, 2012. The flight concluded with a landing at Dübendorf Air Base, accompanied by the PC-7 Team of the Swiss Air Force.

In 2014, Schmid's record was broken by 19-year-old Matt Guthmiller and in 2022 by 17-year old British-Belgian pilot Mack Rutherford.
