= Segrave Trophy =

British award for achievements in motorsports, aviation and/or powerboating

- Awarded for: "Outstanding Skill, Courage and Initiative on Land, Water or in the Air: the Spirit of Adventure".
- Presented by: Royal Automobile Club
- First award: 1930
- Currently held by: Ben and Tom Birchall (Oct 2024)
- Website: Official website

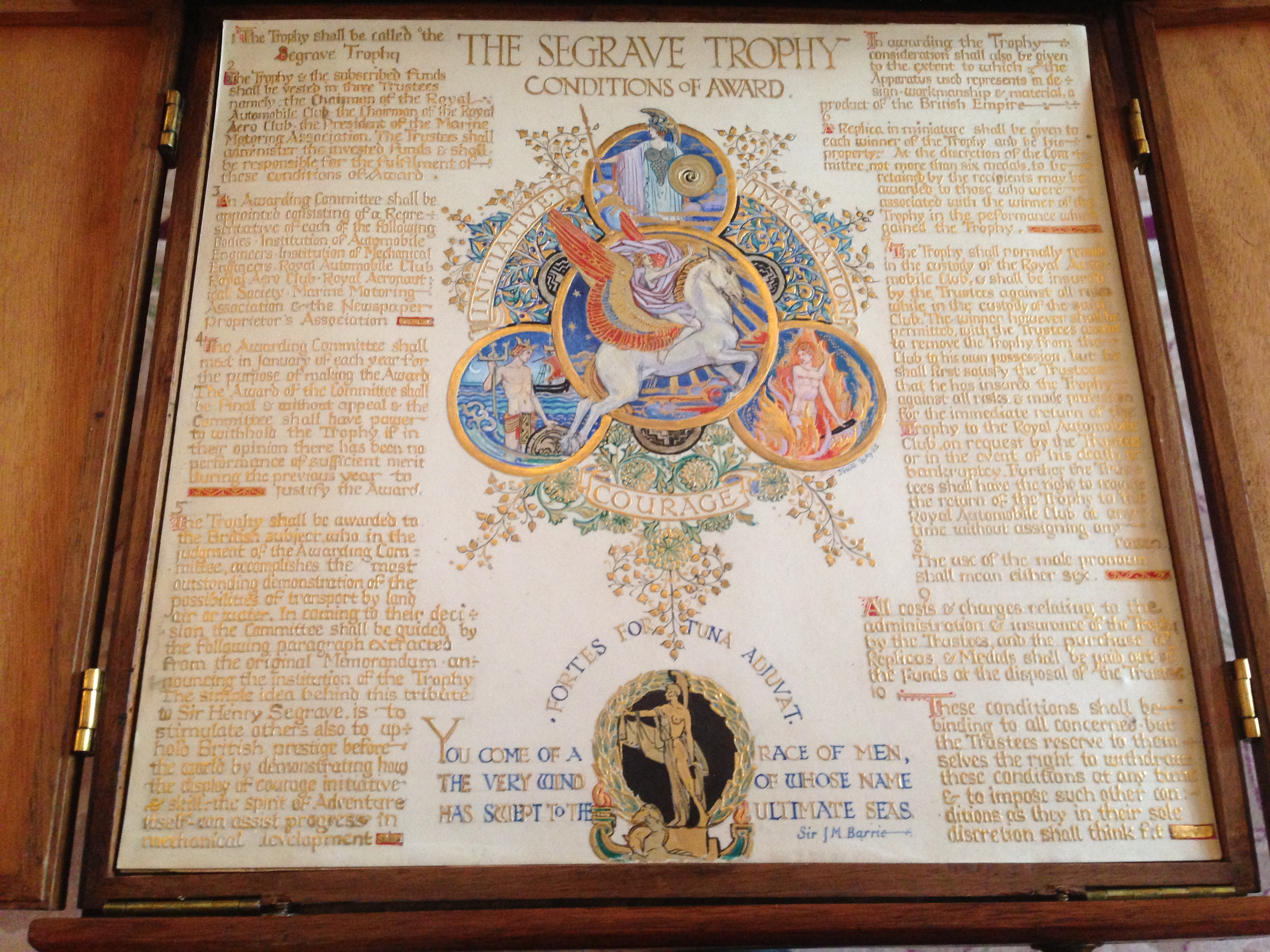
The Segrave Trophy Conditions of Award documentation

The Segrave Trophy is awarded to the British national who demonstrates "Outstanding Skill, Courage and Initiative on Land, Water and in the Air". The trophy is named in honour of Sir Henry Segrave, the first person to hold both the land and water speed records simultaneously. The award was established by Segrave's wife, Lady Doris, who was "determined to carry on his legacy". The trophy, designed by sculptor Gilbert Bayes, is awarded by the Royal Automobile Club. It has been awarded in most years since 1930; it is not presented if, in the opinion of the committee, no achievement has been sufficient to deserve the award. Past sponsors of the trophy include Castrol, Ford Motor Company and Aston Martin.

The inaugural recipient of the Segrave Trophy was Australian-born Charles Kingsford Smith who flew solo from Ireland to Newfoundland, across the Atlantic, in just over 31 hours. He also won the 1930 England to Australia air race, covering the distance solo in 13 days. British aviator Amy Johnson became the first female recipient of the trophy in 1932 when she was cited for her flight from London to Cape Town in a de Havilland Puss Moth. Since then, just five other women have won the award: Jean Batten (1936) for her solo 11-day flight from England to New Zealand, Fiona Gore (1980) for travelling in excess of 100 miles per hour (160 km/h) on water, Eve Jackson (1987) for her solo microlight flight from London to Sydney, Louise Aitken-Walker (1990) for her victory in the short-lived World Rally Championship Ladies Cup and Zara Rutherford (2022) as youngest woman to fly solo around the world. The Segrave Trophy has been presented posthumously on four occasions, to Geoffrey de Havilland Jr. (1946), Donald Campbell (1966), Bruce McLaren (1969) and Joey Dunlop (2000). One of the 2022 winners of the Segrave Trophy was pilot Mack Rutherford, who at the age of 17, is the youngest recipient of the award.

A subsidiary award, the Segrave Medal, may also be given to those individuals who have "played a fundamental role in helping the Segrave Trophy winner to achieve their goal". Peter Du Cane received the medal in 1939 for the design and construction of Blue Bird K4. Bruce McLaren's teammate Denny Hulme and their chief mechanic Cary Taylor won the medal in 1969, their team having won every race of the 1969 Can-Am season. In 1993, the car designer Eric Broadley was presented with the Segrave Medal for his work with Lola Cars. Mark Wilkinson received the medal in 2001 as co-pilot to trophy winner Tim Ellison, and Lady Moss, Stirling Moss's wife, won it in 2005 for her support of her husband. Audi's Wolfgang Ullrich, Tom Kristensen and Loïc Duval received the medal in 2013. Carlin founder Trevor Carlin won the Segrave Medal in 2018 for helping Monger return to motor racing. Additionally, the Segrave Certificate of Achievement may be awarded to a person who is not a British national, but would otherwise qualify for recognition. It has been presented just once, in 2002, to Bjørn Rune Gjelsten who was throttleman for powerboat racer Steve Curtis.

== List of recipients ==
Key
†	Indicates posthumous award
‡	Indicates Segrave Medal was awarded that year
↑	Indicates Segrave Certificate of Achievement was awarded that year

Year	Image	Recipient	Nationality	Citation	Ref(s)
1930	Charles Kingsford Smith	Charles Kingsford Smith	AUS	"For his east-west solo air crossing of the Atlantic from Ireland to Newfoundland in 31½ hours, and victory in 13 days, also solo, in the England to Australia Air Race, in the Southern Cross."	
1931	Bert Hinkler	Bert Hinkler	AUS	"For his solo flight in a de Havilland Puss Moth from Canada to London by the least direct route imaginable."	
1932		Amy Johnson	GBR	"For her record-breaking flight in a de Havilland Puss Moth from London to Cape Town."	
1933	Malcolm Campbell	Malcolm Campbell	GBR	"For raising the Land Speed Record to 272.11 miles per hour (437.92 km/h) in Blue Bird."	
1934	Ken Waller in 1934	Ken Waller	GBR	"For his 4,000-mile (6,400 km) flight from Belgium to what is now the Democratic Republic of the Congo, and back in a de Havilland DH.88 Comet, taking just 3,439 minutes."	
1935	George Eyston	George Eyston	GBR	"For the land speed records over 1 hour, 12 hours and 24 hours, including an average of 140.52 miles per hour (226.15 km/h) over 24 hours of driving in Speed of the Wind."	
1936	Jean Batten in 1937	Jean Batten	NZL	"For her record-breaking solo flight in a Percival Gull from England to Auckland, taking 11 days and 45 minutes."	
1937	A.E. Clouston in 1936	A.E. Clouston	GBR	"For his flight with Betty Kirby-Green in a de Havilland DH.88 Comet from Croydon to Cape Town and back in a flight time of 77 hours and 49 minutes."	
1938	A. T. Goldie Gardner	A. T. Goldie Gardner	GBR	"For attaining the class G land speed record of 186.6 miles per hour (300.3 km/h) in a 1100cc MG Magnette on the German autobahn."	
1939 ‡	Malcolm Campbell	Malcolm Campbell	GBR	"For setting the new water speed record of 141.74 miles per hour (228.11 km/h) at Coniston Water in Blue Bird K4."	
1940	No award due to the Second World War				
1941	No award due to the Second World War				
1942	No award due to the Second World War				
1943	No award due to the Second World War				
1944	No award due to the Second World War				
1945	No award due to the Second World War				
1946	Geoffrey de Havilland	Geoffrey de Havilland Jr. †	GBR	"Awarded posthumously for his contribution to British aviation as a test pilot developing aircraft such as the de Havilland Mosquito, the Hornet and the Vampire."	
1947	John Cobb in 1935	John Cobb	GBR	"For raising the land speed record to 394.19 miles per hour (634.39 km/h) in the Railton Mobil Special."	
1948	John Derry	John Derry	GBR	"For breaking the 100 km closed circuit aeroplane record at Hatfield, Hertfordshire. Flying a de Havilland DH 108 he reached a speed of 605.23 mph (973.8 km/h)."	
1949	No award				
1950	No award				
1951	Geoff Duke in 1951	Geoff Duke	GBR	"For winning the 350cc and 500cc Motorcycle World Championships and both the junior and senior Tourist Trophy races in the same year."	
1952	No award				
1953	Neville Duke	Neville Duke	GBR	"For setting a new air speed record of 727.63 miles per hour (1,171.01 km/h) in a Hawker Hunter over Littlehampton."	
1954	No award				
1955		Donald Campbell	GBR	"For setting a new water speed record of 202.15 miles per hour (325.33 km/h) on Ullswater in Bluebird K7."	
1956	Fairey Delta 2 in which Peter Twiss set a new air speed record	Peter Twiss	GBR	"For setting a new air speed record of 1,132 miles per hour (1,822 km/h) and becoming the first person to break 1,000 miles per hour (1,600 km/h) in level flight, in a Fairey Delta 2 (pictured)."	
1957	Stirling Moss in 1958	Stirling Moss	GBR	"For winning three Grands Prix with Vanwall and breaking five class speed records."	
1958		Donald Campbell	GBR	"For raising the water speed record to 260 miles per hour (420 km/h) on Lake Coniston in Bluebird K7."	
1959	No award				
1960	Short SC 1 aircraft in a museum	Tom Brooke-Smith	GBR	"For attaining vertical flight and hovering stationary in the air in an SC 1 VTOL aircraft (pictured)."	
1961	No award				
1962	Lithograph of Bill Bedford in 1995	Bill Bedford	GBR	"For completing the first vertical landing by a fixed-wing aircraft on an aircraft carrier, landing a Hawker P-1127 on HMS Ark Royal."	
1963	No award				
1964		Donald Campbell	GBR	"For becoming the first person since his father to achieve "the double" of raising the water speed record to 276.33 miles per hour (444.71 km/h) in Bluebird K7 on Lake Dumbleyung, Australia, and taking the land speed record to 429 miles per hour (690 km/h) at Lake Eyre in Bluebird CN7."	
1965	No award				
1966		Donald Campbell †	GBR	"Awarded posthumously for outstanding contribution to mechanical development and aerodynamics."	
1967	No award				
1968	Ken Wallis sitting in Little Nellie	Ken Wallis	GBR	"For his development and airmanship in the field of lightweight autogyro aircraft, and attaining multiple world records."	
1969 ‡	Bruce McLaren in 1966	Bruce McLaren †	NZL	"Awarded posthumously for the design, development and driving of cars that won every round of the 1969 Can-Am Championship."	
1970	Concorde in 1977	Brian Trubshaw	GBR	"For his work in developing and successfully piloting the prototype Concorde supersonic airliner (pictured in 1977), including her first supersonic flight over land."	
1971	No award				
1972	No award				
1973	Jackie Stewart in 1969	Jackie Stewart	GBR	"For winning his third Formula One World Championship in five seasons with a British team, and becoming the most successful Grand Prix driver in history."	
1974	–	John Blashford-Snell	GBR	"For leading the first Zaire River exploration ever to be completed."	
1975	Roger Clark	Roger Clark & Stuart Turner, Jim Porter, Peter Ashworth and Tony Mason	GBR	"For the success of Ford Motor Company in the British Rally Championship."	
1976 ‡	Peter Collins	Peter Collins	GBR	"For winning the World Speedway Championship on a British Weslake engine."	
1977	Barry Sheene	Barry Sheene	GBR	"For retaining the 500cc Motorcycle Grand Prix World Championship."	
1978	John Cunningham	John Cunningham	GBR	"For his 40-year career as chief test pilot at de Havilland and later British Aerospace, including wartime service as a night-fighter pilot, scoring 20 aerial victories in the defence of Britain at the height of the Blitz."	
1979	Mike Hailwood	Mike Hailwood	GBR	"For his long career in motorcycle Grand Prix racing, Formula One and his successes in the Isle of Man TT, including his last, in 1979, at the age of 39, following a successful comeback to the event after an 11-year hiatus."	
1980	–	Fiona Gore	GBR	"For becoming the first woman to achieve more than 100 miles per hour (160 km/h) on water by reaching 102 miles per hour (164 km/h) on Lake Windermere."	
1981	No award				
1982	Sandy Woodward in 2013	Sandy Woodward	GBR	"For his captaincy of flagship HMS Hermes on behalf of all who fought for the liberation of the Falkland Islands."	
1983	Richard Noble	Richard Noble	GBR	"For raising the land speed record to 633.468 miles per hour (1,019.468 km/h) at Black Rock Desert, Nevada, in Thrust 2."	
1984	Barry Sheene	Barry Sheene	GBR	"For his career in motorcycle Grand Prix racing, including being the only man to win World Championship events at all capacities from 50cc to 500cc."	
1985	Ken Wallis sitting in Little Nellie	Ken Wallis	GBR	"For his lifetime of achievement in aviation, including a multitude of world records for altitude, speed and range in autogyro aircraft."	
1986	Richard Branson in 2015	Richard Branson	GBR	"For the development of the Virgin Atlantic Challenger and his effort to break the Blue Riband record crossing of the Atlantic in a sailing boat."	
1987	–	Eve Jackson	GBR	"For her solo flight from London to Sydney in the microlight Shadow."	
1988	Martin Brundle in 2011	Martin Brundle	GBR	"For winning the FIA Sportscar World Championship with Jaguar."	
1989	Bob Ives, Lewis Hamilton, Joe Ives and Stirling Moss in 2008	Bob Ives and Joe Ives	GBR	"For victory in the off-road marathon the Camel Trophy, with its 1,062-mile (1,709 km) route through the Brazilian rainforest from Alta Floresta to Manaus."	
1990	–	Louise Aitken-Walker	GBR	"For winning the Ladies' World Rally Championship title with Vauxhall."	
1991	–	Steve Webster	GBR	"For winning his fourth FIM World Sidecar Championship title."	
1992	Nigel Mansell driving the Williams FW12 in 1988	Frank Williams and Nigel Mansell	GBR	"For victory in the 1992 FIA Formula One World Championship for constructors (Williams) and drivers (Mansell) (pictured in the Williams F1 in Canada in 1988)."	
1993 ‡	Nigel Mansell driving in 1993	Nigel Mansell	GBR	"For winning the CART IndyCar World Championship in America (pictured in the Lola T93/00 at the Mid-Ohio Sports Car Course) at the first attempt."	
1994	Carl Fogarty in 2015	Carl Fogarty	GBR	"For winning the Superbike World Championship with Ducati."	
1995	Colin McRae in 2007	Colin McRae	GBR	"For becoming the first British driver to win the FIA World Rally Championship with Subaru."	
1996	Damon Hill in 1995	Damon Hill	GBR	"For becoming the FIA Formula One world champion and, in so doing, becoming the first son of a former champion to claim the title."	
1997	Thrust SSC	Andy Green	GBR	"For raising the land speed record to 763.065 miles per hour (1,228.034 km/h) at Black Rock, Nevada, in ThrustSSC (pictured) – becoming the first person to break the sound barrier on land."	
1998	Brian Milton	Brian Milton	GBR	"For becoming the first person to circumnavigate the world in a microlight."	
1999	Jackie Stewart in 1969	Jackie Stewart	GBR	"For lifetime services to motor sport."	
2000	Joey Dunlop	Joey Dunlop †	GBR	"Awarded posthumously in recognition of a career of unrivalled achievement in the Isle of Man TT."	
2001 ‡	–	Tim Ellison	GBR	"For the first circumnavigation flight by a disabled pilot."	
2002 ↑	Spirit of Norway driven by Steve Curtis	Steve Curtis	GBR	"For winning as driver in the World, European and Pole Position championships in offshore powerboat racing (Spirit of Norway powerboat pictured)."	
2003	–	Brian Lecomber	GBR	"For his career of more than 20 years as a leading airshow pilot, and journalist and communicator on aerobatics and record breaking."	
2004	No award				
2005 ‡	Stirling Moss in 1958	Stirling Moss	GBR	"For his lifetime of achievement in all forms of motor sport, and his service to the sports."	
2006	No award				
2007	Lewis Hamilton in 2008	Lewis Hamilton	GBR	"For unprecedented achievements in his debut season in the FIA Formula One World Championship."	
2008	Allan McNish	Allan McNish	GBR	"For exceptional endeavour in motor sport."	
2009	Paul Bonhomme	Paul Bonhomme	GBR	"As Britain's first champion in the Red Bull Air Race."	
2010	Adrian Newey in 2011	Adrian Newey	GBR	"For winning Formula One drivers' and constructors' World Championships with three teams: Williams-Renault, McLaren-Mercedes and Red Bull-Renault."	
2011	–	Dave Sykes	GBR	"For being the first paraplegic pilot to fly from York to Sydney in a microlight aircraft, completing the journey in 257 hours."	
2012	John Surtees	John Surtees	GBR	"For his outstanding career in two- and four-wheeled motor sport, including seven Motorcycle World Championship titles, culminating in the unique achievement of being the only man to win both a Motorcycle World Championship and a Formula One World Championship."	
2013 ‡	Allan McNish	Allan McNish	GBR	"First Briton to win the Tourist Trophy, the Le Mans 24 Hours and the FIA World Endurance Championship in the same season."	
2014	No award				
2015	John McGuinness in 2013	John McGuinness	GBR	"For his outstanding contribution to motorcycle road and circuit racing, including setting the outright lap record at the 2015 Isle of Man TT."	
2016	No award				
2017		Sam Sunderland	GBR	"For being the first Briton to win a Dakar Rally crown by winning the motorcycle category in 2017."	
2018 ‡	–	Billy Monger	GBR	"For demonstrating exceptional courage and determination after great adversity and returning to high levels of motorsport."	
2019	No award				
2020 ‡	James Ketchell in 2020	James Ketchell	GBR	"For becoming the first person to perform an around-the-world gyroplane flight certified by the Guinness Book of Records."	
2021		Robin Shute	GBR	"The Royal Automobile Club has presented the 2021 Segrave Trophy to Pikes Peak hero Robin Shute for being the only British Driver to have won Pikes Peak Overall"	
2022		Zara Rutherford and Mack Rutherford	GBR	"The Royal Automobile Club has presented the 2022 Segrave Trophy to youngest solo circumnavigation pilots Zara Rutherford and Mack Rutherford as respectively youngest woman and youngest person to have completed the feat."	
2023		Ben and Tom Birchall	GBR	"Fourteen-times Isle of Man sidecar TT winners Ben and Tom Birchall are the latest and much-deserved winners of the Royal Automobile Club’s Segrave Trophy, awarded for ‘outstanding skill, courage and initiative’."	
2025	Nick Tandy in 2014	Nick Tandy	GBR	"In 2025, Nick Tandy became the first driver to win all four major 24-hour endurance races: Le Mans, Nürburgring, Spa and Daytona."	

At the time of winning, the Australians Kingsford Smith and Hinkler, and New Zealander Batten, were also considered British subjects. New Zealander McLaren's award was after New Zealand's Citizenship Act of 1948 but he was recognised as his McLaren team was British-based.

== See also ==
- List of aviation awards
