= Great Marlow (disambiguation) =

Great Marlow is a civil parish in Buckinghamshire, England.

Great Marlow may also refer to

- Great Marlow, the official name of Marlow, Buckinghamshire, England until 1897
- Great Marlow (UK Parliament constituency)
- Great Marlow School, Marlow, Buckinghamshire
