= Travis Ludlow =

English aviator

- Born: 13 February 2003 (age 22); Ibstone, England
- Education: Great Marlow School
- Known for: Youngest pilot to fly solo around the world
- Website: aroundtheworldsolo.co.uk

Travis Ludlow (born 13 February 2003) is an English aviator. In 2021, he became the youngest person to fly solo around the world at age 18 years old, a record he held for 1 year. (Note: It was subsequently broken 14 months later by British-Belgian pilot Mack Rutherford in 2022.)

== Early life ==
Ludlow was born on 13 February 2003. He is from Ibstone in Buckinghamshire. According to his father Nick, he had aspirations to become a pilot from age 10. His grandfather, an RAF photographer, was his family's only prior connection to aviation. Ludlow also earned a black belt in kickboxing aged 12 and completed a triathlon, using a unicycle, when he was a teenager.

At the age of 14, Ludlow became Britain's youngest glider pilot, having had his first lesson in gliding two years prior. He obtained his private pilot licence at age 16 whilst preparing for his Advanced Level qualifications at Great Marlow School in Buckinghamshire. He became the youngest certified private licensed pilot in the UK at 17.

== Solo flight around the world ==
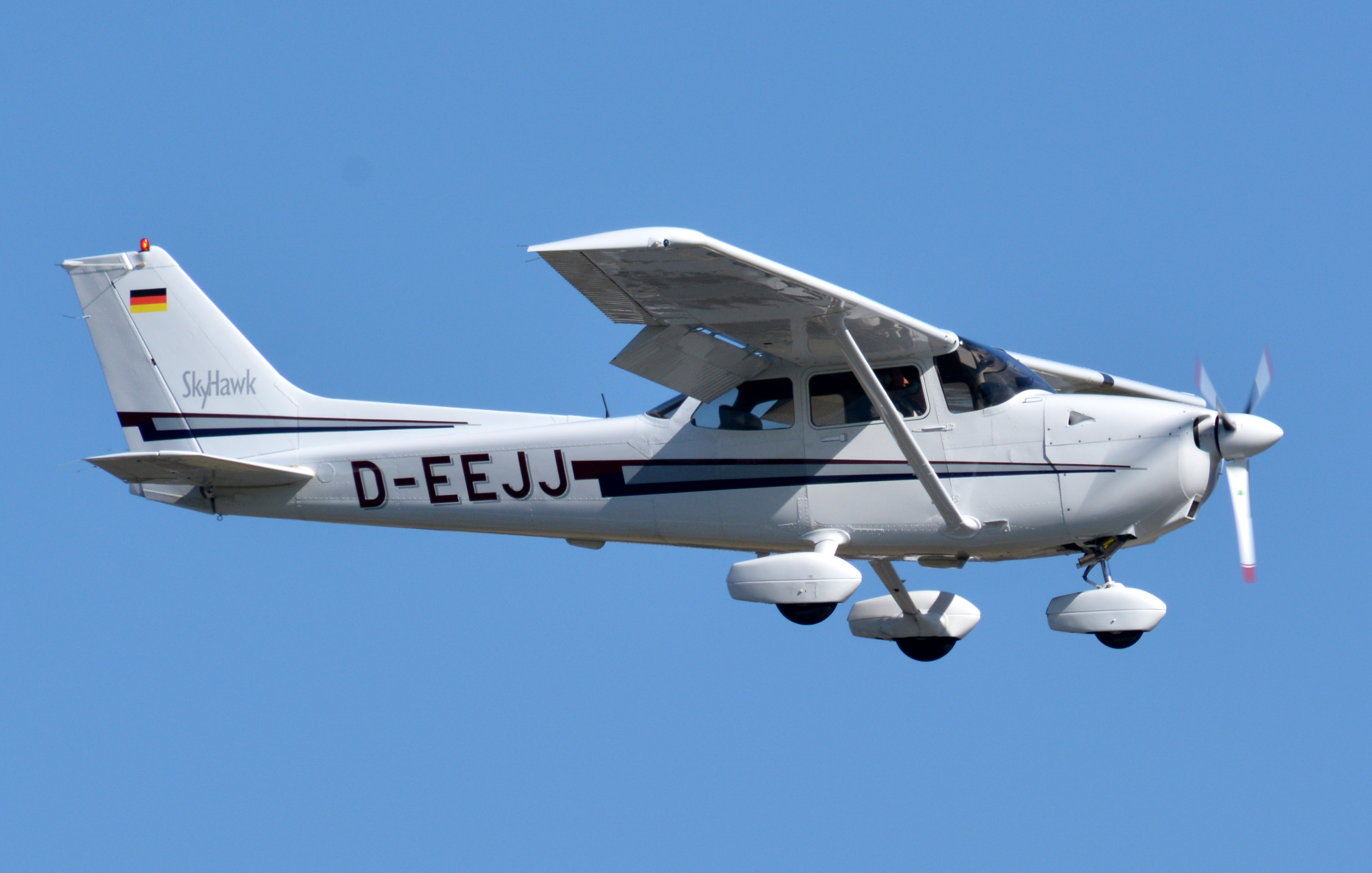
Ludlow flew a Cessna 172R plane.

Ludlow aimed to break the record for the youngest person to fly unaccompanied around the world, which was at the time held by American Mason Andrews. Andrews was 18 years and 163 days old when he finished his journey in October 2018. A Guinness World Records spokesperson said that an official flight log with details of all take-off and landing times, witness statements, and photographic and video confirmation were required in order to break the record. As a result of the coronavirus pandemic, Ludlow could not take off in the first week of June 2020 as he had intended. In addition, his flight route was changed to avoid virus hotspots such as South America in exchange for more stops in the United States to make up for lost distance.

Ludlow departed from Teuge Airport in the Netherlands in a Cessna 172R Diesel on 29 May 2021. His route crossed four continents, 15 countries and 63 stops. The beginning was across northern Europe. In Russia, he flew over Lake Baikal when he flew from Kemerovo to Ulan-Ude. He ran low on fuel near the China–Russia border and had to slow down to 85 miles per hour. A few weeks later he was forced to turn back during a flight in Kamchatka, due to cold weather.

From there Ludlow crossed into Alaska, flew down to California and flew over the Grand Canyon. Over the Rocky Mountains in Montana, Ludlow reported that he had a few problems with the ice and turbulence when a rapid downdraft pulled him towards a mountainside. Ludlow landed in Texas for a couple of days to get his second COVID-19 vaccine and in Monroe, Louisiana, to meet previous record-holder, Mason Andrews. On 1 July 2021, he landed in New York and flew a circle around the Statue of Liberty before flying to Canada where he made stops at Montreal and Saguenay. Due to the scarcity of hotel rooms, he could not stay overnight in Saguenay as he had planned and instead chose to fly to Goose Bay to stay for the night. When Travis flew from County Donegal in Ireland to Gibraltar on 9 July 2021, his trip's total flight distance exceeded that of the Earth's circumference at the Equator. This was the minimum distance needed to achieve the world record. He landed in the Netherlands to complete his circumnavigation, before returning to the United Kingdom to receive his world record certificate. Ludlow also stated that the next world record he was aiming to achieve was for flying around the world in an electric aircraft.

== See also ==
- Matt Guthmiller, formerly the youngest person to fly solo around the world
- Zara Rutherford, youngest female to fly solo around the world
