= OneAircraft One =

Slovenian light-sport aircraft

One

General information
- Type: Light-sport aircraft and certified light aircraft
- National origin: Slovenia
- Manufacturer: OneAircraft; Gogetair Aviation
- Designer: Iztok Šalamon
- Status: In production (2015)

History
- Manufactured: 2013-present

The OneAircraft One is a Slovenian light-sport aircraft (LSA) and certified light aircraft designed by Iztok Šalamon and produced by OneAircraft (One Pro, d.o.o.) of Celje. The aircraft is supplied complete and ready-to-fly.

OneAircraft was founded in 2014 as a joint venture between C2P d.o.o. and Kops pro d.o.o. It was shut down in 2019 and a new company formed to produce the design, Gogetair Aviation.

== Design and development ==
The One was designed to comply with the US LSA rules as a two-seater and the European rules as a certified 3-4 seat EASA CS-VLA category aircraft. It features a cantilever low-wing, an enclosed cabin with two-seats-in-side-by-side configuration or four seats, all accessed by doors, fixed tricycle landing gear and a single engine in tractor configuration.

The aircraft is made from carbon fibre and uses the wings and tail surfaces derived from the Shark.Aero Shark. Its 9.67 m (31.7 ft) span wing mounts flaps. The horizontal stabilizer is low-mounted. The standard engine used is the 100 hp (75 kW) Rotax 912ULS, four-stroke powerplant.

The company has indicated that they expect LSA acceptance in 2017, but as of March 2017, the design does not yet appear on the Federal Aviation Administration's list of approved special light-sport aircraft.

== Variants ==
One LSA
Model with two seats and a 600 kg (1,323 lb) gross weight under development in 2017 for the LSA category
One 2+2
Model under development in 2015 with four seats and a 750 kg (1,653 lb) gross weight under development for the certified CS-VLA category
Certified One
Model under development with three seats and a 750 kg (1,653 lb) gross weight under development for the certified CS-VLA category
Non-Certified One
Factory built experimental model with a 750 kg (1,653 lb) gross weight in production in 2017. The company indicates that they can assist buyers of this model to register it in Slovenia.

== Specifications (One 2+2) ==
Data from Tacke

General characteristics

- Crew: one
- Capacity: three passengers
- Wingspan: 9.67 m (31 ft 9 in)
- Empty weight: 330 kg (728 lb)
- Gross weight: 750 kg (1,653 lb)
- Fuel capacity: 126 litres (28 imp gal; 33 US gal)
- Powerplant: 1 × Rotax 912ULS2 four cylinder, liquid and air-cooled, four stroke aircraft engine, 75 kW (101 hp)
- Propellers: 2-bladed composite

Performance

- Cruise speed: 265 km/h (165 mph, 143 kn)
- Stall speed: 65 km/h (40 mph, 35 kn)
- Rate of climb: 5 m/s (980 ft/min)
