= Shaesta Waiz =

American aviator

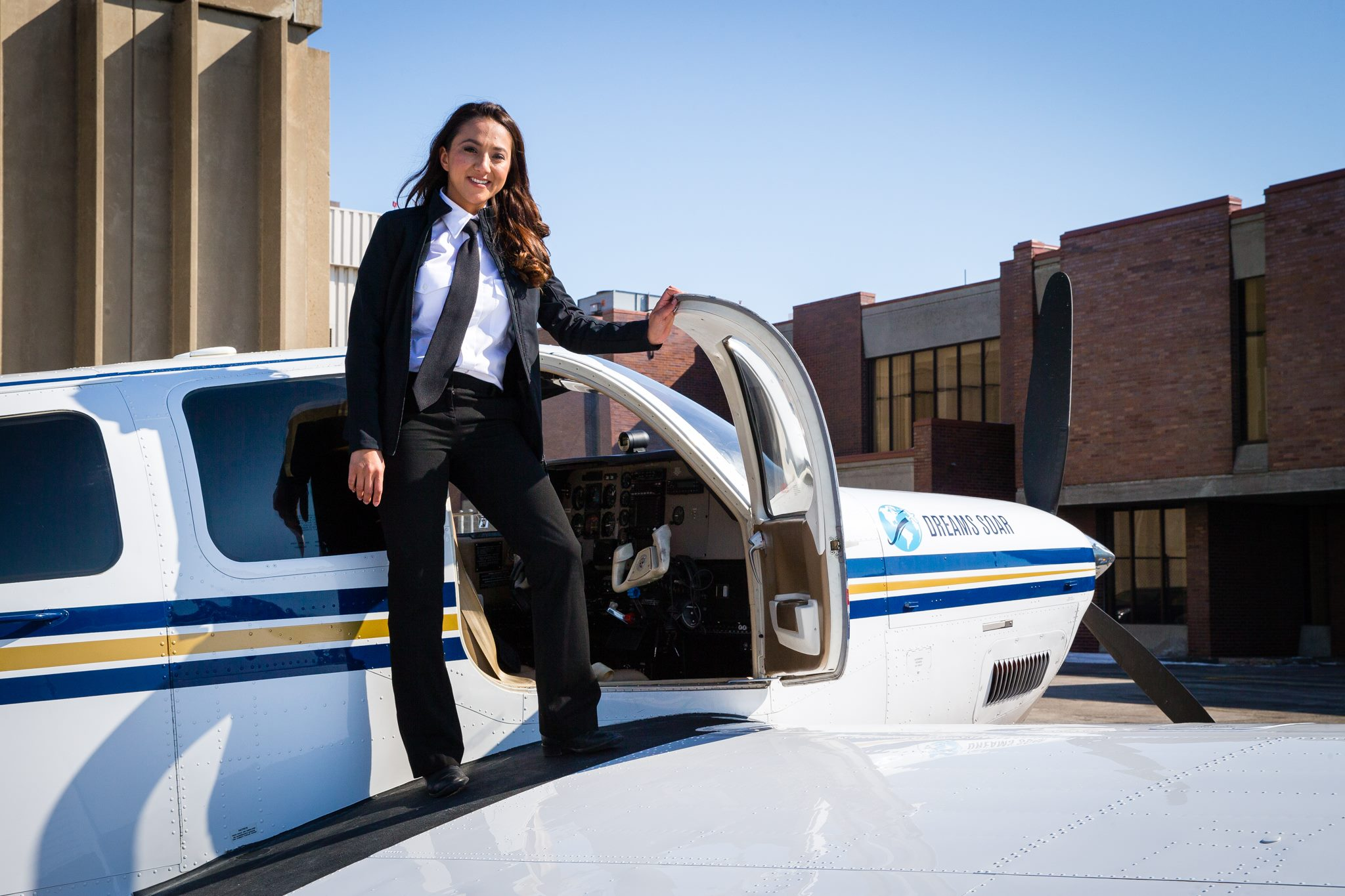
- with the Dreams Soar aircraft, 2016
- Born: 1987; Afghanistan
- Education: Embry–Riddle Aeronautical University
- Known for: Previously held the record for youngest female to make a solo flight around the world in a single-engine aircraft
- Aviation career
- Famous flights: Circumnavigation with a 2001 Beechcraft Bonanza A36 aircraft (12 May 2017–4 October 2017)

Shaesta Waiz (born 1987) is an American aviator. She is the first female certified civilian pilot born in Afghanistan, and in 2017, became the youngest woman to fly solo around the world in a single-engine aircraft - a record she held until Zara Rutherford completed the flight at the age of 19 in January 2022.

Waiz was born in Afghanistan. Her family traveled to the United States in 1987 to escape the Soviet–Afghan War. She went on to study at Embry-Riddle Aeronautical University, where she started the Women's Ambassador Program to mentor and support young women pursuing an education in aviation and engineering.

She founded the non-profit organization Dreams Soar, Inc and planned a solo flight around the world, originally scheduled to launch in 2016. On 4 October 2017, Waiz completed the world solo trip across five continents, with 30 stops in 22 countries in a Beechcraft Bonanza A36.

== Recognition ==
She is the subject of a children's book Fly, Girl, Fly! by Nancy Roe Pimm.

== See also ==
- Amelia Earhart
- Zara Rutherford
- Malala Yousafzai
