= Shark.Aero =

Slovakian aircraft manufacturer

Shark.Aero s.r.o.
- Company type: Spoločnosť s ručením obmedzeným
- Industry: Aerospace
- Founded: 2006
- Headquarters: Senica, Slovakia
- Products: Ultralight aircraft
- Services: aircraft maintenance
- Website: www.shark.aero

Shark.Aero spol. s.r.o. is a Slovak aircraft manufacturer based in Senica. The company specializes in the design and manufacture of ready-to-fly ultralight aircraft. Its sole product is the Shark.Aero Shark, produced in several models since 2006.

== History ==
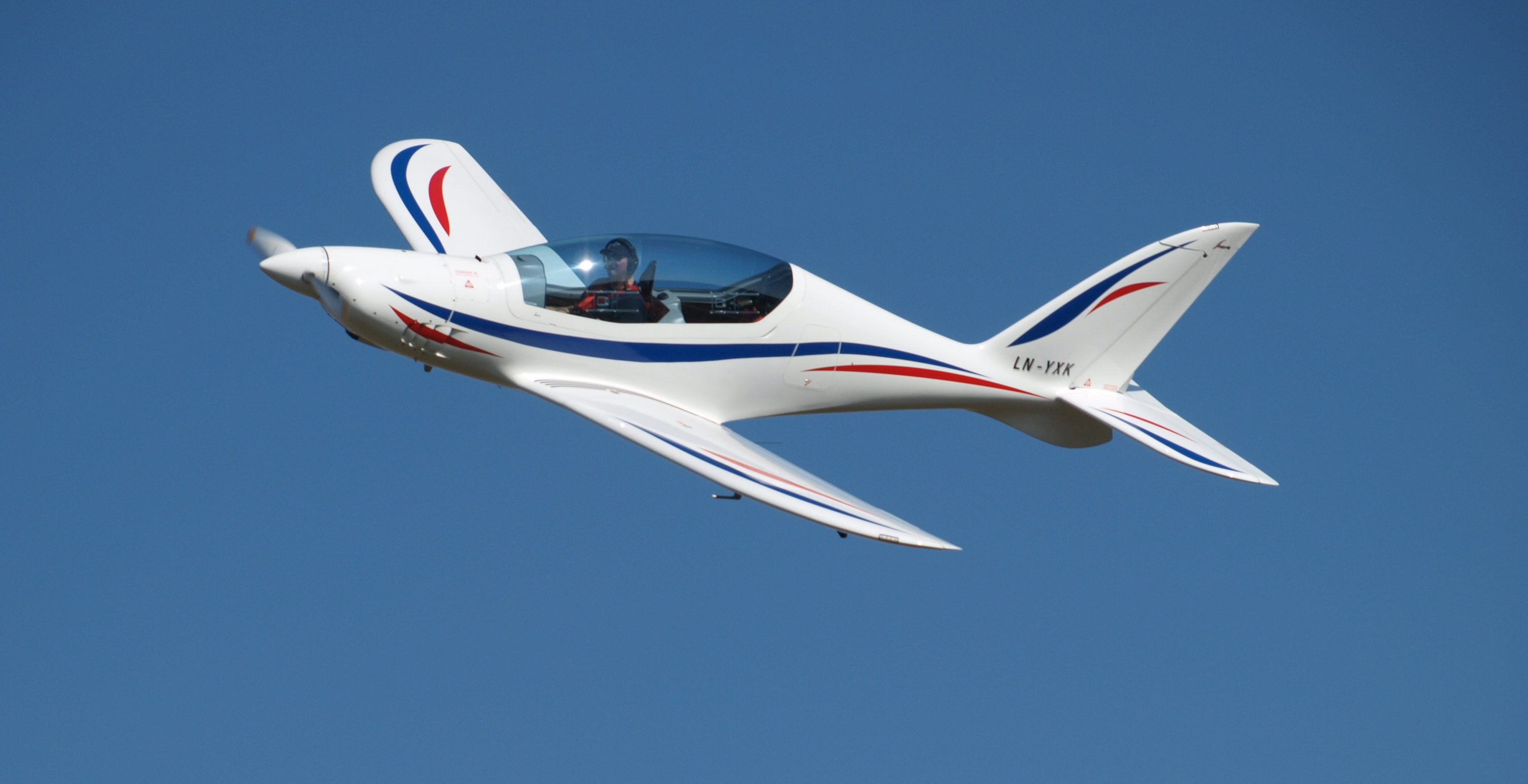
Shark.Aero Shark ULL

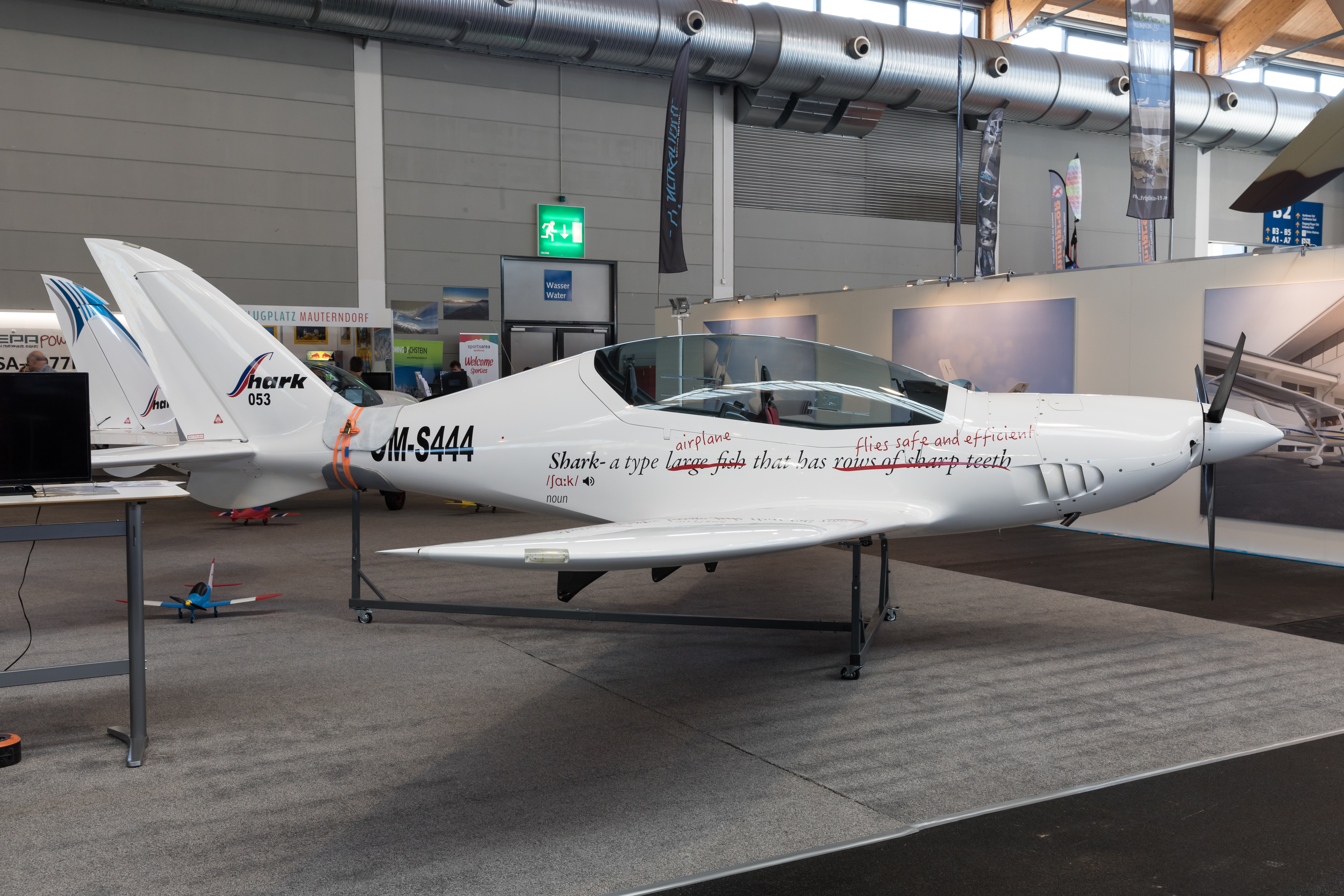
Friedrichshafen aviation expo, 2018

The company was co-founded by designers Vladimír Pekár and Jaroslav Dostál and began operations and design work on the Shark ultralight in 2006.

The company is organized as a spoločnosť s ručením obmedzeným, a Slovak private limited company.

The concept for the Shark aircraft was first announced at the AERO Friedrichshafen aviation expo in Germany in 2007. In 2008, the company completed work on the first prototype of its Shark aircraft and it first flew in 2009.

In 2011, the company delivered the first three Shark aircraft to foreign customers in France and Germany. In 2012, the company completed the sale of six new aircraft to customers. 2013 saw the company receive the Czech Republic's type certificate LAA ČR, as well as the German type certificate Deutscher Aero club e.V. Six to eight Shark planes were built and sold between 2013 and 2015, with plans to increase deliveries up to twelve a year in late 2016.

The Shark aircraft has also received three awards, the Flieger Award 2012, and the Aerokurier 2015 and Aerokurier 2016 awards for "Ultralight of the Future", in two consecutive years.
