= Great Marlow School =

Location
- Bobmore Lane; Marlow, Buckinghamshire, SL7 1JE; England; 51.5802°N 0.7652°W

Information
- Type: Academy
- Motto: Creating Opportunity, Releasing Potential and Achieving Excellence
- Established: 1961
- Specialist: Technology College
- Department for Education URN: 136964 Tables
- Ofsted: Reports
- Headteacher: Guy Pendlebury
- Gender: Co-educational
- Age: 11 to 18
- Enrolment: 1,278
- Houses: Kites; Eagles; Hawks
- Colours: Black, and red (for P.E.)
- Website: http://www.gms.bucks.sch.uk/

Great Marlow School is a co-educational secondary school in Marlow, Buckinghamshire. It takes children from the age of 11 through to the age of 18 and has approximately 1,260 pupils. In August 2011 the school became an Academy. In 2012/2013 the school underwent a building project to erect a new sports hall, all weather astroturf pitches, new bus parking and a community gym complex. The school sold a large plot of land at the top of their field to fund this project.

In September 2005 the school was awarded specialist school status as a technology college, by the Department for Education and Skills (DfES).

Pupils who attend the school normally live in the Marlow or the surrounding villages such as Lane End.

== Sport ==
The School has an active rowing club called the Great Marlow School Boat Club which is affiliated to British Rowing. In 2023 they raced three crews at Henley Royal Regatta, one crew being the first to prequalify for Great Marlow School Boat Club and another getting through a round, the furthest any GMSBC crew has ever made it at Henley Royal Regatta.

== Notable alumni ==
- Elliot Benyon, footballer
- Julian Dutton, comedian
- Andrew Foster, tennis player
- Tyrrell Hatton, professional golfer
- Jason Harrison, cricketer
- Travis Ludlow (born 2003), English aviator
- Steve Redgrave, rower
- Danny Senda, footballer

== The Voice ==
The Voice is a newsletter that is given at the end of every term giving news about the school.
