= Matt Guthmiller =

American aviator, YouTuber, entrepreneur and professional speaker

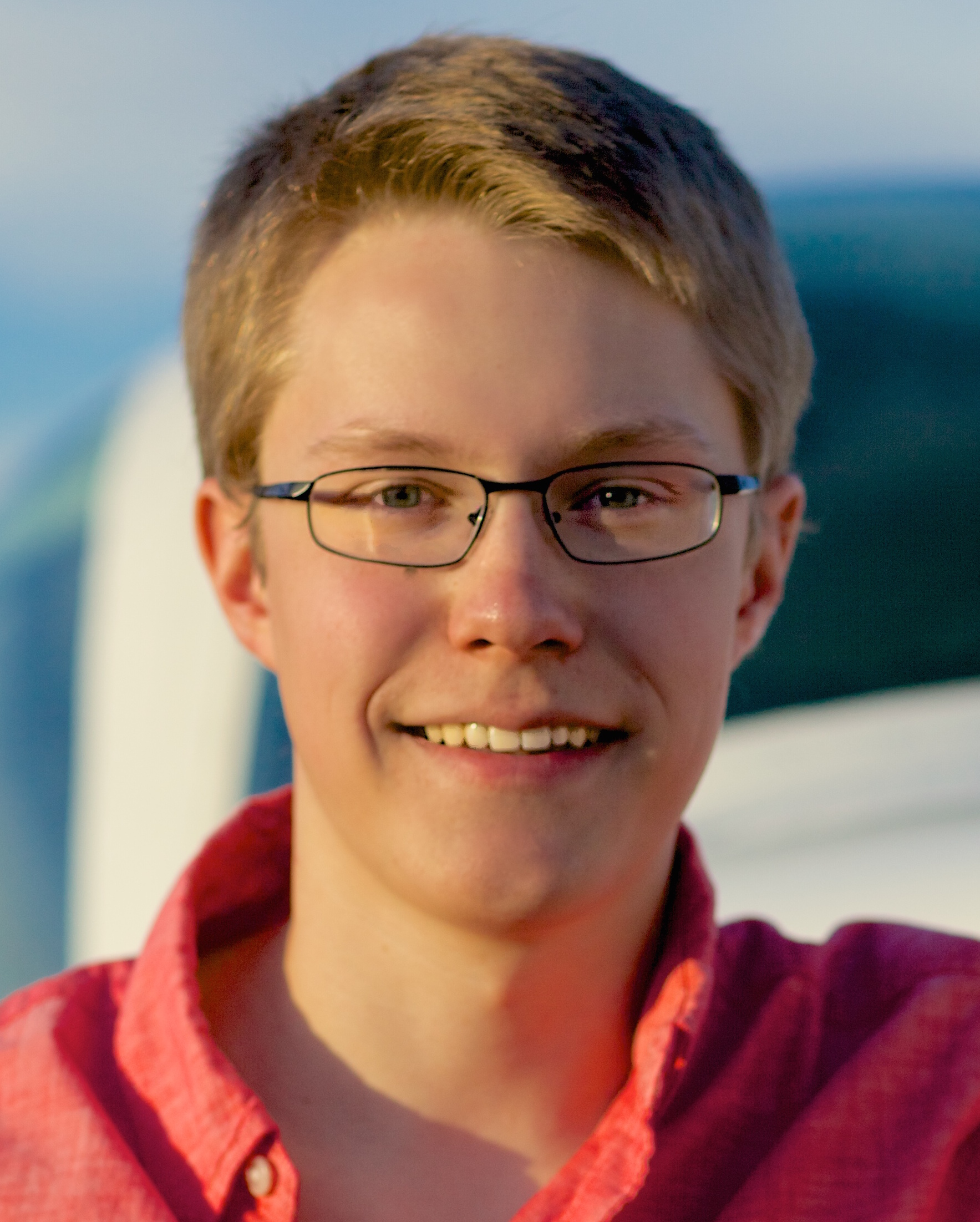
- Guthmiller in 2014
- Born: Matthew Lee Guthmiller; November 29, 1994 (age 31); Aberdeen, South Dakota, U.S.
- Education: Massachusetts Institute of Technology
- Known for: One-time youngest pilot to circumnavigate by aircraft, solo (19 years, 7 months, 15 days)
- Aviation career
- First flight: July 25, 2011; 1975 Cessna 150M
- Famous flights: Global Circumnavigation Flight May 31 – July 14, 2014
- Flight license: November 29, 2011
- Website: www.mattguthmiller.com

Matthew Lee Guthmiller (born November 29, 1994) is an American aviator, YouTuber, entrepreneur, professional speaker, and Massachusetts Institute of Technology alumnus. In 2007, aged 12, he founded an early iPhone unlocking company, AnySIMiPhones. In 2014, at age 19, Guthmiller became the youngest person to fly solo around the world, a record he held for two years. (Note: It was subsequently broken by Australian Lachlan Smart in 2016, American Mason Andrews in 2018, Englishman Travis Ludlow in 2021 and British-Belgian Mack Rutherford in 2022.) In 2019 he became the youngest member of the South Dakota Aviation Hall of Fame, on exhibit at the South Dakota Air and Space Museum.

== Early life ==
Born and raised in Aberdeen, South Dakota, Guthmiller took an interest in aviation from a young age. Growing up he gradually drifted more toward math and science, in particular computer science, which led him to pursue several business ventures.

He started his first company, AnySIMiPhones, at age 12, selling software to unlock the newly released iPhone, which at the time was only available in the U.S. and only on AT&T, so that it could be used with any (GSM) cell carrier worldwide. After being in business for only a few weeks, Guthmiller sold his company to a similar company, FreeIt4Less, and joined their team. Together they unlocked around 20,000 iPhones in dozens of countries.

As the unlocking market dried up after Apple announced the iPhone 3G and its availability in multiple markets in 2008, Guthmiller moved on to pursue his interest in finance. Guthmiller pursued several projects aimed at analyzing financial market data with supercomputers in order to uncover ways to predict the likelihood of future price movements.

== Solo flight around the world ==
After getting bored one weekend in the summer of 2011, Guthmiller realized he could obtain his pilot certificate in a few months when he turned 17. Having wanted to fly his entire life, he convinced his parents to allow him to do a "$20, 20-minute intro flight" at a local flight school. He was instantly hooked. Soloing just a couple weeks later, he earned his private pilot certificate on his 17th birthday before going on to pursue an instrument rating, glider rating, his commercial pilot certificate, and a seaplane rating.

After reading a May 3, 2013, article about 20-year-old Californian Jack Wiegand, who was about to become the youngest person to fly solo around the world, Guthmiller decided he wanted to attempt the same record. After a year of planning, Guthmiller left Gillespie Field in El Cajon, California (San Diego) on May 31, 2014, and 44 days, 12 hours later landed back at Gillespie on July 14, 2014, to become the youngest person to ever circumnavigate the globe by aircraft at 19 years, 7 months, and 15 days old.

During his flight in 2014, Guthmiller spent 180 hours in a small, single-engine 1981 Beechcraft Bonanza, N367HP, and made 23 stops in 15 countries on 5 continents. The longest flight was 16.5 hours from Pago Pago, American Samoa to Hilo, Hawaii. Guthmiller and the plane have since been featured at EAA Airventure Oshkosh and the National Air and Space Museum Udvar-Hazy Center, and he shares his story with audiences around the country in various speaking engagements and in popular aviation media content.
