= Mack Rutherford =

Belgian-British aviator

- Born: June 21, 2005 (age 21)
- Known for: Youngest pilot to fly solo around the world
- Relatives: Zara (sister)
- Website: macksolo.com

Mack Rutherford (born 21 June 2005) is a British-Belgian aviator. On 24 August 2022, under the name Macksolo, he became the youngest person ever to fly solo around the world and the first minor (under eighteen years old) to achieve this feat. He holds four Guinness World Records, including the record for the youngest person to fly solo around the world, previously held by Travis Ludlow, and the record for the youngest person to fly a microlight solo around the world, previously held by his older sister Zara Rutherford. His successful record attempt received significant global exposure, highlighting his mission to demonstrate that young people can make a difference.

== Early life and education ==
Mack Rutherford was born in Belgium and is the son of a Sandhurst-trained British ex-Army helicopter pilot, Sam Rutherford and a Belgian recreational pilot and lawyer Beatrice De Smet. As a young boy, Rutherford would accompany his parents on many flights. At the age of 14, he began training to become a pilot and gained a French ultra light pilot's license in 2020, which at the time, made him the youngest pilot in the world at the age of 15 and 2 weeks.

Besides their parents, Mack and his sister Zara come from a long line of aviators going back five generations. His grandfather and great-grandfather on mother’s side were private pilots and his great-great-grandmother on his father’s side, Margaret Jean Thomas, was amongst the first South-African women to learn to fly. His great-grand uncle, Rae ('Tommy') Thomas, Margaret's son, flew a Catalina during the last World War and died as a war hero, at the age of 23. His story is recounted in the book "The most dangerous moment" by Michael Tomlinson.

Mack grew up in and around airplanes, as his father, organised adventurous flying rallies and expeditions such as the Crete2Cape Vintage Air Rally in 2016.

He studied A-levels at Sherborne school in Dorset and just like his sister, is reading at Stanford University, in Palo Alto, California. He is also a professional ferry pilot and a public speaker signed up with Kruger Cowne.

== Solo flight ==
Rutherford flew a Shark, a high-performance ultralight aircraft which can hit a cruising speed of around 186 mph (300 km/h).

His planned departure in March 2022 and solo flight were significantly complicated by the outbreak of the Ukrainian-Russian war in February 2022. His initial route took him through Kazakhstan and across Russia, but this intended route and permits had to be altered multiple times to adapt to the new geopolitical circumstances.

His longest and most difficult flight lasted 10 hours over the icy waters of the Northern Pacific Ocean, from Kushiro, Japan, to Attu Island, USA, an uninhabited island where he had to land due to unexpected headwinds and the setting sun. He spent the night in an abandoned shed on the runway of this former US Coast Guard station before continuing his journey over the Aleutian Islands to mainland Alaska.

The journey was originally expected to take about 2.5 months, but in the end, it took 5 months and 1 day. He left on the 23 March 2022 from Sofia West, an airfield near the capital of Sofia, Bulgaria, where his, and also his sister's, main sponsor, ICDSoft, is based, and landed back at his starting point on 24 August of that same year.

== Awards ==
On 12 September 2022, the Honourable Company of Air Pilots announced that Mack Rutherford, jointly with his sister Zara Rutherford, also a world record holding pilot, had been awarded the Master's Medal "in recognition of his amazing feat of flying and endurance." Previous recipients, include Sir Richard Branson, Bertrand Piccard, Polly Vacher, André Borschberg, Tim Peake, and James Ketchell, among many others.

On 20 January 2023, Mack was honoured at the annual Awards of the Living Legends of Aviation with the "Barron Hilton Aviation Inspiration Award." The event took place at the International Ballroom of The Beverly Hilton, where the Golden Globes are awarded, and was hosted by pilot and aviation enthusiast John Travolta. He received his award from Living Legend Julie Clark. Other attendees included, among others, aviators and "Living Legends of Aviation" Buzz Aldrin, William Shatner, Shane Lundgren, and Hamish Harding.

In July 2023, the Royal Automobile Club's Segrave Trophy for the year 2022 was awarded to Mack Rutherford and his sister Zara, the youngest person and youngest woman, respectively, to circumnavigate the globe. The Segrave Trophy is awarded to the British national who demonstrates "Outstanding Skill, Courage, and Initiative on Land, Water, and in the Air." The trophy is named in honour of Sir Henry Segrave, the first person to hold both the land and water speed records simultaneously.

== See also ==
- List of circumnavigations
