= Popham Airfield =

Unlicensed airfield in Hampshire, England

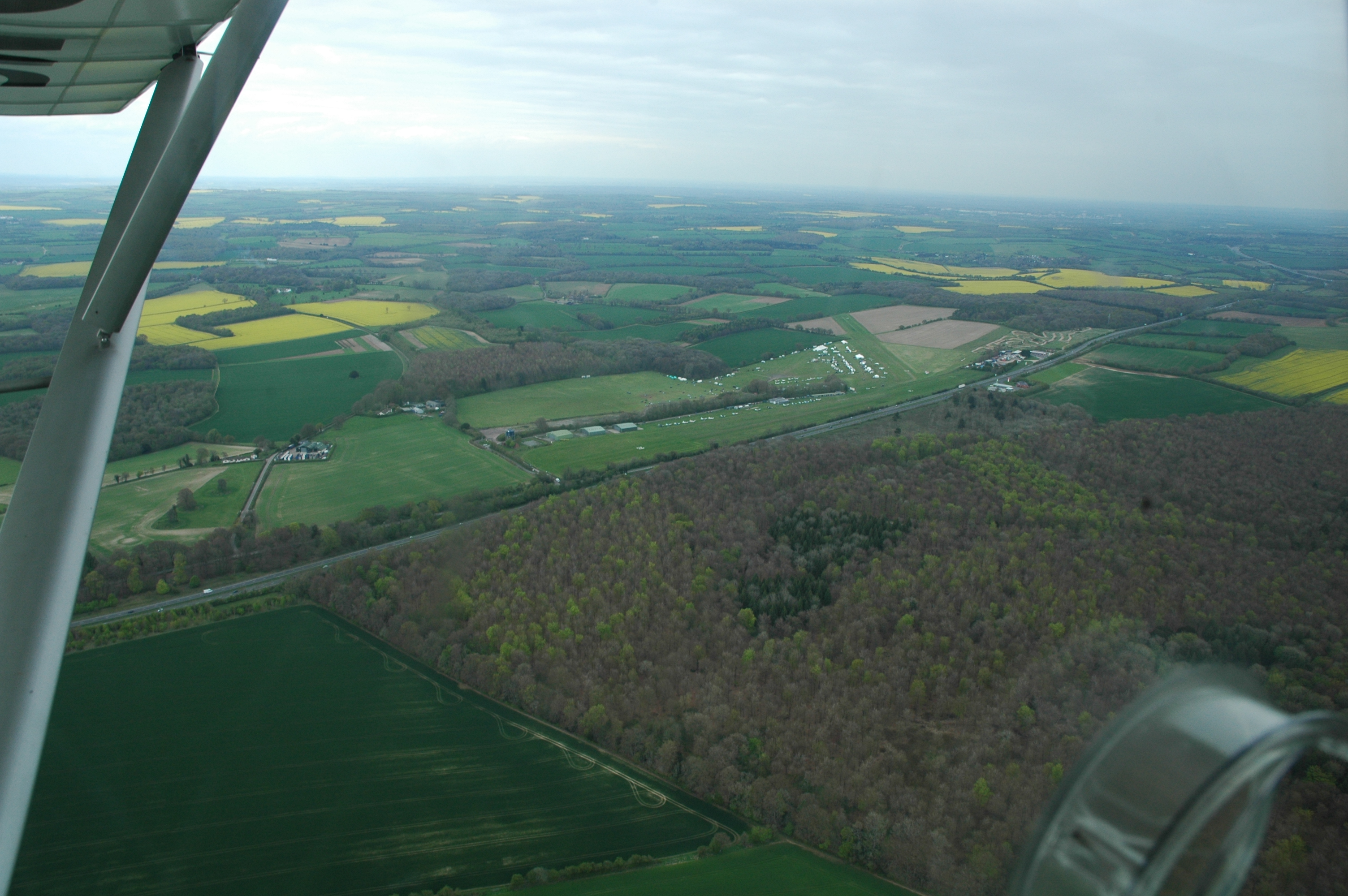
- Aerial view
- IATA: none; ICAO: EGHP

Summary
- Airport type: Public
- Operator: Charles Church (Spitfires) Ltd
- Location: Overton, Hampshire, England
- Elevation AMSL: 550 ft (170 m)
- Coordinates: 51°11′40″N 001°14′10″W

Map
- Location in Hampshire

Runways
| Direction | Length | | Surface |
| Direction | m | ft | Surface |
|---|---|---|---|
| 08/26 | 914 | 3,000 | Grass |
| 03/21 | 900 | 2,953 | Grass |

Popham Airfield (ICAO: EGHP) is an unlicensed airfield located 4 NM (7.4 km; 4.6 mi) south of Overton in Hampshire, England. It lies alongside the A303 road.

The airfield has two grass runways, designated 08/26 and 03/21. Light aircraft maintenance facilities, aircraft hire, and flight training on microlight, light aircraft and gyroplanes is available.

Popham Airfield runs many different events over the year, including the Microlight trade fair in May, the annual Motorcycle Mega Meet & Vintage Aircraft Fly-in in August, and the New Year's Day Fly-in.

Popham Airfield's radio frequency is 129.805 MHz (8.33 kHz spacing) air-to-ground only with an additional operations frequency of 131.405 MHz (8.33 kHz spacing) for the resident flight school. Radio operating hours are from 08:30 until 17:00 (winter 16:30 or sunset if earlier).

The airfield is home to AirBourne Aviation, a flight training school. Microlight training takes place at the airfield using a Comco Ikarus C42 flight simulator.

On 7 April 2007, Second World War fighter ace Neville Duke made an emergency landing in a light aircraft at Popham. He felt unwell and collapsed after landing, and died that evening.
