= James Ketchell =

British adventurer and sportsman

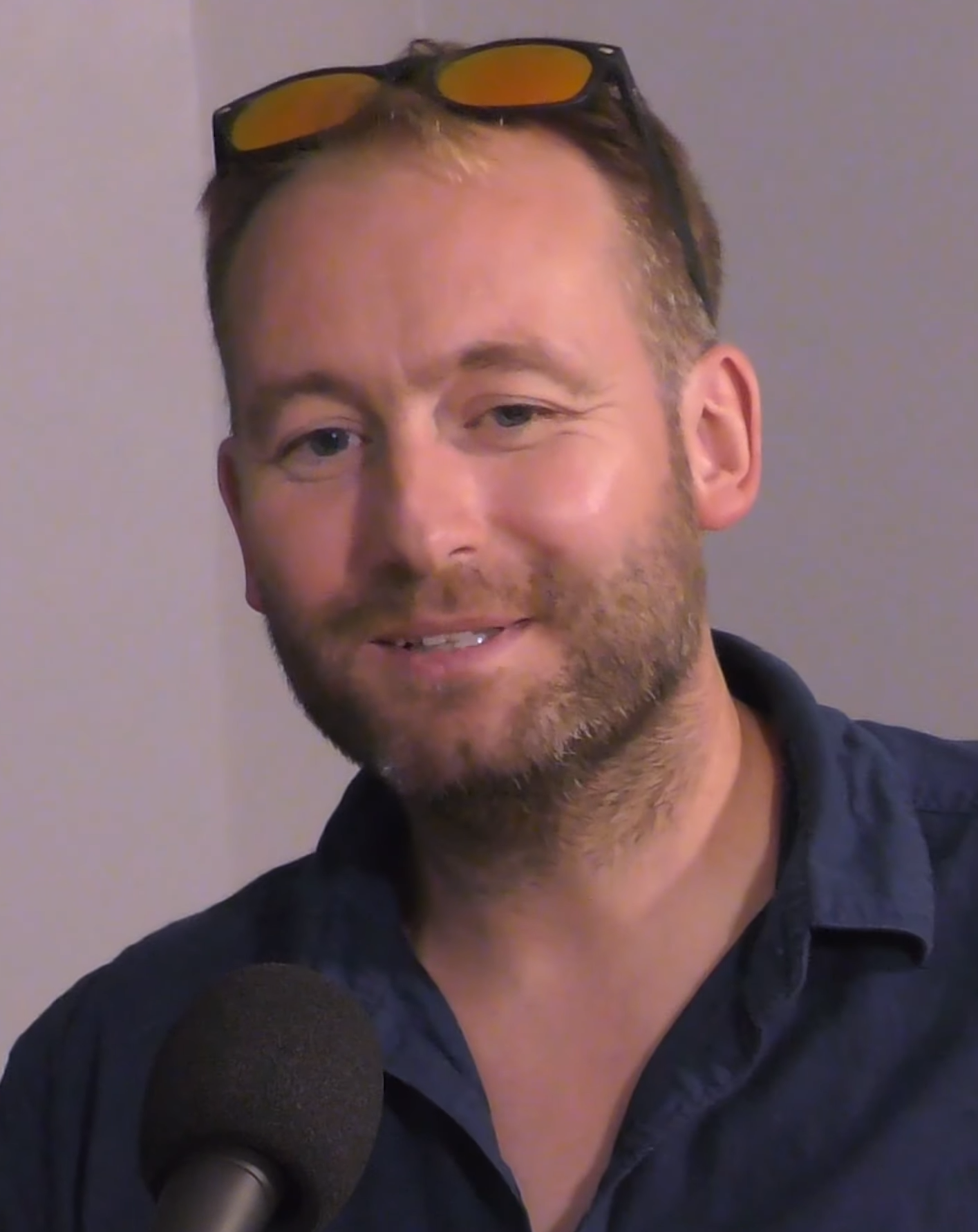
Ketchell in 2020

James Ketchell is a British adventurer. On 1 February 2014, Ketchell became the first person to complete the triathlon of rowing across the Atlantic Ocean, summiting Mount Everest and cycling around the world. On 22 September 2019, Ketchell landed his gyrocopter in Basingstoke, England, becoming the first person to circumnavigate the globe in an autogyro, flying for 175 successive days.

== Circumnavigation of the Globe ==
On 22 September 2019, Ketchell landed his gyrocopter in Basingstoke, England, becoming the first person to circumnavigate the globe in an autogyro, flying for 175 successive days as certified by Guinness World Records and the Fédération Aéronautique Internationale for the fastest eastbound circumnavigation. He flew over Europe, Asia, and North America, making a total of 122 distinct flights in his autogyro. It was also recognised as the fastest eastbound journey in this class. The first physical circumnavigation of the globe by Autogyro, had been completed 3 months earlier by Norman Surplus, but dogged by diplomatic delays it had taken 4 years and 28 days to complete, so was not deemed eligible for setting a first speed record around the world. Both Ketchell and Surplus flew their respective Autogyros, G-KTCH and G-YROX, together during their pioneering Trans - Russia, Bering Straits and Alaskan crossings.

== Global triathlon challenge ==
On 1 February 2014, Ketchell became the first person to complete the triathlon of rowing across the Atlantic Ocean, summiting Mount Everest and cycling around the world.

In 2010, Ketchell rowed single-handed across the Atlantic Ocean in 110 days, four hours and four minutes from La Gomera to Antigua.

On 16 May 2011 Ketchell reached the summit of Mount Everest. Upon his descent he succumbed to pneumonia and spent a week in hospital after arriving back into the UK.

On 30 June 2013 Ketchell departed Greenwich Park and embarked on an 18,000 mile unsupported global cycle, through 20 countries and cycling on average 100 miles a day.

== Indian Ocean 2015 ==
Ketchell attempted to row 3,600 miles across the Indian Ocean from Geraldton to Mauritius in 2015 with fellow Scouting Ambassador, Ashley Wilson. Their aim was to raise awareness of epilepsy among young people as well as supporting other charities (including Young Epilepsy and The Scouts.)

The expedition ended 200 miles off the coast of Western Australia when Ketchell’s rowing partner sustained a serious head injury during a storm and needed to be rescued. A 100,000 ton crude oil tanker called the Dubai Charm came to their rescue.
