= Abby =

- Pronunciation: /ˈæbi/
- Gender: Unisex
- Language: English

Origin
- Languages: English, Hebrew, Germanic
- Origin: Historically a nickname for Abigail or Albert
- Meaning: "My father is joyful" (Hebrew) "Noble" and "Bright" (Germanic)
- Region of origin: English-speaking world

Other names
- Related names: Abbey, Abbi, Abbie, Abigail, Albert, Aby, Abey, Abi, Abie, Gobnait (Irish), Abaigeal (Irish), Ailbhe (Irish)

Abby is a given name, most often a shortened form of Abigail or Albert.

== Notable women ==
- Abby Binay (born 1975), Filipino politician
- Abby Choi (1995–2023), Hongkonger celebrity and murder victim
- Abby Cook (ice hockey) (born 1998), Canadian ice hockey player
- Abby Dalton (1932–2020), American actress
- Abby Ellin, American author and journalist
- Abby Elliott (born 1987), American actress and comedian
- Abby Ellis, American documentary filmmaker, journalist, editor, and cinematographer
- Abby Erceg (born 1989), New Zealand footballer
- Abby Ershow, American nutritionist
- Abby Ryder Fortson (born 2008), American actress
- Abby Franquemont (born 1972), American textile crafts writer and lecturer
- Abby and Brittany Hensel (born 1990), American conjoined twins
- Abby Hoffman (born 1947), Canadian former middle-distance runner
- Abby Hustler (born 2003), Canadian ice hockey player
- Abby Johnson (activist) (born 1980), American anti-abortion activist
- Abby Kasonik (born 1975), American painter
- Abby Kelley (1811–1887), American abolitionist and radical social reformer
- Abby Fisher Leavitt (1836–1897), American social reformer
- Abby Leigh, American painter
- Abby Martin (born 1984), American journalist
- Abby Rockefeller Mauzé (1903–1976), American philanthropist, first child of Abby Rockefeller and John D. Rockefeller Jr.
- Abby Meyers (born 1999), American basketball player
- Abby Newhook (born 2003), Canadian ice hockey player
- Abby Phillip (born 1988, American journalist
- Abby Ringquist (born 1989), American ski jumper
- Abby Roque (born 1997), American ice hockey player
- Abby Aldrich Rockefeller (1874–1948), American socialite and philanthropist, wife of John D. Rockefeller Jr.
- Abby Rockefeller (ecologist) (born 1943), American ecologist and feminist
- Abby Sage, Canadian musician
- Abby Stein (born 1991), American transgender activist and writer
- Abby Steiner (born 1999), American sprinter
- Abby Sunderland (born 1993), American sailor who attempted to become the youngest person to circumnavigate the world
- Abby Taylor (born 1985), Tobago politician
- Abby Travis (born 1969), American musician
- Abby Trott, American voice actress
- Abby Varrica, American voice actress and comedian
- Abby Wambach (born 1980), American retired soccer player and co
- Abby Waner (born 1986), American basketball player
- Abby Winterberger (born 2010), American freestyle skier
- Abby Moon Zeciroski (born 1973), American mixed media artist

== Notable men ==
- Abby Altson (1866–1948), British artist
- Abby Berlin (1907–1965), American film and TV director
- Abby Jan Dharamsey, British politician
- Abby Mann (1927–2008), American film writer and producer
- Abby Mukiibi Nkaaga, Ugandan actor
- Abby Singer (1917–2014), American production manager and assistant director
- Abby V, Canadian singer and songwriter

== Fictional characters ==
- Abby (Doctor Who), in audio dramas based on the TV series Doctor Who
- Abby Anderson, character in the 2020 video game, The Last of Us Part II
- Abby, the cow in the animated series Back at the Barnyard
- Abby Cadabby, on the television show Sesame Street
- Abby Davies, on the soap opera Hollyoaks
- Abby Day, Jessica's sister on New Girl
- Abby Deveraux, on the American soap opera Days of our Lives
- Abby Hatcher, main protagonist of the eponymous 2018 animated children's program produced by Guru Studio
- Abby Holland, a comic book character who exists in the DC Universe
- Abby Littman, a character in the Netflix drama series Ginny & Georgia
- Abby Lockhart, a medical doctor on the television series ER
- Abby Maitland, on the ITV science-fiction drama Primeval
- Abby Mallard, a character in Chicken Little
- Abby Martin, antagonist of season 2 in K.C. Undercover
- Abby Newman, on the American soap opera The Young and the Restless
- Abby Park, in the Pixar film Turning Red
- Abby Sciuto, a forensic scientist on the television series NCIS
- Abby Stevenson, a main character in the book series The Baby-Sitters Club
- Abby Bennett Wilson, in The Vampire Diaries
