= Jessica Watson =

Australian sailor (born 1993)

Jessica Watson OAM
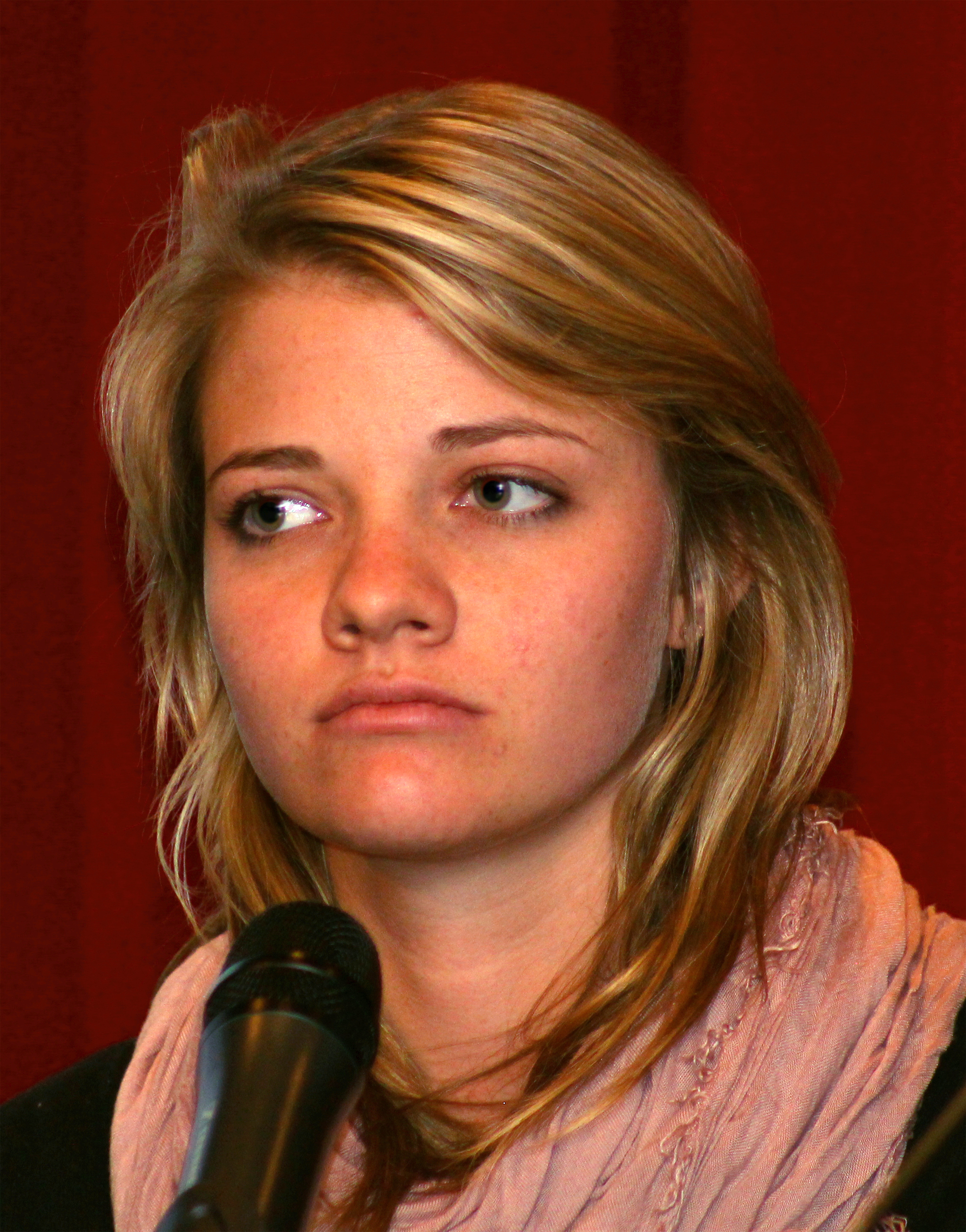
- Watson in Düsseldorf, Germany, in 2011
- Born: Jessica Rose Watson; 18 May 1993 (age 33); Gold Coast, Queensland, Australia
- Citizenship: Australia; New Zealand
- Occupation: Sailor
- Partner: Cameron Dale (2011–2021)
- Awards: Australian Sailing Hall of Fame; Medal of the Order of Australia
- Website: jessicawatson.com.au

Jessica Rose Watson (born 18 May 1993) is an Australian sailor who attempted a solo circumnavigation at the age of 16 from 18 October 2009 to 15 May 2010. Although she circled the planet, she did it in a narrow range of latitudes relatively far from the equator that resulted in her voyage falling short of the distance criterion of 21,600 nautical miles (40,000 km) for a circumnavigation – the equivalent of the circumference of the Earth at the equator – by nearly 2,000 nautical miles (3,700 km); Watson was nevertheless named 2011 Young Australian of the Year and awarded the Medal of the Order of Australia in 2012 for "...service to sailing and to youth through the achievement of sailing solo and unassisted around the world [sic], and as a role model for young Australians".

== Early life ==
Jessica Rose Watson was born on the Gold Coast, Queensland. The second of four children of New Zealand–born couple Roger and Julie Watson, who moved to Australia in 1987, she has dual Australian and New Zealand citizenship. She has an older sister (Emily) and younger brother and sister (Tom and Hannah). All four took sailing lessons as children, and the family went on to live on board a 16-metre cabin cruiser for five years, the children being home schooled via distance learning. Later they lived on a purpose-built double-decker bus for some time. When Watson was eleven and they were still living on the boat, her mother read Jesse Martin's book Lionheart: A Journey of the Human Spirit to the children as a bedtime story. This led to Watson forming the ambition, at age 12, to sail around the world too. She started sailing when she was 14 years old.

== Voyage and publicity ==
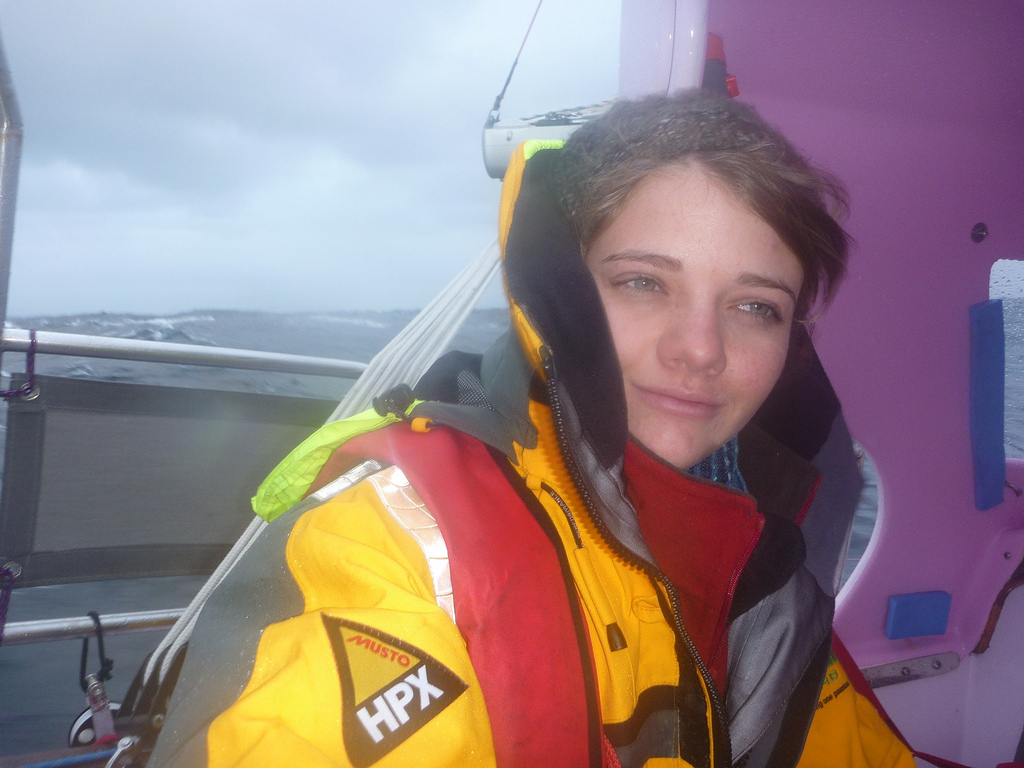
Watson sailing Cape Horn, 13 January 2010

Approximate route taken by Watson on her voyage between October 2009 and May 2010

In planning her trip, Watson conferred with an official of the World Sailing Speed Record Council for the criteria for a global circumnavigation: "a vessel must start from and return to the same point, must cross all meridians of longitude and must cross the Equator.... The shortest orthodromic track of the vessel must be at least 21,600 nautical miles".

Officially announced in May 2009, the journey was expected to take eight months with an estimated sailing distance of 23,000 nautical miles (43,000 km). To fulfill the plan of sailing non-stop and unassisted, during the journey no other person would be allowed to give her anything and she must not moor to any port or other boat, although advice over radio communication would be permitted.

Watson's planned circumnavigation route was to start and end at Sydney and to pass near New Zealand, Fiji, Kiribati, Cape Horn, Cape of Good Hope, Cape Leeuwin and South East Cape. According to the circumnavigation criteria set by the International Sailing Federation's WSSRC, one of the necessary (though not, of itself, sufficient) conditions is crossing the equator. Such a crossing was carried out near Kiritimati, though it is not clear whether the planned voyage took the WSSRC's orthodromic distance criteria into consideration. Watson arrived back in Sydney Harbour at 1:53 pm, Saturday 15 May 2010.

The Los Angeles Times reported Watson's reason for her journey: "I wanted to challenge myself and achieve something to be proud of. And yes, I wanted to inspire people. I hated being judged by my appearance and other people's expectations of what a 'little girl' was capable of. It's no longer just my dream or voyage. Every milestone out here isn't just my achievement, but an achievement for everyone who has put so much time and effort into helping getting me here."

Watson wrote a book about her experience, True Spirit, published by Hachette Australia. The book was released on 29 July 2010.

Watson filmed a documentary about her solo trip before, during and after completing her journey. It was narrated by Sir Richard Branson and premiered on One HD on 16 August 2010, before being released on DVD along with a CD album on 20 August 2010.

== Preparation ==
As training, Watson crewed on a number of vessels, including OceansWatch's Magic Roundabout on which she acted as skipper during a crossing of the Tasman Sea. At the time she left on her voyage, Watson had the following qualifications:

- RYA/ISAF Offshore Safety course (ISAF SR 6.01) Cat zero (one-day 8-hour course)
- RYA Diesel Engine course (one-day 8-hour course)
- RYA Radar course (one-day 8-hour course)
- YAs Safety and Sea Survival certificate (two-day 16-hour course)
- OMTC-issued Certificates of Competence for Apply First Aid HTLF301B
- IMO-compliant Elementary First Aid Table A VI/1-3 STCW95 (one-day 8-hour course)
- Yachtmaster Ocean theory certificates (40-hour course)
- Radio operator's licence
- About 6,000 coastal and 6,000 ocean miles experience.

=== Boat ===
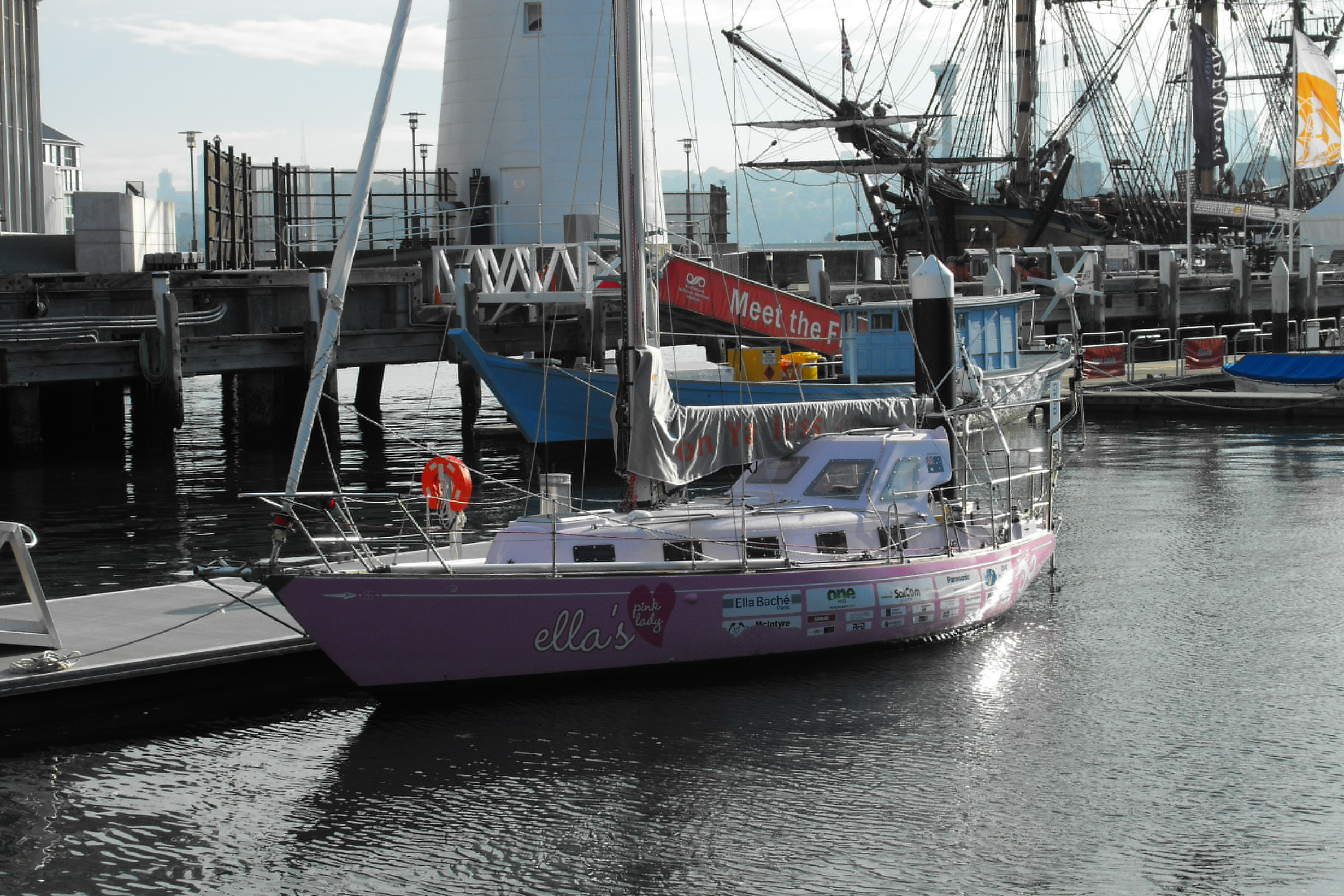
- Ella's Pink Lady at the Australian National Maritime Museum, following the completion of her voyage

History

Australia
- Name: Ella's Pink Lady
- Namesake: Ella Baché
- Owner: Jessica Watson
- Route: Sydney – Kiritimati – Cape Horn – Cape of Good Hope – Cape Leeuwin – Sydney
- Launched: 1984
- Renamed: Original name Shanty

General characteristics
- Type: S&S 34 yacht
- Length: 34 ft (10 m)
- Beam: 10.1 ft (3.1 m)
- Draught: 6 ft (1.8 m)
- Propulsion: Sails
- Crew: 1

The boat is a 10.23-metre (33.6 ft) Sparkman & Stephens model S&S 34, the same design as used by Jon Sanders, David Dicks and Jesse Martin in their circumnavigations. It was obtained and refitted with new equipment under the supervision of Don McIntyre and Bruce Arms, both skilled and experienced sailors. The refitting included a new galley, reconditioned diesel and water tanks, and a complete rebuild of the electrical system. Watson was also deeply involved in the preparation of the boat, which she named Ella's Pink Lady. Most of the time the boat is steered by a self-steering windvane system. She has named the system Parker after the chauffeur of the pink Rolls-Royce in the Thunderbirds television series.

=== Test run and collision ===
During a test run sailing from Brisbane to Sydney, on her first night after leaving Brisbane, Ella's Pink Lady collided with the Silver Yang, a 63,000-tonne bulk carrier at about 02:00 am on 9 September 2009 near Point Lookout. Watson's boat was dismasted in the collision. She was able to retain control and return the boat to Southport under motor.

The Australian Transport Safety Bureau's preliminary report on the collision found that Watson had been taking a five-minute nap during the event (thus she was asleep at the time of the collision), and that while she had checked her radar prior to lying down, she had failed to spot the Silver Yang. This led to the accident four minutes later. The report also found that the Silver Yang had been aware of her presence and had attempted to change course, but that this had been insufficient to avoid Watson's boat.

The final report was released in June 2010. The report stated that both Watson and the Silver Yang's watchkeepers had failed to maintain an adequate lookout and that both had failed to properly employ the navigational aids. In addition, the report found that the watchkeeper on the Silver Yang had failed to offer assistance to Watson after the two vessels had collided.

== Journey ==
Watson sailed out of Sydney Harbour on 18 October 2009 in her pink-hulled Ella Baché–sponsored Ella's Pink Lady. Eighteen days later, on 5 November, she passed Tonga, sailing clear of both New Zealand and Fiji.

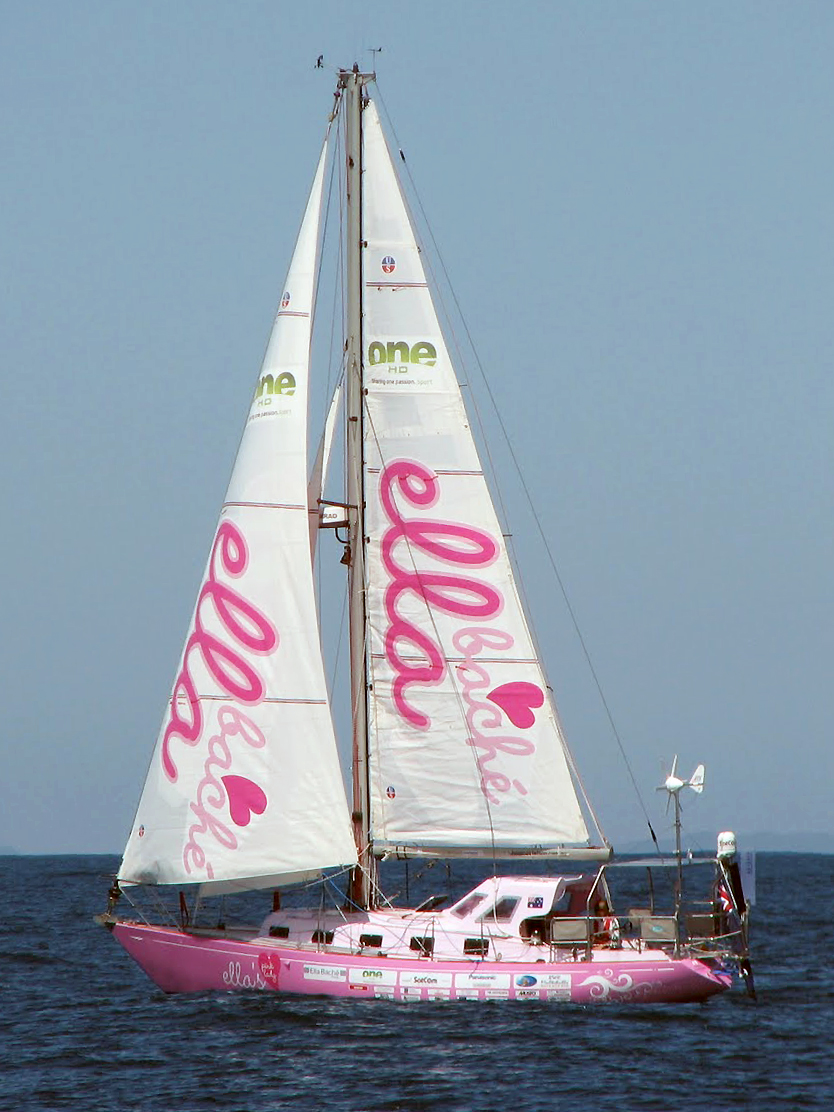
Ella's Pink Lady leaving Brisbane for Sydney

As required for a full circumnavigation, she crossed the equator on 19 November 2009 (Australian date), near Jarvis Island at about 161°40'W longitude, and rounded Kiritimati on 22 November 2009 (Australian date) after 36 days. Then she crossed the equator again at 156°20'W longitude, and continued south-easterly towards Cape Horn. The sailed distance from Sydney to Kiritimati was about 3,900 nmi. At Christmas she was near Point Nemo, the place located furthest from land.

On 13 January 2010 (9:40 UTC) she passed Cape Horn, having sailed around 9,800 nmi in 87 days. This was 11 days ahead of the planned 100 nmi (190 km) per day schedule. Soon after her parents flew over her in a small plane in order to witness the passage. Just over a week later, on 23 January 2010, several days after passing the Falkland Islands, she suffered four knock-downs in a severe storm with 10-metre waves and 70-knot (130 km/h) winds. The storm caused minor damage to her boat and her emergency beacon was inadvertently activated as the mast hit the water.

The halfway point on the voyage was passed on 25 January 2010, her 100th day at sea, 11,500 nmi (21,300 km) based on the original calculation of 23,000 nmi (43,000 km) sailing route.

On 15 February 2010, she crossed the Prime Meridian, crossing from the Western Hemisphere to the Eastern Hemisphere. This placed her near the Cape of Good Hope, which she passed on 24 February, reaching Cape Agulhas (the southernmost point of Africa), and crossing from the Atlantic Ocean into the Indian Ocean. From southern Africa, Watson sailed more than 5,000 nmi (9,300 km) towards Western Australia.

Watson arrived in the Australian economic zone on 10 April 2010, celebrating with crackers and Vegemite. There her parents and media flew over her in a small plane in order to welcome her. She passed Cape Leeuwin on south-western Australia two days later, with approximately 2,500 nmi (4,600 km) remaining.

When south of Australia, Watson suffered a lot of bad weather. In this part of the journey, she had at least three knockdowns (where the mast hit the water), one of them with the mast deep into the sea, but escaped serious damage and injury. The swells she experienced in the Great Australian Bight were up to 12 metres in height, higher than at any time before.

On 3 May, Watson rounded the South East Cape of Tasmania and began heading north to Sydney, her final destination. She completed her journey on day 210 of her voyage at 1:53 pm on 15 May 2010 when she arrived in Sydney Harbour. Her 17th birthday was three days later.

During the journey Watson had to repair the boat and the equipment. Several of the repairs were reported on the blog: the battery monitor (18 December), the stove, toilet and mainsail (24 January), the toilet again (11 March), replacement of wind generator blades (30 March), the kettle (10 April), the mainsail again (18 April), replacement of the wind generator with a spare (21 April), and finally the fuel pump of the engine (10 May).

=== Ella's Pink Lady stays in Queensland ===
In the months following the completion of Watson's journey, there were questions about what would become of her boat, Ella's Pink Lady. In April 2011, after the state and federal governments jointly purchased the yacht for $300,000, it was announced that the Pink Lady would have a permanent exhibition at the Queensland Maritime Museum in Brisbane.

== Criticism ==
Watson's journey has been criticised, particularly after the collision with the freighter. Barry Tyler of Pacific Motor Yacht magazine wrote, "like the majority of the seafaring world [I] consider it irresponsible, cavalier and indeed ignorant to attempt such a feat, at such a tender age and with so little trans-ocean experience." Questions about her experience were also expressed by Phil Jones, the CEO of Yachting Australia, and by Grant Wharington, the skipper of Skandia, with Wharington stating that he had been impressed by Watson when they had met, but that he had advised her to gain experience by undertaking a number of shorter solo passages before attempting the circumnavigation, although she chose not to follow his advice. A more general concern was raised by the Australian Childhood Foundation, who questioned whether a 16-year-old would have the ability to fully understand the risks that such a venture would involve.

=== Circumnavigation scrutiny ===
Sailing website Sail-World.com published an analysis on 3 May 2010 which claimed that the expected rhumb line distance travelled by Watson was 19,631.6 nmi (36,357.7 km), which was less than the required distance according to the definition set by the World Sailing Speed Record Council (WSSRC), and that the journey was therefore ineligible to claim world record status for round-the-world journeys. The equivalent orthodromic distance for Watson's route would be 18,582 nmi (34,414 km). The WSSRC definition states in part "The shortest orthodromic track of the vessel must be at least 21,600 nmi (40,000 km) in length." The analysis suggests that Watson's published distance logs are based on sailed distances, including tacks and strategic weather detours, rather than the shortest orthodromic track between islands and capes as defined. The rule is based on the older rule, followed by current record-holder Jesse Martin, that during a circumnavigation the sailor must pass two points on opposite sides of the Earth (antipodes). For example, if starting in southern England, a place near the start will be opposite to the track near New Zealand. It was replaced by the rule that for world records the shortest orthodromic track must be at least as long as the circumference of the Earth (hence 21,600 nautical miles).

British sailing journalist and author Bob Fisher published an article on Sail-World.com refuting the round the world claim. He said "True, Jessica has sailed alone and unassisted, passed under the four required capes, but the orthodromic route she has taken does not total the necessary 21,600 miles that is equivalent of the girth of the Earth at the equator. And that, Andrew Fraser, is a requirement for the world record you were claiming for Jessica, and which would put her in line to beat Jesse Martin's record."

Watson commented on this matter in her book True Spirit. She states that she wrote a number of letters to the WSSRC asking what she had to do to claim the record. Their answer was that she could not claim the record since age records were no longer recognised. She got the impression it was (according to WSSRC) not necessary to follow the route Jesse Martin followed (which went far north of the equator in the Atlantic), a route Watson knew well from reading Martin's book more than once.

In the book she also criticised those who criticised her management. Sail-World.com has written, "We don't believe she decided her route. People think we're criticising Jessica. We're not. We're criticising her management". She felt hurt by that, since it hinted that "He was suggesting that I was just a puppet, that I had no voice and no will of my own."

== Praise ==
Despite criticism, Watson has had her supporters, not only after, but before the departure. In particular, adventurer Don McIntyre strongly supported her attempt, providing her with a boat and speaking in support of her attempt. Similarly, Tony Mowbray, who, like McIntyre, has previously circumnavigated the globe, provided his support, arguing that she was "doing it for the right reasons" and that he was confident of her success. The captain of the Magic Roundabout spoke highly of her skills, backing her circumnavigation attempt by describing her as a "damn-good crew member" and stating that he believed that she possessed the necessary abilities. Also adventurer and company owner Richard Branson gave his support before departure.

During her journey others expressed their support for her attempt. Australian Prime Minister Kevin Rudd said in a public speech on 26 January that "Jessica Watson ... is an extraordinary young Australian." According to ABC News, competing circumnavigator Abby Sunderland congratulated Watson on rounding Cape Horn, "She's done an amazing job and I hope the rest of her trip goes as well as it has so far."

At the arrival in Sydney, she was met by thousands of spectators including then-Australian Prime Minister, Kevin Rudd. He said, "Jess, welcome back to dry land. Welcome back home to Australia. You know something, you may feel a little wobbly on your feet just now, but in the eyes of all Australians you now stand tall as our newest Australian hero." The crowd then sang a special rendition of Australia's national Anthem, "Advance Australia Fair", as a salute to Watson.

== Awards ==
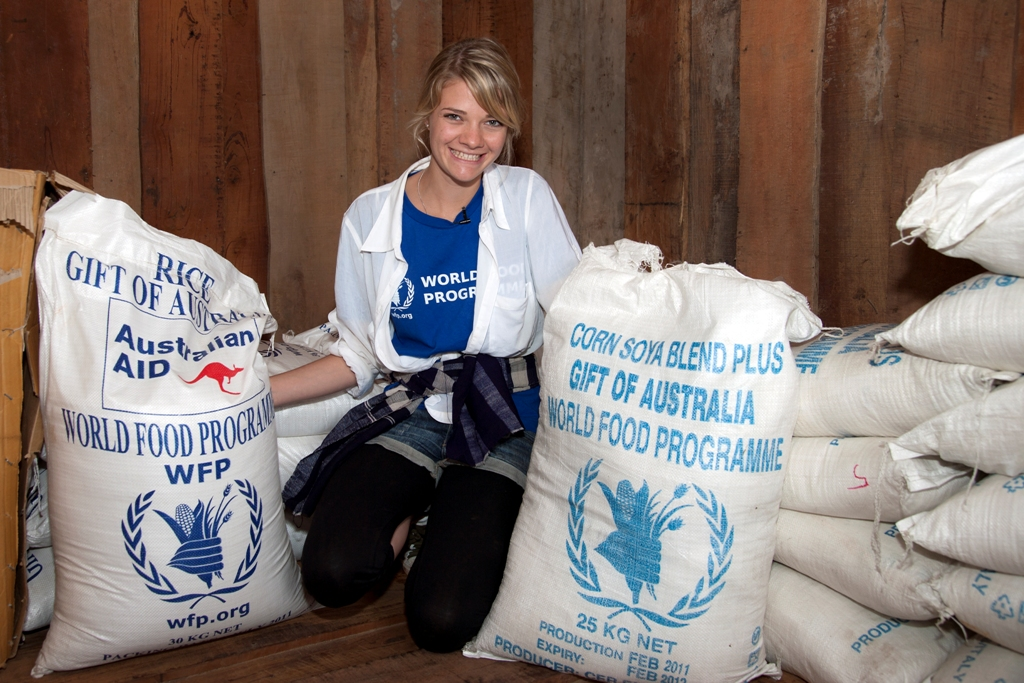
Watson in Laos as part of a program with the World Food Programme (WFP) in 2011. In 2011, she was appointed a WFP Youth Ambassador, a role she still served in as of 2017.

Since attempting her circumnavigation, Watson has been recognised with a number of awards. These include the "Spirit of Sport" award from the Sport Australia Hall of Fame, and "Young Performer of the Year" for 2010, an award voted by the Australian public and presented at the annual Sports Performer Awards in Melbourne.

Watson was named the Australian Geographic Society's Young Adventurer of the Year in 2010. She was selected as one of the ten international "2010 Adventurers of the Year" by National Geographic Society, and was the only sailor in the group.

Watson was named the Young Australian of the Year on 25 January 2011.

She was selected as one of the entrants to the Who's Who in Australia 2012 edition.

Watson was the first female skipper to cross the line in the 2011 Sydney to Hobart and as a result earned the Jane Tate trophy.

Watson received an Order of Australia Medal (OAM) in the Australia Day Honours List in January 2012 for service to sailing and to youth through the achievement of sailing solo and unassisted around the world, and as a role model for young Australians. In November 2022 she was inducted into the Australian Sailing Hall of Fame.

In 2015, Watson was awarded the Leif Erikson Young Explorer Award by the Exploration Museum, in Húsavík, Iceland.

== Further projects ==
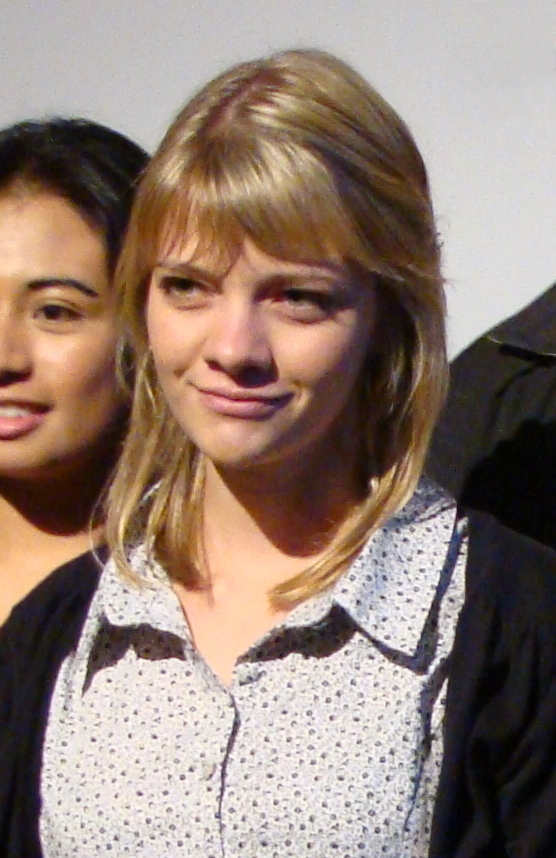
Watson at the 2011 Imagine Cup finals

Watson took part in the Mini Fastnet sailing race, in Europe, in June 2011, sailing a two-person mini sailboat with Scott Cavanough as skipper. Following the Mini Fastnet, she sailed the Round the Island Race in United Kingdom in June 2011, as a crew member with Phil Baughen as skipper and Michael Perham as third crew member, although they had to retire after boat damage. In August 2011 she sailed in the Sydney Gold Coast Yacht Race with part of her intended Sydney–Hobart crew using the boat Another Challenge. They won their class.

After that, she sailed in the Sydney to Hobart Yacht Race in December 2011, skippering Another Challenge with the youngest crew to ever compete in the race, consisting of ten people aged under 22, with Watson aged 18. The boat got the second place in its class, Sydney 38 One Design, with equal standard boats. This was considered a success, since all the other boats in the class had considerably older skippers.

She has studied marketing and communications at university. In 2015, she took a position as communications manager for Deckee, an online forum and business directory for the boating community.

== Personal life ==
Watson was in a long-term relationship with fellow sailor Cameron Dale, beginning in 2011. They remained a couple for 10 years until Dale's death in 2021, aged 29, caused by a stroke due to undiagnosed hypertension.

== In popular culture ==
A television documentary, 210 Days, was made about her voyage. It was narrated by Sir Richard Branson.

A film, True Spirit, about the voyage was produced in Queensland, starring Teagan Croft as Watson. It was produced by Netflix and released on 3 February 2023. The production was affected by the COVID-19 pandemic.

== See also ==
- List of youth solo sailing circumnavigations
- List of female adventurers

Awards
Preceded by Mark Donaldson	Young Australian of the Year; 2011	Succeeded by Marita Cheng
Preceded by None	Leif Erikson Young Explorer; 2015	Succeeded by Tashi and Nungshi Malik
