= List of youth solo sailing circumnavigations =

== Youth solo sailing circumnavigations ==
Sailor	Port of departure	Date of departure	Date completed	Duration (days)	Age at completion	Boat	Notes
Robin Lee Graham; US	Los Angeles, California, U.S.	27 July 1965	30 April 1970	1738	21 years, 56 days	Lapworth 24: Dove; Allied Luders 33: Return of Dove	Westerly, via Panama Canal. Solo, with stops and assistance.
Tania Aebi; US	New York City, New York, U.S.	28 May 1985	6 November 1987	892	21 years, 30 days	Contessa 26: Varuna	Westerly, via Panama Canal. Solo, with stops and assistance. Aebi had a passenger for a short stretch (80 nmi).
Brian Caldwell; US	Honolulu, Hawaii, U.S.	1 June 1995	20 September 1996	477	20 years, 278 days	Contessa 26: Mai Miti Vavau	Westerly, via northern Australia, Cape of Good Hope, Panama Canal. Solo with stops and assistance.
David Dicks; AUS	Fremantle, Australia	26 February 1996	17 November 1996	265	18 years, 42 days	S&S 34: Seaflight	Easterly, via Great capes. Solo, non-stop, with assistance.
Jesse Martin; AUS	Port Phillip Bay, Vic, Australia	8 December 1998	31 October 1999	327	18 years, 66 days	S&S 34: Lionheart	Easterly, via Great capes. Solo, non-stop, and unassisted.
Zac Sunderland; US	Marina del Rey, California, U.S.	14 June 2008	16 July 2009	396	17 years, 229 days	Islander 36: Intrepid	Westerly, via northern Australia, Cape of Good Hope, Panama Canal. Solo, with stops and assistance.
Michael Perham; UK	Portsmouth, England, U.K.	16 November 2008	27 August 2009	284	17 years, 164 days	Open 50: totallymoney.com	Easterly, via Cape of Good Hope and Panama Canal. Solo, with stops and assistance.
Jessica Watson; AUSNZ	Sydney, Australia	18 October 2009	15 May 2010	209	16 years, 362 days	S&S 34: Ella's Pink Lady	Easterly, via Great capes. Solo, non-stop, and unassisted, but the voyage was shorter than the required 21,600 nautical miles to be considered a global circumnavigation.
Laura Dekker; NED; NZL	Gibraltar	21 August 2010	21 January 2012	518	16 years, 123 days	Jeanneau Gin Fizz: Guppy	Westerly, via Panama Canal and Cape of Good Hope. Solo, with stops and assistance.

Abby Sunderland attempted on her boat Wild Eyes through a planned easterly circumnavigation in 2010 but did not complete due to bad weather on the remote area northeast of Kerguelen Islands.

Since the Jesse Martin voyage, records claimed for the youngest person to circumnavigate the world are not recognized by the World Sailing Speed Record Council, nor by any other formal council. Therefore, the strict route requirements of the WSSRC are not being followed for this list, and it is deemed sufficient for the sailors to cross all longitudes and the equator, before crossing their own path again.

Unassisted sailing essentially means that the sail boat does not dock in harbors, or with other boats and does not get equipment from outside during the voyage.

== See also ==
- Circumnavigation
- List of circumnavigations
- Around the world sailing record
