= Zac Sunderland =

American former sailor (born 1991)

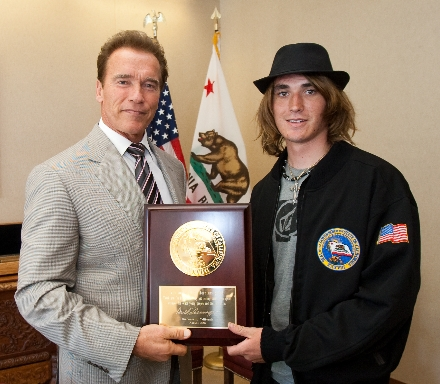
- Sunderland (right) with California Governor Arnold Schwarzenegger in August 2009
- Born: Zachary Tristan Sunderland; November 29, 1991 (age 34); Los Angeles, California, U.S.
- Occupation: Former sailor
- Known for: Held the record as the youngest person to sail solo around the world (with stops and assistance); first person under the age of 18 to complete a solo circumnavigation
- Television: The Amazing Race 19 (6th place)
- Parents: Laurence Sunderland (father); Marianne Sunderland (mother)

Zachary Tristan "Zac" Sunderland (born November 29, 1991) is an American former sailor who was the first person under age 18 to sail solo around the world. He completed his trip after 13 months and two days at sea on July 16, 2009, at age 17. The record was previously held by Australian David Dicks, and was surpassed on August 27, 2009 by Michael Perham of England. Sunderland is the youngest American to complete a circumnavigation, surpassing Brian Caldwell, who finished in 1996 at age 20. However, Sunderland's record was not recognized by Guinness World Records, or by the World Sailing Speed Record Council.

In 2010, one of Sunderland's younger sisters, Abby, attempted the feat. She was forced to call off her attempt after her boat was damaged in a storm in the Indian Ocean.

In 2011, Sunderland and his father Laurence participated in the 19th season of The Amazing Race. They ended up in sixth place out of 11 teams and were eliminated in Copenhagen, Denmark.

== Early life ==
The oldest of Marianne and Laurence Sunderland's eight children, Sunderland's first home was a 17-metre (56 ft) Tradewind sailboat. His family sailed in Australia, New Zealand, the UK, and Mexico. His shipwright father bought a 51 feet (16 m) Aleutian and the family made a three-year cruise of California's Channel Islands, Baja California and mainland Mexico.

== Voyage ==
When Sunderland decided to attempt the circumnavigation, he purchased a 36-foot (11 m) Islander 36 named Intrepid for $6,000, using all of his savings. With his father's assistance, he retrofitted the boat for the trip. Sunderland planned to complete his voyage in April 2009 with a maximum time of 18 months. He continued his schooling while sailing, saying, "I have all my books with me. I have one more year to finish at high school and I have to send back my tests (via e-mail) to my mom. She's going to grade them and make sure I am doing well."

Sunderland departed from Marina del Rey on June 14, 2008. The Intrepid featured the company logos of Shuman’s RealSweet, Mastronardi’s Sunset Produce, and his sponsor Produce for Kids, promoting healthy eating and produce consumption for children.

Sunderland crossed the Pacific to his first port of call, the Marshall Islands, then headed west to Papua New Guinea, then Australia, the Indian Ocean, Mauritius and Madagascar, rounding the Cape of Good Hope, sailing across the Atlantic, and finally transiting the Panama Canal/Galapagos Islands back to the Pacific and home.

Sunderland initially planned to make 15 to 30 stops around the world, the first of which was to be the Marshall Islands, Micronesia. Due to some minor work needed to be done on the boat, and the desire to reprovision, he re-routed to Hawaii. On July 11, Zac made his first stop at Emerald Bay, Catalina Island before heading on to Ala Wai Boat Harbor, Waikiki, off Diamond Head. He then headed towards the Marshall Islands (about 2,500 miles), on July 16, 2008.

On August 4, 2008, Marshall Islands President Litokwa Tomeing (a sailor in his youth) formally welcomed and congratulated Sunderland in the President's Office on Majuro: "And how is your boat? I remember one time I went with my parents on a 26- or 27-foot canoe and we sailed from Wotje to Arno." The U.S. Ambassador to the Marshall Islands, Clyde Bishop, welcomed Sunderland to Majuro U.S. Embassy on August 7.

Sailing from Majuro, Sunderland reached Darwin, Australia on September 18, 2008, with a faulty bilge pump and fuel problems forcing him a stop in Papua New Guinea. Sunderland had his first encounter with pirates on October 7 after leaving Darwin. 250 km off the Indonesian coast, in the Indian Ocean near Cocos Islands, he encountered a large 60–70-foot wooden fishing boat without flags. The pirates, after shadowing the Intrepid for some time, eventually lost interest and sped off, but not before Sunderland, as a precaution, had loaded his revolver and locked himself in his cabin.

Sunderland endured 25-knot winds and 10-foot seas for more than 24 hours on October 13. Amid continuing engine and fuel problems, a snapped boom, and a broken tiller needing repairs, Sunderland reached Cocos Islands (a.k.a. Keeling Islands) in the eastern Indian Ocean on October 14. He proceeded to Mauritius, thereby completing half of his expedition. Sunderland turned 17 on November 29, 2008, while at sea. Sunderland arrived in Durban, South Africa on December 14, after 10 days becalmed. He flew home on December 22 for Christmas and returned to South Africa afterward to resume his journey.

Sunderland took short hops to East London, Port Elizabeth, Mossel Bay, and finally got to Cape Town, where he had a chance meeting with Mike Perham, who was competing for the record as the world's youngest solo-circumnavigator, and Minoru Saito who, at 75, was making his eighth trip and held the record as the oldest solo, non-stop circumnavigator. After departing Cape Town, Sunderland continued to St. Helena and then across the Atlantic to Grenada. His next stop was Panama, where he crossed the canal into the Pacific. After stops in Mexico to dodge bad weather and repair a bulkhead, Sunderland tacked back up the coast to home, arriving July 16, 2009.

== Sailing route ==
- United States

- Marina del Rey, California
- Waikiki, Hawaii (unplanned stop)

- Majuro, Marshall Islands
- Port Moresby, Papua New Guinea (unplanned stop)
- Darwin, Australia
- Cocos-Keeling Islands, Territory of Australia
- Mauritius

- Rodrigues Island (unplanned stop)
- Port Louis, Mauritius

- South Africa

- Durban
- East London, South Africa
- Port Elizabeth, South Africa
- Mossel Bay, South Africa
- Cape Town, South Africa

- St. Helena, South Atlantic Ocean
- Grenada
- Panama

- Colón
- Panama City

- Mexico

- Marina Chahue, Huatulco (unplanned stop)
- Puerto de la Navidad Marina, Barra de Navidad (unplanned stop)

- United States

- San Diego, California (unplanned stop)
- Marina del Rey, California

== WSSRC not ratified ==
The World Sailing Speed Record Council (WSSRC), the world sailing authority, complimented Sunderland on his achievement but did not ratify it and further stated that the route did not meet the requirements for a circumnavigation voyage. According to John Reed, Secretary to the WSSRC, Sunderland used an engine at various times during the attempt, stopped, had assistance and did not sail around Cape Horn.

However, the American Sailing Association has ratified it, using less strict rules, just "circumnavigating alone".

== Honors ==
On September 19, 2009, Sunderland was grand marshal of the 14th annual Route 66 Parade in Duarte, California. On December 12, he was grand marshal of the 2009 Marina del Rey Holiday Boat Parade in Marina del Rey, California.

== See also ==
- List of youth solo sailing circumnavigations
