= Ellin =

Ellin may refer to:

- Abby Ellin, American author and journalist
- Doug Ellin (born 1968), American screenwriter and director
- Everett Ellin (1928-2011), American museum official, art dealer, engineer, lawyer, and talent agent
- Percy Ellin (1884-1959), Australian footballer
- Ray Ellin American comedian, talk show host, producer, writer, and director
- Robert Ellin (1837-1904), English-born American stone and wood sculptor
- Stanley Ellin (1916-1986), American mystery writer
- Tony Ellin (1965-2000), American professional pool player
