= Abbie =

Abbie is a unisex given name. Notable people with the given name include:

== Women ==
- Abbie Betinis (born 1980), American composer
- Abbie Boudreau (born 1979), American television news correspondent
- Abbie Breakwell (born 2003), British wheelchair tennis player
- Abbie Farwell Brown (1871–1927), American author
- Abbie Brown (rugby union) (born 1996), British rugby sevens player
- Abbie Burgess (1839–1892), American lighthouse keeper
- Abbie Cornett (born 1966), American politician
- Abbie Cornish (born 1982), Australian actress and rapper
- Abbie Eaton (born 1992), British racing driver
- Abbie Huston Evans (1881–1983), American poet and teacher
- Abbie Park Ferguson (1837–1919), American founder and president of Huguenot College in South Africa
- Abbie M. Gannett (1845–1895), American essayist, poet and philanthropist
- Abbie E. Krebs-Wilkins (1842–1924), American businesswoman
- Abbie K. Mason (1861–1908), Black American suffragist
- Abbie Mitchell (1884–1960), African-American operatic soprano
- Abbie Myers (born 1994), Australian tennis player
- Abbie Sweetwine (1921–2009), American military nurse, founder of modern paramedic medicine

== Men ==
- Albert Brunies (1900–1978), American jazz cornetist nicknamed "Abbie"
- Abbie Cox (1902–1985), Canadian ice hockey player
- Abbie Hoffman (1936–1989), American social and political activist
- Abbie Johnson (1871–1960), Canadian-born Major League Baseball player
- Abbie Moore, Canadian ice hockey player
- Abbie Newell (1897–1967), Canadian ice hockey player
- Abbie Rowe (1905–1967), American photographer
- Abbie Shaba (born 1958), Malawian politician
- Abbie Shadbolt (1887–1971), New Zealand rugby league player
- Abbie Wolanow, Israeli-born American soccer player in the early 1960s

== Fictional characters ==
- Abbie, a character from the upcoming video game Mindwave
- Abbie Carmichael, on the television show Law & Order, played by Angie Harmon
- Abbie Scrapple, in the American comic strip Abbie an' Slats (1937–1971)
