= Michael Perham =

English sailor and adventurer

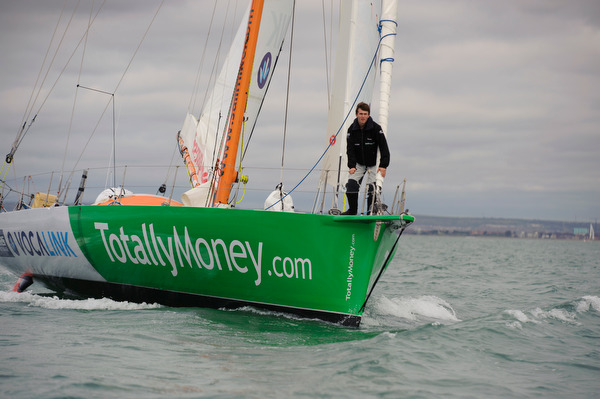
- Perham aboard his boat before setting off on his around-the-world attempt, 15 November 2008
- Born: 16 March 1992 (age 34); Hertfordshire, England, U.K.
- Occupation: Sailor
- Known for: Held the official record as the youngest person to sail solo around the world (with stops and assistance); second person under the age of 18 to complete a solo circumnavigation
- Parent(s): Heather and Peter Perham
- Website: Official website

Michael Perham (born 16 March 1992) is an English sailor and adventurer from Potters Bar. In 2007 at the age of 14 he became the youngest person in the world to successfully sail across the Atlantic Ocean single-handedly, beating the record set in 2003 by British sailor Seb Clover. In 2009 at the age of 17 he became the youngest person to sail around the world solo. Perham's second record surpassed that of Zac Sunderland, an older 17-year-old American, set only six weeks earlier. Following this, Perham's adventures included driving around the world and racing in many offshore races, most notably the Sydney to Hobart yacht race in 2011 where his team placed second in class.

== Education ==
Perham was educated at Chancellor's School, a state comprehensive foundation school, in the village of Brookmans Park in Hertfordshire.

== Life and career ==
In 2007, Perham became the youngest person in the world to successfully sail across the Atlantic Ocean single-handedly, when he helmed the 28 foot (8 metres) Cheeky Monkey between Gibraltar and Antigua with repair stops in the Canary Islands and Cape Verde between 18 November 2006 and 3 January 2007. That voyage ended when he sailed into Nelson's Dockyard in Antigua at 14:00 GMT after a 3500-mile voyage. His father crossed the Atlantic at the same time in a separate boat.

At the time, Perham was 14 years and 293 days old and he took the Guinness World Record from young Briton Seb Clover from Cowes on the Isle of Wight, who had crossed the Atlantic in late 2002 to early 2003, at the age of 15 years and 362 days.

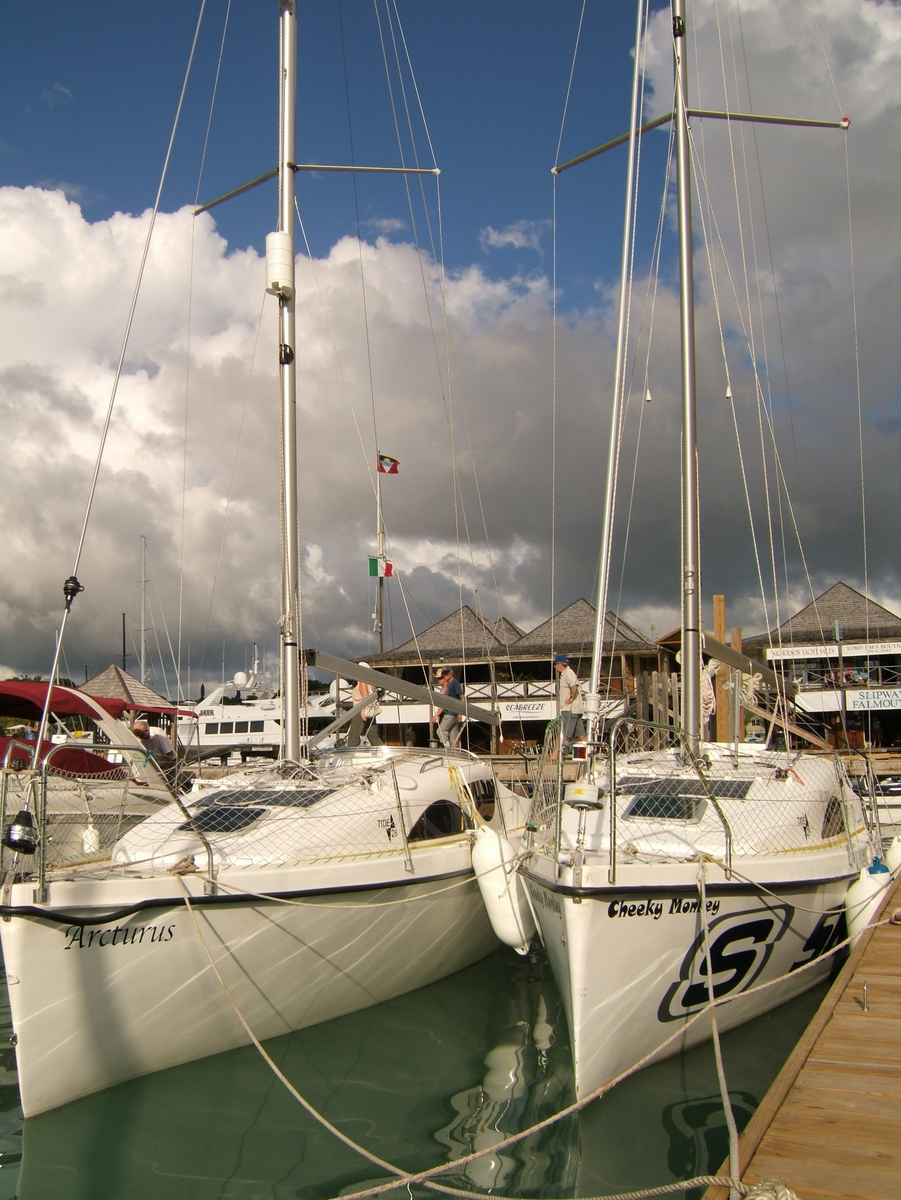
Michael Perham sailed across the Atlantic in Cheeky Monkey (pictured on the right) at the age of 14.

=== Global circumnavigation ===
On 15 November 2008, Perham began his solo non-stop circumnavigation around the world from Gunwharf Quays in Portsmouth, England, in his chartered Open 50 yacht, totallymoney.com (named after the principal sponsors). He had to sell the vessel he used on his previous record attempt to raise money for the new record attempt. The journey was planned to take four and a half months and to cover some 40,000 km (20,000 nmi). In fact he completed it on 27 August 2009. Perham was 16 when he began the journey, and turned 17 on 16 March 2009, while crossing the Indian Ocean making him the youngest solo round-the-world sailor.

Michael Perham arrives at Gunwharf Quays on 29 August 2009

If Perham's trip had gone wholly to plan, he would have been competing for the "unassisted non-stop" record, which is a different record than the assisted sailing record. However, multiple problems with the autopilot required that repairs be made in lengthy stopovers in Lisbon and the Canary Islands; then further stops were made in Cape Town, Hobart and Auckland. By March 2009 Perham had decided to aim for the record of the youngest solo circumnavigation, though he continued to make a continuous passage without use of his engine. The decision to accept assistance along the way, along with harsh winter conditions, led Perham to decide to travel through the Panama Canal rather than sail around Cape Horn.

Money raised from the voyage was to be donated to Save the Children and the Tall Ships Youth Trust.

Perham took the record from Zac Sunderland, an American who completed his journey in July 2009 at the age of 17 years, 7 months. However, Sunderland's record was not recognized by Guinness. Perham and Sunderland met unexpectedly in Cape Town, South Africa, in February 2009, along with Minoru Saito, a Japanese sailor who is the oldest person to circumnavigate the world solo.

The record was then challenged by younger sailors. Jessica Watson from Australia (whom Michael met when he stopped in Australia) has done a solo non-stop voyage, completed 15 May 2010. They are near friends. Abby Sunderland from the USA (sister to Zac Sunderland) departed on 23 January 2010, on a journey similar to Perham's. She used a race boat, planned non-stop, but had to make stops for repairs - however, after a demasting it was announced that she would be giving up her attempt. The 16-year-old Laura Dekker from The Netherlands became the youngest solo-round-the-world sailor, albeit with planned stops. She finished in Sint Maarten on 21 January 2012.

Perham has subsequently written a book about the journey, called Sailing the Dream, released 18 March 2010 (ISBN 0-593-06598-0).

=== Homecoming ===
Perham officially crossed the finishing line at 09:47:30 local time on 27 August 2009. He was escorted across the line by HMS Mersey (a Royal Navy guard ship), a Royal Naval helicopter and a flotilla of small boats, mostly carrying people from the press and media.

Perham's official homecoming reception and press conference was at Gunwharf Quays in Portsmouth on 29 August 2009, where he was met by friends, family and Vendée Globe yachtsman Tony Bullimore. Shortly after landing back on shore, Perham was handed his framed Guinness World Record certificate.

Michael Perham arrives back at Gunwharf Quays, 29 Aug 2009

Michael Perham greeted by Tony Bullimore

Michael Perham with Guinness World Record certificate

== Following challenges ==
Perham planned to take part in a challenge called the Bounty Boat Expedition, led by Don McIntyre, sailing a very small open boat without any navigational aids at all in the path of the small boat sailed by the crew from the mutiny on the Bounty in 1798. However, on 28 March 2010 Perham announced on his website that because of medical problems following a recent operation he wouldn't be fit enough to participate in the expedition.

Perham took part in the Sydney to Hobart Yacht Race 2011 as a crew member with Jessica Watson as skipper.

In 2012 Perham drove around the world in a camper van. This journey took him from the UK, east through Russia, and all the way down through Asia to Singapore. He then drove across Australia and New Zealand before the final leg of his journey from Anchorage in Alaska to New York.

== See also ==
- List of youth solo sailing circumnavigations
