= Jesse Martin =

Australian sailor and circumnavigator

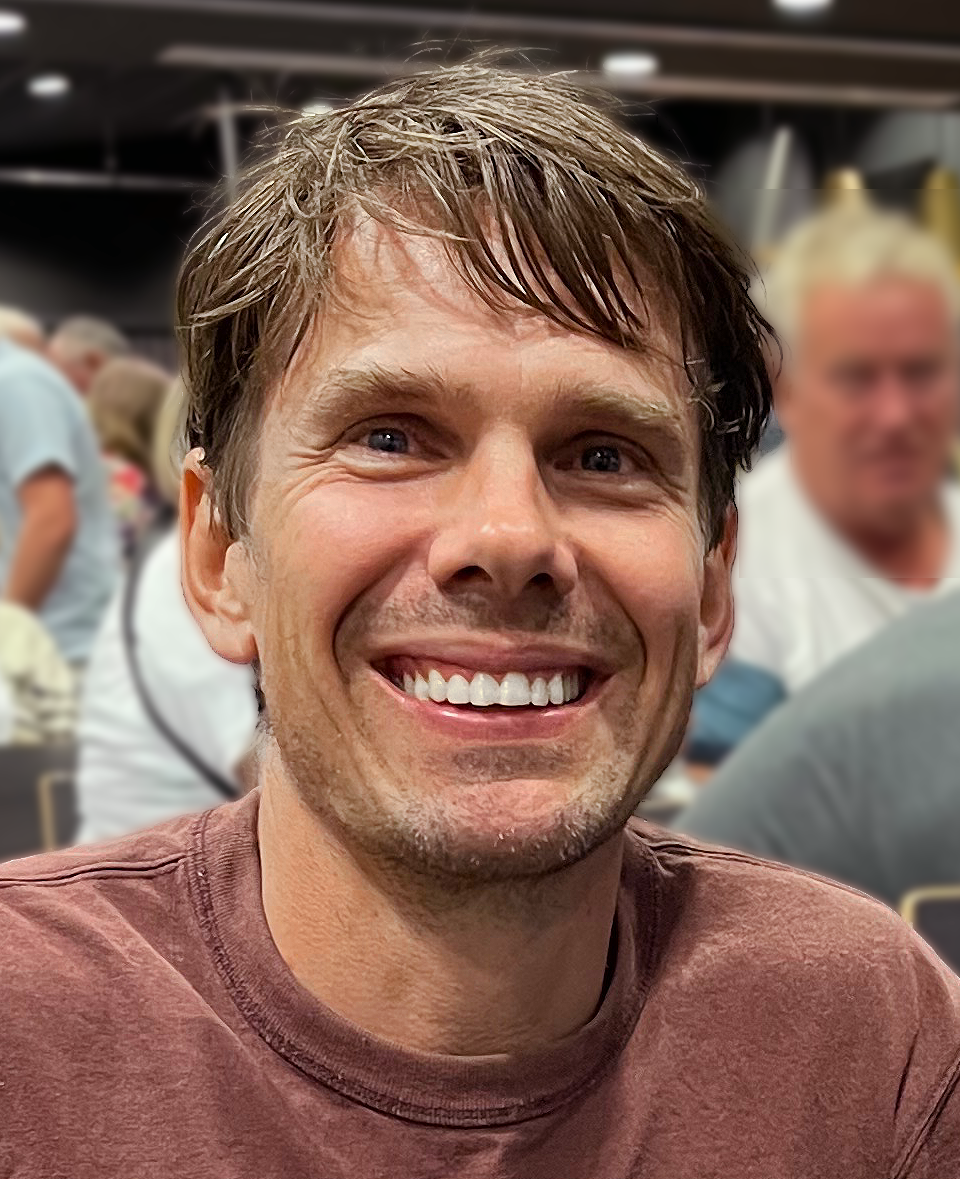
- Martin in 2023
- Born: 26 August 1981 (age 45); Dachau, West Germany
- Known for: Holding the record as the youngest person to sail solo around the world (unassisted)
- Website: lionheart.fund

Jesse Martin, OAM (born 26 August 1981) is an Australian sailor who in 1999, at age 18, became the youngest person to circumnavigate the globe solo, non-stop and unassisted. His journey in the 10-metre (34 ft) S&S 34 sloop Lionheart-Mistral took approximately 11 months. He chronicled his adventures in the book Lionheart: A Journey of the Human Spirit, and his story was made into a documentary, Lionheart: The Jesse Martin Story.

== Lionheart voyage ==
At 17, Martin departed Melbourne for a world voyage on his yacht, Lionheart. He arrived back in Melbourne on 31 October 1999 and sailed into the record books at age 18. The entire journey covered 328 days and 27,000 nautical miles (50,000 km) in all. Since Martin's voyage, the World Sailing Speed Record Council (WSSRC) have discontinued the "youngest" category and no longer recognise "human condition" records. Martin remains the youngest solo non-stop unassisted sailor to cross opposite points of the globe in a single round-the-world voyage. His voyage inspired other young sailors, including Jessica Watson, to attempt similar circumnavigations.

The voyage was sponsored by Mistral Appliances, the Herald Sun, Sandringham Yacht Club, Kodak, REV milk and Autohelm. Mistral was the major sponsor, donating over A$300,000 on the conditions that the name was placed on the sail, prominently and repeatedly on the boat, on the bottom of Martin's weekly newspaper column, and on Martin's clothing.

Prior to the Lionheart voyage Martin, along with his father and brother, completed a 1,000 km journey along the North Queensland coast in a 4.3 m (14 ft) Caper Cat, one of the longest attempted in a catamaran of its size. In an interview following the trip, Martin stated that the journey made the idea of sailing around the world seem possible.

== Post Lionheart activities ==
Martin lives in Melbourne and has started a media production company, as well as a Papua New Guinea sailing adventure charter business. In 2005, he released a follow-up book entitled Kijana: The Real Story. In January 2009 Martin walked away uninjured after crashing his car into a train at a railway level crossing at McKinnon railway station in Melbourne. In 2010 Martin shared producing and directing credits for 5 Lost at Sea, a film documenting an attempted second circumnavigational voyage, this time with several friends.

Martin wrote and directed the 2022 documentary The Voyage of Madmen, about the 2018 recreation of the first around-the-world solo yacht race.

== Awards ==
Martin was the Australian Yachting Federation's Youth Sailor of the Year for the year 1999–2000 and the Young Victorian of the Year in 2000. He was awarded the Centenary Medal in 2001 and the Medal of the Order of Australia (OAM) in 2002.

== See also ==
- List of youth solo sailing circumnavigations

Awards and achievements
| Preceded by George Dukas | Young Victorian of the Year; 2000 | Succeeded by Daniela Di Toro |
