= Aby (name) =

Disambiguation page

Aby is a given name and a surname. Notable people with these names include:

== Given name ==
- Abey Belasco (1797–1830), English bare-knuckle boxer (also known as Aby)
- Aby Tom Cyriac (21st century), Indian composer, arranger and music producer
- Aby Gartmann (1930–2018), Swiss bobsledder
- Aby Har Even (1937–2021), Israeli military scientist and Director General of the Israeli Space Agency
- Aby King (born 1977), British novelist
- Aby Maraño (born 1992), Filipino volleyball player
- Aby Rosen (born 1960), German-American real estate developer
- Aby Warburg (1866–1929), German art historian and cultural theorist

== Nickname ==
- George "Åby" Ericsson (1919–2002), Swedish footballer and coach

== Surname ==
- Aaron Aby (born 1990), Welsh mixed martial artist and former footballer
- Hulette F. Aby (1879–1935), American attorney
- Jessica Aby (born 1998), Ivorian women's footballer
- Samuel Aby (21st century), Indian composer

== See also ==
- Abie
- Abby
