= Unassisted sailing =

Form of sailing

Unassisted sailing is a form of sailing, usually single-handed, where sailors are not given any physical assistance during the entire course of the voyage. Sailors may not call at a port, dock with other ships at sea, or be passed any physical objects from a passing ship or aircraft prior to reaching the end destination of their voyage.

== Definition ==
Unassisted sailing definition and rules are widely recognised as those set by the World Sailing Speed Record Council rule 21e. Essentially this and the related 21h and 21i rules require that during the voyage:

- No assistance of any kind be given except as allowed by 21h and 21i.
- No supplies be taken on board (other than the "harvest of the sea").
- A boat may be anchored or beached for repairs, but such repairs must be done entirely by the boat's crew with the tools and materials already on board.
- The boat may not enter port.

The exceptions allowed by 21h and 21i are:

- All forms of navigation equipment and communication are permitted. The sailor may receive advice, but must operate all equipment themselves. There must be no physical remote control
- If the boat runs afoul of another vessel or structure, it is permitted for that vessel's or structure's crew to lend assistance in getting clear.
- Engines may not be used, except for emergencies such as a man overboard, or giving emergency assistance.

== In practice ==
In practice such sailors can receive financial and electronic assistance, especially when sponsored to attempt records, which reduces the burden of lack of physical assistance significantly. The Sydney Morning Herald said in this context:

"...(and without wanting to detract from her incredible achievement), it is fair to say Watson was by no means solo or unassisted in her voyage around the world; a team of advisors and experts meticulously guided her through that process."

— Nina Funnell, Sydney Morning Herald

== Vendée Globe ==
The Vendée Globe is a solo, non-stop,around-the-world race starting from France. It has its own more strict rules. The participants can be given generally available weather forecasts, but not individual advice about weather or routing. All kinds of repair advice over radio is allowed, for the reason it is a sail competition, not a repair competition. Medical advice is also allowed, with some limitation.

== Danger reduced by EPIRBs ==
The dangers of unassisted sailing have been reduced in recent years by the widespread use of EPIRBs that allow the sailor to summon help even when far from land. One such case occurred in January 1997 when Tony Bullimore was rescued by the Australian Navy after 5 days under a capsized yacht far from the Australian mainland. A few decades earlier this situation would have had a high probability of resulting in his death. EPIRBs greatly increase the chance that the sailor will be found. They have been credited by sailors as being "vital for sailing boats" and "without question" have saved lives.

== Respect accorded unassisted sailors ==
People such as Kay Cottee who complete long unassisted voyages are commonly accorded a considerable amount of respect, because the sailor still faces for a long period the prospect of death at sea. This respect usually extends to single-handed sailors such as Francis Chichester and Joshua Slocum who completed round-the-world voyages with far less assistance and considerably more risk than today's record holders, but which are regarded under current rules as "assisted" because of port stops during the voyage. Jessica Watson became the youngest person, at age 16, to sail unassisted around the world on 22 May 2010.
