= David Dicks =

Australian sailor (born 1978)

- Born: 6 October 1978 (age 47)
- Occupation: Sailor
- Known for: Held the record as the youngest person to sail solo around the world (assisted)

David Griffiths Dicks, OAM, CitWA, (born 6 October 1978) is an Australian sailor. He became the youngest person to sail non-stop and solo around the world. In February 1996, at the age of 17, he set out from Fremantle, Western Australia in his family's 10m S&S 34 sloop named 'Seaflight'. During his 9-month circumnavigation, he faced many challenges such as numerous knockdowns, bad weather, equipment failure, and food poisoning. Because of accepting a bolt to fix his rig near the Falkland Islands, his circumnavigation was not considered unassisted. He returned safely to Fremantle in November 1996 amid great fanfare, including a ticker-tape parade and being given the 'keys' to Perth City.

In 1999 he was awarded the Medal of the Order of Australia (OAM). David held the youngest (assisted) solo circumnavigation record for 13 years, from 1996 to 2009. By some accounts he still holds the unofficial record for the youngest solo non-stop assisted circumnavigation. Jessica Watson captured the unofficial youngest age record in May 2010 with an unassisted solo circumnavigation, but her course did not meet the minimum orthodromic distance requirement of 21,600 nautical miles set by the WSSRC. Jesse Martin completed a solo non-stop unassisted circumnavigation in 1999, he was 24 days older than Dicks at the completion of Dicks' voyage.

== See also ==
- Circumnavigation
- List of youth solo sailing circumnavigations
