= Jon Sanders =

Australian yachtsman (born 1939)

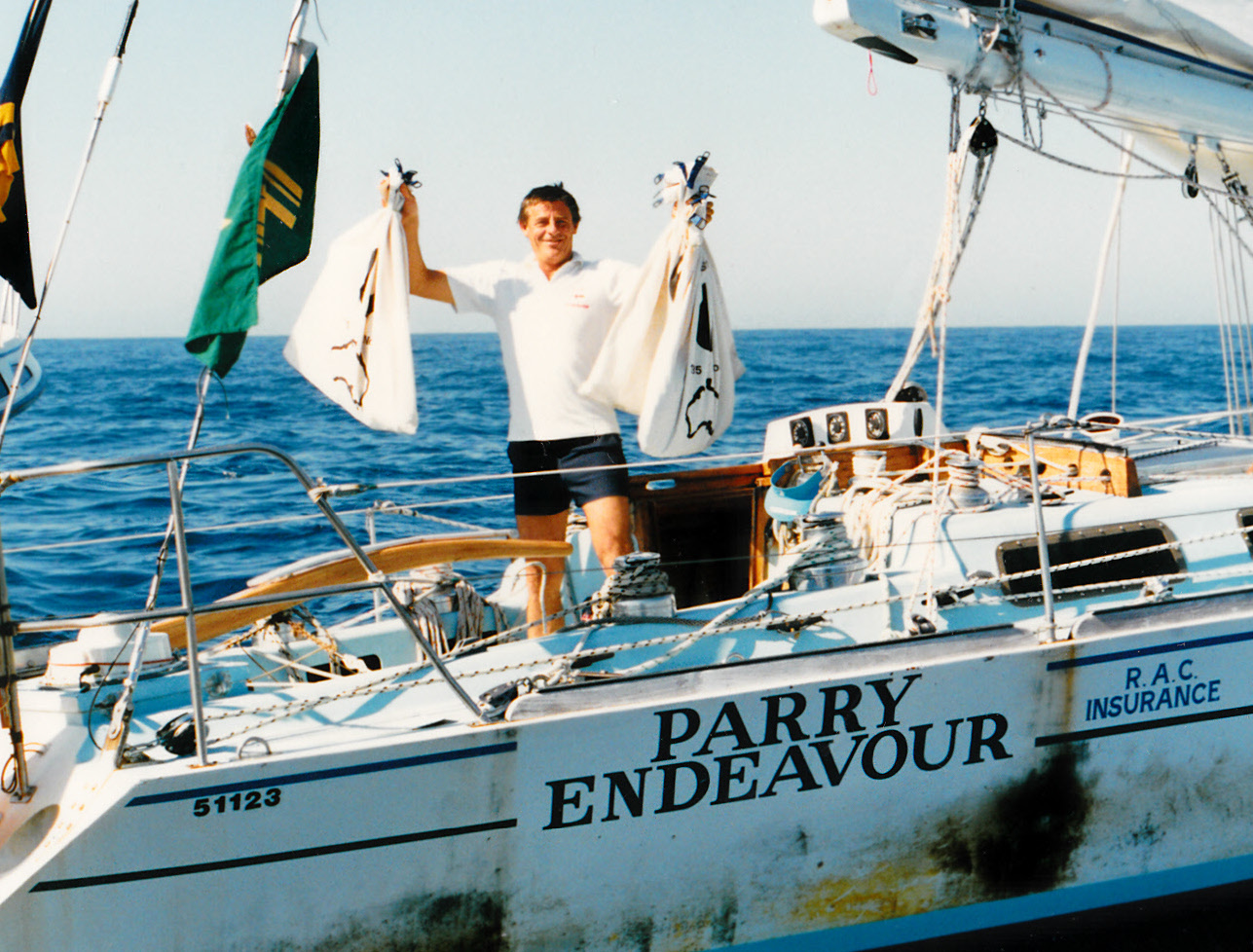
During his solo triple circumnavigation of the globe in 1987, Jon Sanders pauses off Fremantle to receive fan mail

Jon Sanders AO OBE (born 1939 in Perth, Western Australia) is an Australian yachtsman.

== Early years ==
Born to Colsell Sanders, a professor at the University of Western Australia, and Dorothy Lucie Sanders, a well-known romance novelist, Jonathan William Sanders grew up in Perth and in his teens and twenties, worked with shearing teams for 17 years. Initially he was a wool classer/shearing contractor, shearing team overseer and later owner of his own shearing team. He is characterised by his well-built stature and his shy and reserved demeanour. Jon is a close friend and mentor of fellow Western Australian solo-sailor David Dicks.

== Accomplishments ==
Jon Sanders was the first man to circumnavigate Antarctica solo, circling the continent twice in 1981 – 1982. For this accomplishment, Gate 17 of the new Antarctica Cup Racetrack has been named after him, with sector 17 named after the S&S 34 monohull Perie Banou, the yacht he had used during the circumnavigation. Sanders Gate is positioned mid-way round the Indian Ocean zone; the gate is close to where Sanders suffered a 180-degree knockdown. During the voyage, he passed south of the three great capes: Horn, Good Hope and Leeuwin, before rounding Cape Horn a second time. He turned north to Plymouth, UK and returning south around Good Hope and returning to Fremantle.

This voyage was recognised in the Guinness Book of Records through the following records:

- The first single-handed sailor to remain continuously at sea twice around the world
- First single-handed sailor to round the five southernmost capes twice on one voyage
- First single-handed sailor to round the five southernmost capes twice
- Longest distance continuously sailed by any yacht: 48,510 miles (78,070 km).
- Longest period alone at sea during a continuous voyage: 419 days: 22 hours: 10 minutes

In 1986 Sanders set out again from Fremantle, and this time completed three solo non-stop circumnavigations aboard his 47-foot (14 m) yacht Parry Endeavour, rounding Saint Peter and Saint Paul Archipelago just north of the Equator each time to ensure that his course covered both hemispheres.

Bob Williams, the Chairman of Antarctica Cup Management and the Antarctica Cup Ocean Race, says: "What Jon achieved during his double circumnavigation in 1981/82 was truly remarkable, given the technology available at the time and size of his yacht. I have had the greatest respect for Jon ever since watching him set off in a full gale off Plymouth at the start of the Parmelia Yacht Race in 1979 and was very pleased to be a contributing sponsor for his next yacht Parry Endeavour in 1986/87. His achievement is an inspiration to all long distance ocean racing sailors and we are very happy to honour Jon now by naming this Gate 17 Sanders Gate and Sector 17 after his yacht Perie Banou"

On 2 November 2016, Sanders set out from Carnarvon, Western Australia on his tenth circumnavigation, which he completed on 20 December 2017.

On 31 January 2021 Sanders completed his eleventh circumnavigation, which makes the 81 year old one of the oldest persons to sail singlehanded around the world.

Parry Endeavour is now in the WA Maritime Museum, in Fremantle, Western Australia.

== Other recognitions ==
Sanders was made an Officer in the Order of the British Empire for sailing in the 1983 New Year's Honours. He was made an Officer of the Order of Australia (AO) in the 1989 Australia Day Honours for "service to sailing and to marine science".

Sanders was inducted into the Single-Handed Sailor's Hall of Fame in Newport, Rhode Island, USA in 1991.

Sanders' records include: (From S-HSoF website)

- 1970 First solo circumnavigation trip east to west mostly sailing through tropics.
- 1981–82 Double nonstop solo circumnavigation west to east via Southern Ocean.
- Triple non-stop solo circumnavigation:
  - 25 May 1986 left Fremantle headed east.
  - 29 January 1987 Rendezvous off Fremantle to mark first circumnavigation.
  - 13 March 1988 returned from 657 days 21 hours and 18 minutes at sea, completing three non-stop solo circumnavigations.

Guinness World Records cites this as "the longest distance sailed non-stop by any vessel". (71,023 nautical miles)

In 1988, Stateships named a cargo ship the Jon Sanders. In 2018 Sanders was inducted to the Australian Sailing Hall of Fame.

Jon Sanders Way, in Osborne Park was named after him.
