= Seb Clover =

English record-breaking sailor and paramedic

Sebastian Clover
- Born: 15 January 1987 (age 39)
- Education: Ryde School with Upper Chine, Isle of Wight; Plymouth University
- Occupations: Paramedic; Yachtsman
- Known for: Sailing solo across the Atlantic at 15
- Parent(s): Dolores and Ian Clover

Sebastian Clover (born 15 January 1987) is an English record-breaking sailor and paramedic.

Clover is a former young adventurer from Cowes on the Isle of Wight in England, who, at the age of 15 years and 362 days, was the youngest person in the world to successfully sail across the Atlantic Ocean single-handedly (in late 2002 – early 2003). Another young Briton, Michael Perham, surpassed his record in 2007.

Clover also allegedly crossed the English Channel single-handedly at the age of 11, which led his mother to dare him to cross the Atlantic Ocean next.

== Education ==
Clover was educated at Ryde School with Upper Chine, a co-educational independent school in the seaside town of Ryde, on the Isle of Wight, followed by the University of Plymouth (subsequently renamed Plymouth University for marketing purposes), in 2005.

== The record ==
From 19 December 2002 to 12:50 GMT on 12 January 2003, Seb raced his father across the Atlantic Ocean for 2,700 nautical miles (5,000 km) between Santa Cruz de Tenerife on the Canary Islands and Nelson's Dockyard on Antigua. Both father and son sailed identical 32 feet (9.8 m) Contessa 32 yachts. Seb made the crossing in a yacht called Reflection, his father in one called Xixia.

The voyage did not pass without problems. Both racers had close encounters with killer whales and rigging problems meant Seb was unable to catch up with his father. He had to repair a shroud fixture that broke in heavy weather. His priority became to keep the mast standing and finish without pushing the boat too much.

Seb eventually lost the race and arrived in Antigua a day behind his father when he was 15 years and 362 days old. He lost his title in January 2007, when Michael Perham made the crossing at the age of 14.

== Awards ==
In the aftermath of his achievement, Clover received several awards. He was named Best Prodigy of the Year by the Duchess of York in the second edition of Britain's Brilliant Prodigies Awards. He also received the Young Sportsman Award in the BBC South Sports Awards 2003 and the Raymarine Young Sailor of the Year Award 2003 which was announced at the Schroders London Boat Show.
