= Abby Moon Zeciroski =

American mixed media artist (born 1973)

- Born: Abby Zeciroski; 18 February 1973 (age 53); Chicago, Illinois
- Education: School of the Art Institute of Chicago
- Known for: Mixed Media, evoke emotions

Abby Moon Zeciroski (born 18 February 1973) is an American mixed media artist known for her contemporary art. Her art delves into various themes and has been exhibited in numerous museums, and her achievements have been featured in publications such as The New York Times and Windy City Times.

== Artist themes ==
Zeciroski's artistic practice encompasses a wide range of social issues, including childhood trauma and mental illness. She explores subjects such as gender inequality, racial injustice, homophobia, reproductive rights, war, rape culture, climate change, as well as themes of death, dying, and disability.

== Art censorship ==
Zeciroski has encountered instances of censorship on various social media platforms, such as Facebook and Pinterest, when her work has been perceived as offensive or divisive. Notably, her attempts to raise awareness regarding the correlation between religion, LGBTQ+ youth, and suicide risk have been subject to restrictions or removal. These incidents give rise to concerns about the influence of social media platforms in defining acceptable artistic expression and their impact on artistic discourse and engagement. Political artwork, including pieces related to former President Donald Trump, has also been prohibited, contributing to ongoing debates concerning art censorship in the digital age.

== Notable work ==
Zeciroski's work, titled "Black Lives Matter", gained recognition when it was featured in The New York Times on June 5, 2019. The artwork appeared in an article titled "The World Is on Fire: Artists Respond to the Protest" by Antonio Luca and Jaspal Rivait. Zeciroski created the artwork in response to the events surrounding George Floyd and Black Lives Matter, aiming to convey a message of unity among people. The artwork prominently depicts a black girl. Its inclusion in The New York Times brought attention to the piece and stimulated discussions about ongoing protests and societal issues. The artwork showcases Zeciroski's exploration of critical themes through their artistic expression.

One artwork of note is "Heartless Crimes", which explores themes related to animal welfare, including slaughterhouses, animal testing, and their connection to global warming. The artwork has gained recognition for its artistic merits and was chosen for inclusion in an international jury exhibition at the Reece Museum. Furthermore, "Heartless Crimes" received an award and monetary prize, highlighting its achievements within the art community. The artwork encourages discussions and raises awareness about important issues concerning animal welfare and environmental concerns."

Another notable artwork series, "CPTSD", comprises three noteworthy pieces: "Hell History and Healing'"(2020), "Trembles as it Glows" (2021), and "You're Going to Do Bad Things to Children" (2022). The series examines Zeciroski's childhood, encompassing themes of neglect, abuse, mental illness, generational trauma, and organized crime. It also explores the connection of these experiences with mental illness, chronic pain, fatigue, fibromyalgia, and disabilities. The series has been selected for display at Northern Illinois University's NIU Art Museum as part of the exhibition "Stories from My Childhood".

== Awards and recognition ==
Zeciroski has received recognition for her work, including several awards and achievements throughout her career. In 2022, she received the 10th Anniversary Award and Prize at the Fletcher International Jury Exhibition held at East Tennessee State University’s Reece Museum. She was also selected as one of the final three artists out of 10,000 entries in the Spirit of Liberty Art Competition in 1991. In 1994, Zeciroski achieved first place at the Found Recyclable Objects Art Exhibition at Kishwaukee College. Zeciroski's artwork has been positively received at the South Holland Annual Art Show, earning honorable mention in 1991. Furthermore, she received the Creative Achievement Award in 1991 and was nominated for scholarships at the School of the Art Institute of Chicago in 1991 and 1992.

== Museums ==
Zeciroski's artwork has been exhibited in several museums and institutions, including the University of Arizona Museum of Art, East Tennessee State University's Reece Museum, and NIU Art Museum. Her exhibitions have also been hosted at various venues, such as the Kane Space Project in Chicago, Illinois, Legacy Lab in Sacramento, California, and Kishwaukee College in Malta, Illinois.

== Giving back ==
Zeciroski has organized charitable initiatives aimed at assisting individuals experiencing homelessness in Chicago. She has contributed to The Crib LGBTQIA+ emergency youth shelter, Deborah's Place (a shelter for homeless women), and individuals living on the streets. Zeciroski has also shown support for the Tree House Cat Shelter by participating in fundraising events such as the Chicago Marathon and Monster Dash Half Marathon. These initiatives contribute to raising awareness for the cat shelter's cause and helping the homeless community in Chicago.

== Selected museums and institutions ==
- 2024 - "Injustice Unveiled: A Feminist Art Revolt" at International Women's Day Art Exhibition, Chicago, IL
- 2023 - "Stories From My Childhood" National Jury Exhibition at NIU Art Museum, Dekalb IL
- 2022 - "Bold Feminist Artist" at City Life, New York CIty, NY
- 2022 - "Social and Politically Engaged Art" at ETSU Art Museum, Tenn.
- 2021 - "Picturing 2020: A Community Reflects" National Exhibition at The University of Arizona Museum of Art, Tucson, AZ
- 2020 - "Black Lives Matter Exhibition" at Legacy Lab, Sacramento, CA
- 2020 - "The Fletcher International Jury Exhibition" at Reece Museum Johnson City, TN
- 2019 - "The Fletcher International Jury Exhibition" at Reece Museum, Johnson City, TN
- 2018 - "Exhibition: Leaders We Love and Despise" at Kane Space Project, Chicago, IL
- 1994 - "Found Recyclable Objects Exhibit" Kishwaukee College, Malta, IL
- 1992 - "South Holland Annual Art Exhibition, South Holland, IL
