= Mistral Appliances =

Australian home appliances brand

Mistral
- Type: Privately held company
- Industry: Appliance Manufacturing
- Founded: 1968
- Headquarters: Adelaide, South Australia
- Area served: Australia
- Key people: Simon Gerard, Anthony Olsen
- Parent: Gerard Retail
- Website: Mistral Australia; Mistral Malaysia

Mistral is an Australian home appliances brand which manufactures kitchen appliances, heating and cooling fans, air fryers, thermo cookers, electronics, and other appliances. Mistral was established in 1968. It is a subsidiary of Gerard Sourcing & Manufacturing.

Mistral has been a sponsor of the Adelaide Crows, and have also sponsored the boat that Jesse Martin used when he held the record as the youngest person to sail around the world solo.

Mistral was purchased by Gerard Industries in 1990, while being managed by Robert Gerard.

== See also ==
- Magnavox
- A. E. Gerard
- Robert Gerard
- Simon Gerard
