= Baltimar Notos =

History
- Namesake: Jon Sanders
- Builder: Zhong Ghua Shipyard
- Yard number: 8602
- Completed: January 1988
- Identification: IMO number: 8607658

General characteristics
- Tonnage: 2,854 GRT, 3,189 DWT
- Propulsion: Burmeister & Wain 4L35 MC
- Speed: 13 knots

Baltimar Notos is a cargo ship. Built by Zhong Ghua Shipyard and commissioned as the Baltimar Venus, it subsequently operated for other shipping lines under a variety of names.

== History ==
Built by Zhong Ghua Shipyard, Shanghai as the Baltimar Venus, it was completed in January 1988. It was bareboat chartered to Stateships and renamed Jon Sanders on 21 March 1988.

It was returned to owner its in January 1991 and renamed Baltimar Venus. Later in 1991 it was chartered to Kemaman Feeder Services, Malaysia as the Permint Suria, being renamed Baltimar Notos in 1994 then Industrial Navigator in 1996, Baltimar Notos in 1997, Industrial Spirit in 2001 and Baltimar Notos in 2001. As at 2006 it was still listed on the Lloyd's Register.
