= Parmelia Yacht Race =

Sailing event in the 150th anniversary of Western Australia

The Parmelia Race, Plymouth to Perth, 1979 was a feature event of the Western Australian 150th Anniversary Celebrations, 1979. Competitors were invited to recreate the 1829 voyage of the merchant barque Parmelia bringing the first British settlers to the Swan River Colony. The race was organised by the Royal Perth Yacht Club of Western Australia and sponsored by the Parmelia Hilton International in Perth.

The course was Plymouth – Cape Town – Fremantle, a distance of 19,535 kilometres (10,548 nmi) by the shortest route; the great-circle distance. In the North Atlantic the conditions were variable. Yachts expect fresh and mainly adverse winds on leaving the English Channel before skirting around the calms of the North Atlantic High. The North-East Trade Winds follow, fresh and favourable winds right down to the doldrums, where there are more calms interspersed with tropical storms. Into the South Atlantic the fleet faced the challenge of the adverse South-East Trades before having to negotiate the South Atlantic High and then finding fresh Westerlies which pushed the fleet towards Cape Town. Leg 2 was to present tricky conditions on departure from Cape Town prior to entering fresh and favorable Westerlies. Yachts following the great circle had to venture down to 45° south latitude, into the very vigorous Roaring Forties. And the final approaches to Fremantle could also be tricky.

In an endeavour to shorten the arrival period in Fremantle, two new formats were introduced to the world of long-distance ocean racing. The formats proved to be popular and more than 50 entries were received. However, only 27 started in Plymouth and the other joined the fleet in Cape Town for leg 2. At the time it was claimed to be the biggest fleet to contest an inter-ocean yacht race; i.e., a race which traverses more than one ocean.

== IOR Division ==
Ocean racing yachts rating between 6.1 and 21.3 metres (20 and 70 ft) when measured under the International Offshore Rule were invited to enter, and each leg of the race was run as a "pursuit" race. This necessitated "Fixed Handicaps" using the Time-on-Distance handicapping system. A "Handicap Distance" was allotted to each leg which, taking into consideration the wind systems to be encountered, reflected the most likely distance to be sailed by the "average" yacht. The handicaps for each leg then decided each yacht's starting date. Then, after minor changes to the finishing times, the "Corrected Finishing Times" decided the order of placings in each leg. The Overall placings were decided by the combined "Corrected Times" of both legs.

IOR Fleet in Handicap Order:

1. Ilusion (representing Spain), Noray 43 sloop, 13.00 metres (length overall), Enrique Vidal (skipper)
2. Bubblegum (Scotland), Contessa 43 sloop, 13.03 metres, Iain McGowan Fyfe
3. Thor (South Africa), Montevideo 43 sloop, 13.10 metres, Dr. Ken Warr - Leg 2 only
4. Parmelia (Western Australia), Curran 46 cutter, 13.90 metres, Bob Williams
5. Spirit of Ramfish IV (Netherlands), Suncoast 50 cutter, 15.25 metres, Adriaan van Stolk - Leg 1 & Rob Kwekkeboom - Leg 2
6. Independent Endeavour (Western Australia), Swan 65 ketch, 19.66 metres, Skip Novak King's Legend
7. Gauloises 3 (France), one-off sloop, 19.20 metres, Phillipe Facque.
8. Seltrust Endeavour (England), one-off staysail schooner, 17.02 metres, Capt. Mike Durham
9. Anaconda II (Australian Armed Services), one-off ketch, 25.45 metres, Josko Grubic
10. Siska (Western Australia), one-off sloop, 23.47 metres, Rolly Tasker

Whilst Independent Endeavour was a Western Australian entry, it's skipper, Skip Novak, was an American who had navigated the Swan 65 sloop King's Legend into second place in the second Whitbread Round the World Race. And Skip put together an experienced international crew.

The fleet departed Plymouth between 28 August and 6 September. Independent Endeavour was the first into Cape Town on 12 October followed by Gauloises 3, Spirit of Ramfish IV and Siska. Then the "Finishing Time Corrections" advanced Siska into third place and she had set the Fastest Time. The first six yachts arrived within six days and Seltrust Endeavour was the last to finish, 18 days after the leader.

The Leg 2 start period was from 26 October to 1 November. A little more than halfway across a crewman on Seltrust Endeavour sustained suspected broken ribs when the yacht broached before a rogue wave. He was lifted off quite dramatically by a helicopter from the Australian naval supply ship HMAS Morseby, which was accompanying the fleet at the time. Then the Fremantle finish was very close. Both Siska and Gauloises 3 were making a southerly approach to Fremantle anticipating the favourable, over-night south-easters and daytime south-westerlies which generally prevail in November along the Western Australian coast. But an unseasonal north-east gale greeted them which, in turn, favoured Independent Endeavour, which was making a more northerly approach. Independent Endeavour finished in the evening of 21 November, a little less than three hours in front of Siska, and Gauloises 3 crossed the line early the following morning. This time the "Finishing Time Corrections" bumped Gauloises 3 up into second place and, once again, Siska had the Fastest Time. The first eight yachts finished in four days and the whole fleet in six.

And the Overall Results were the same as both legs; Independent Endeavour first, Gauloises 3 second and Siska third and fastest.

== Open Division ==
Sailing vessels with a minimum waterline length of 9.17 metres (30.1 ft) could enter. In anticipation of a wide variety of craft arrangements were made to have the yachts handicapped under the British Sail Training Association's measurement system used in "Tall Ships' Races". The race was run as a "Rally" and the "Prime Objective" was to arrive in Fremantle between 10:00 and 16:00 hours local time, on Sunday 25 November 1979. Yachts were free to nominate their own starting date from Plymouth within a prescribed period. They were then obliged to make a minimum 7-day stopover in Cape Town and a maximum 8-day stopover was allowed for time adjustment purposes. "Arrival" points were allocated in Fremantle depending on a yacht's finishing time and "Bonus" points were awarded for the condition of the boat and crew on arrival, position reporting and navigational records. It was anticipated only yachts finishing within the "Prime Objective" period would score sufficient points to win and, in the case of a tied points score, the Corrected Times would decide the order of placings. Yachts also had to finish by 12:00 hours on 30 November to be an "official" finisher.

The timings were determined as follows; Voyage Time (Plymouth-Fremantle) - Cape Town Stopover = Elapsed Time - Handicap = Corrected Time.

Yachts were also accepted with a two-person crew with self-steering, and there were handicap concessions for yachts choosing to sail without spinnakers.

Open Fleet in Handicap Order:

1. Bluebell (Western Australia), S&S 34 sloop, 10.24 metres, Max Shean, sailed without spinnakers
2. Mabena (England) Tufglass 33 sloop, 10.00 metres, Peter Morris
3. Shadow of Lothian (Scotland), one-off ketch, 10.06 metres, George Farquhar, two-person crew
4. Perie Banou (Western Australia), S&S 34 sloop, 10.24 metres, Jon Sanders - fitted with a taller than standard rig
5. Pegasus of Arne (England), Tufglass 38 sloop, 11.43 metres, Major Brian Daniels
6. Panasonic (Western Australia), one-off ketch, 10.87 metres, Bill Lowe
7. WAY 79 (Western Australia), one-off sloop, 10.67 metres, Richard Herring & Colin Reardon jointly.
8. Tahara'a (Western Australia), RORC 39 sloop, 11.89 metres, Ray Parker
9. Leschenault (Western Australia), one-off ketch, 12.19 metres, Bill Wales
10. Catalpa (Western Australia), Bowman 47 ketch, 14.27 metres, Tony Chandler
11. Bounty (Western Australia), Hallberg Rassey 41 ketch, 12.50 metres, Max Winkless
12. Success II (Western Australia), one-off ketch, 15.24 metres, Brian Kempthorne
13. Nike II (Czechoslovakia), one-off sloop, 13.40 metres, Richard Konkolski
14. Gypsy Moth V (England), one-off staysail ketch, 17.37 metres, Peter Hambly - Leg 1 & Giles Chichester Leg 2
15. Challenger (Western Australia), Curran 46 cutter, 13.87 metres, Dr. Jim Chute
16. Golden Lion (Italy), one-off cutter, 13.80 metres, Alex Carozzo Sunday Times Golden Globe Race
17. Wojewoda Pomorski (Poland), Conrad 54 cutter, 16.60 metres, Wiesiek Rakowski
18. Anitra II (France), Leopard 16 ketch, 16.90 metres, Dr Gilbert Malka

The fleet started between 4 August and 4 September and there were some dramas in Leg 1. Panasonic hit some flotsam in the English Channel and retired within 24 hours of starting. A rigging failure cost Catalpa her main mast in the South Atlantic and she put into Recife, Brazil, to fit a new mast, and then carried on. Both WAY 79 and Tahara'a had rudder problems in the South Atlantic. WAY 79 retired in St. Helena where she hitched a lift on a ferry to Cape Town and, after repairs, she rejoined the fleet for Leg 2. Tahara'a retired in Salvador, Brazil.

The remaining 15 yachts arrived in Cape Town between 08 and 29 October. Bluebell was first on Corrected Time, just 36 minutes better than Perie Banou. Challenger was third and Fastest.

Between 18 October and 7 November the yachts restarted. Four had stayed longer than eight days and Anitra II, the first to finish, stayed 15 days. Soon after departing Mabena returned to Cape Town and retired after encountering rough weather. Soon after Golden Lion reported she had been damaged in a storm south of Madagascar and she retired to Durban, Cape Town. There were a few more dramas as the leg progressed but the remainder of the fleet carried on.

Approaching Fremantle some of the yachts realised they were travelling too fast to make the 25 November "Prime Objective" and they slowed down.

Then 25 November started dramatically. Pre-dawn Anitra II ran aground on a reef off Mary Cove, on the south coast of Rottnest Island. The yacht was wrecked, and a write-off, but the crew made it to shore with only minor injuries. They were a little more than 13 nautical miles from the finishing line.

By 09:30 hours a massive spectator fleet was assembled off the entrance to Fremantle Harbour and tens of thousands of shore-based spectators lined the harbour's moles and wharves. Then the IOR entry Spirit of Ramfish IV emerged from the spectator fleet. Rob Kwekkeboom had realised they were not in the running for an IOR trophy and slowed down to join in the Open Division's "big finish". They crossed the line at 09:56 hours.

Pre-departure from Plymouth Jim Chute had made a vow to hit the line dead on 10:00 hours, and Challenger did just that. Perie Banou, Gypsy Moth V, Bounty and Bluebell followed over the next 12 minutes. The early IOR finishers then followed them into the harbour in a sail-past. It was a grand spectacle and the festivities carried on all day in Success Harbour, where the yachts berthed. Shadow of Lothian arrived the next day and Wojewoda Pomorski the day after, and there were only seven "official" finishers. Bluebell was the winner of Leg 2, Wojewoda Pomorski was second and Fastest, and Gypsy Moth V third.

The main challenge of the Open Division was voyage planning and getting the Plymouth departure date right. Whilst all of the 25 November finishers scored the maximum of 100 points, Max Shean proved to be the best planner. Bluebell virtually raced all the way and had the best Corrected Time to win the Overall trophy. Despite having to slow down in Leg 2 Perie Banou held onto second place and Gypsy Moth V was third. Wojewoda Pomorski was Fastest.

Five unofficial finishers and WAY 79 arrived in December and, in mid-March 1980, Tahara'a arrived home, almost one year to the day from when she had left Fremantle to sail to Plymouth.
