= S&S 34 =

Class of fibreglass monohull sailboat

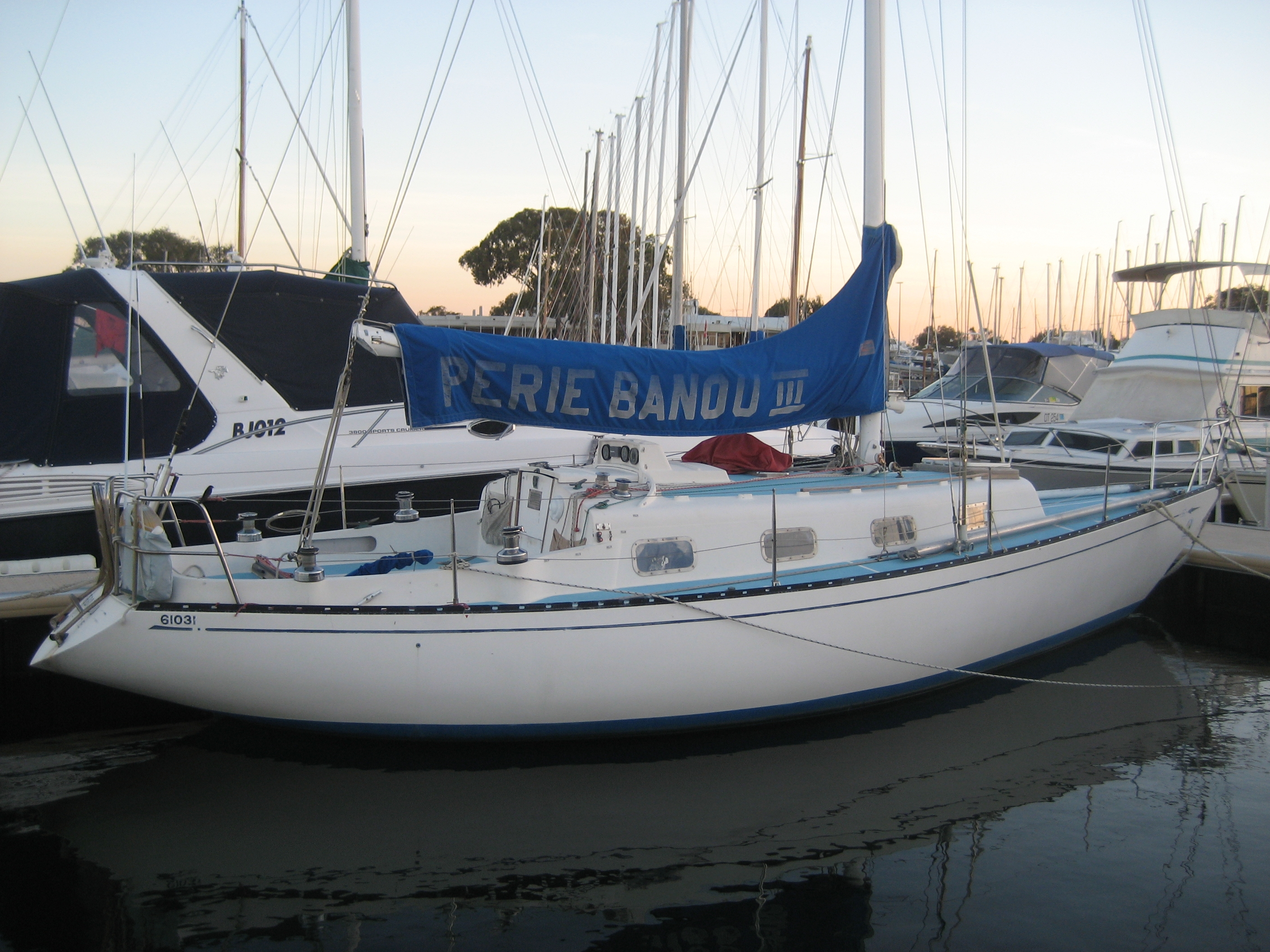
- Early 1980s S&S 34

Development
- Designer: Olin Stephens
- Year: 1968

Boat
- Crew: 1 to 6
- Draft: 1.78 metres (5 ft 10 in)

Hull
- Type: Monohull keelboat
- Construction: Fibreglass
- LOA: 10.08 metres (33.1 ft)
- LWL: 7.45 to 7.7 metres (24.4 to 25.3 ft)
- Beam: 3.08 metres (10.1 ft)

S&S 34 is a cruising and racing fibreglass monohull sailboat class. It was based on a design by Olin Stephens from Sparkman and Stephens after a commission from British yachtsman Michael Winfield.

The design features a skeg-hung rudder and a Bermuda rig with a large, overlapping headsail.

== Production history ==
The prototype was a 11 m (36 ft) wooden one-tonner which Winfield named Morningtown. From this Sparkman and Stephens were asked to develop a production design which became the S&S 34. The design was established as a new class in 1968 and quickly achieved great racing success.

Two sets of moulds were built, with Winfield building several boats before the first set were sold to UK boatbuilder Acquafibre. The second set went to Australia and changed hands several times before finally coming to Perth, Western Australia boatbuilder Swarbrick and Swarbrick.

About 200 boats have been built, approximately 50 in the United Kingdom and the remainder in Australia, and mainly by Swarbricks who continue to build S&S 34 boats to order from the original moulds. Since 2004 a new generation of boats have been built using advanced construction materials and techniques. These newer boats use foam-sandwich construction, vinylester resins and multiaxial glass. They are 25% lighter, as well as being much stronger and stiffer. In 2011, pre-1980 boats sell for between $15,000 and $22,000 and new Constellation class boats cost from about $200,000 fully rigged.

== Racing achievements ==
The first production S&S 34 built was Morning Cloud, owned by Sir Edward Heath. Heath had seen the boat at the 1969 London Boat Show and sailed it to win the 1969 Sydney to Hobart Yacht Race as well as a class win in the Fastnet Race off Cowes. S&S 34 designs were overall or prize winners in every Sydney to Hobart race from 1969 to 1974, they were placed 1st and 2nd in the 1979 Parmelia Yacht Race, and won the 1996 Lord Howe Island Race. Other notable racing successes were Deerstalker which won the 1989 North Sea Race, another Fastnet class win in 1991, and a win in the 1992 Round Britain and Ireland Race.

S&S 34s racing performance is similar to UFO 34s with both rated the same and slightly faster than a Contessa 32.

== Notable voyages ==
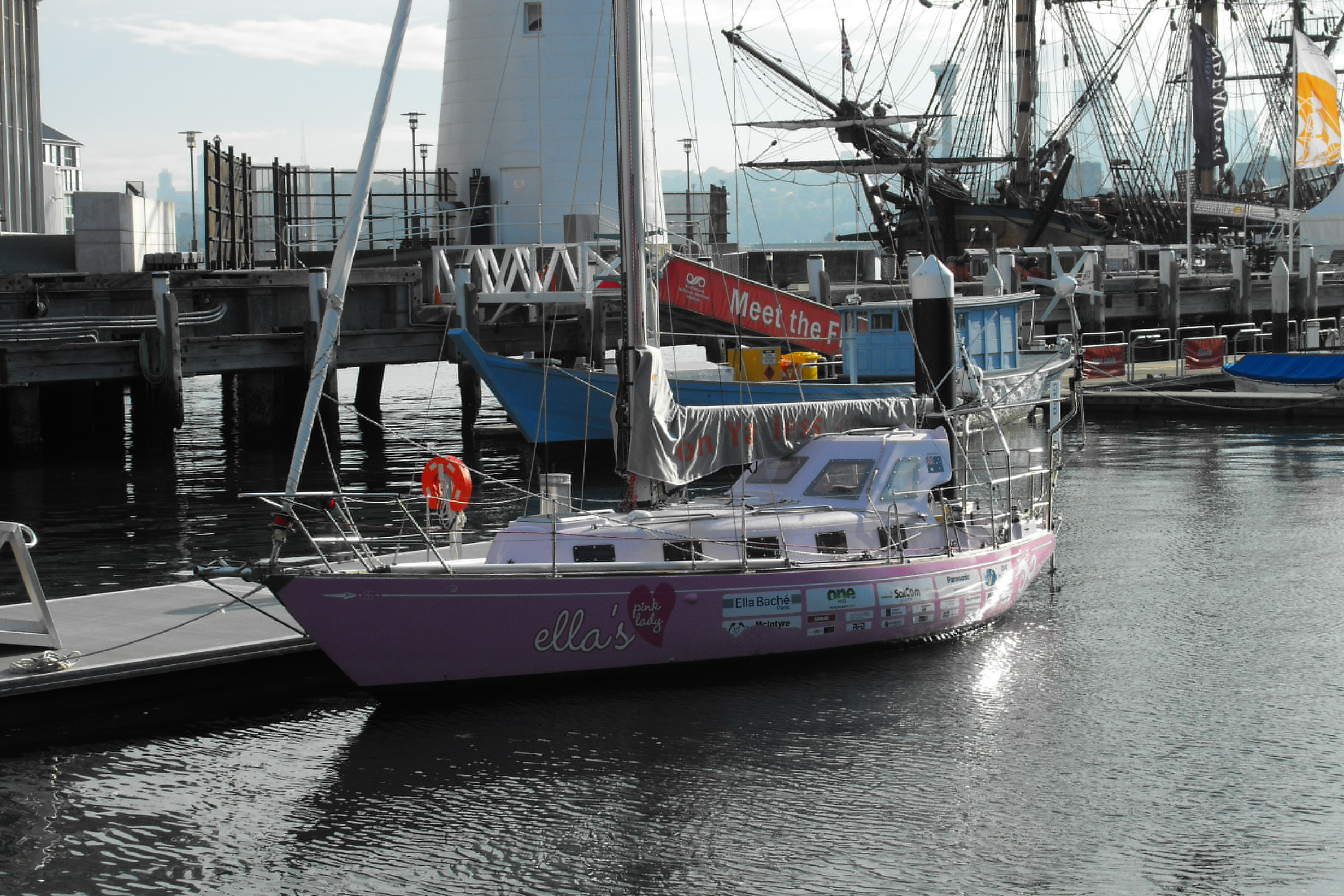
Jessica Watson's Ella's Pink Lady at the Australian National Maritime Museum, following the completion of her voyage

A proven cruising yacht which is well suited for short-handed sailing, the design is also notable for being used for several single-handed sailing circumnavigations: Jon Sanders in Perie Banou (1981–82), David Dicks in Seaflight (1996–97) and Jesse Martin in Lionheart (1998–1999). Sixteen-year-old Australian Jessica Watson completed a round the world trip in the S&S 34 Ella's Pink Lady on May 15, 2010. Dafydd Hughes began a circumnavigation attempt in ‘’Bendigedig’’ in August 2023 as part of the Global Solo Challenge.

Quadriplegic sailor Jamie Dunross completed a circumnavigation of Australia in his S&S 34 Spirit of Rockingham on 25 July 2010.

== See also ==
- List of sailing boat types

Similar sailboats

- Contessa 32
- Express 34
- Rustler 36
- Sea Sprite 34
- Tartan 34 C
- Tartan 34-2
- UFO 34 (yacht)
- Viking 34
