= Brian Caldwell =

American sailor

Brian 'BJ' Caldwell
- Born: December 17, 1975 (age 50)
- Occupation: Sailor
- Known for: Held the record as the youngest person to sail solo around the world (with stops and assistance); First person under the age of 21 to complete a solo circumnavigation

Brian 'BJ' Caldwell (born December 17, 1975) is an American sailor. He spent seven years cruising the South Pacific with his parents when he was young, returning to Hawaii at age 15. He departed Hawaii aged 19 and completed his voyage on September 28, 1996. He was the youngest solo circumnavigator, finishing at the age of 20, making him the first person under age 21 to circumnavigate. He has raced in France in the Mini Transat 6.50, Sydney to Hobart Yacht Race, Fastnet, Transpacific Yacht Race and other sailing races.

== Journey ==
Caldwell departed from Honolulu, Hawaii on June 1, 1995, traveling to Vanuatu, Cocos (Keeling), Mauritius, Durban, Cape Town, St. Helena, Grenada, Panama, and returning to Honolulu on September 28, 1996.

== See also ==
- List of youth solo sailing circumnavigations
