= Caper Cat =

Sailing catamaran

- Caper Cat Insignia

Development
- Location: Sandgate[Brisbane], Queensland, Australia
- Year: Circa 1970 -
- No. built: Unknown
- Brand: Calypso
- Builders: Calypso Sailcraft (Ross and Leslie Clarke)
- Role: Recreational sailing
- Name: Caper Cat

Boat
- Crew: 1–4 (6 adults max)
- Draft: 0.23 metres (9 in)
- Trapeze: Optional, can be added

Hull
- General: 2
- Type: Catamaran
- Construction: Fibreglass Hull, Alloy Mast
- Hull weight: 111.13 kg (245.0 lb)
- LOA: 4.3 m (14 ft)
- Beam: 2.29 m (7 ft 6 in)
- Engine: Optional Outboard Attachment (Max 5 H.P recommended)

Hull appendages
- Keel: n/a
- Rudder: "kick up" type fibreglass or alloy "squatter" shallow rudder

Rig
- Rig type: Bermuda
- Mast height: 6.71 m (22.0 ft)

Sails
- General: Sloop
- Mainsail area: 9.9 m^{2} (107 sq ft)
- Jib/genoa area: 3.3 m^{2} (36 sq ft)

The Caper Cat (or Caper Cat 14) is a 14 ft sailing catamaran manufactured by Calypso Sailcraft in Brisbane, Australia. While in many ways similar to other catamarans of its size (notably the Hobie Cat), a unique feature of the catamaran is its large storage capacity. Each hull contains large storage bins for camping and short island-to-island cruising trips.

In addition to the more common 14 ft version, 18 ft Caper Cats with extended storage capacity were also built, however few of these boats exist.

Although these boats are no longer in production, there are a large number still being sailed, especially around South East QLD. Ross and Leslie Clarke from Calypso (the manufacturer) it appears retired in circa 2012-2013 and handed over responsibility to LR Sails in Deception Bay QLD. http://www.lrsails.com.au/ who reportedly retain various spare parts (castings etc) and the patterns for both sails and trampolines.

There is an active Facebook forum dedicated to Calypso Sail Craft. There is also an active sub-forum on catsailor.net specifically dedicated to Caper Cat & Calypso Sailcraft
