= Percy Ellin =

Australian rules footballer

Personal information
- Full name: Percy Ellin
- Born: 21 June 1884; Bentleigh, Victoria
- Died: 14 December 1959 (aged 75); Mentone, Victoria
- Original team: East Brighton
- Position: Fullback

Playing career^{1}
Years	Club	Games (Goals)
1905–10	St Kilda	70 (19)
1910	Richmond	1 (0)
Total		71 (19)
- ^{1} Playing statistics correct to the end of 1910.

Percy Ellin (21 June 1884 – 14 December 1959) was an Australian rules footballer who played with St Kilda and Richmond in the Victorian Football League (VFL).
