= Ella Baché =

French skin care brand

- Company type: Private
- Industry: Cosmetics
- Founded: 1936; 90 years ago
- Founder: Ella Baché
- Headquarters: Paris, France
- Area served: Worldwide
- Number of employees: over 200
- Website: www.ellabache.com

ELLA BACHÉ is a French skin care brand created in Paris by pharmacist Madame Ella Baché in 1936.
