= Abby Ershow =

American nutritionist

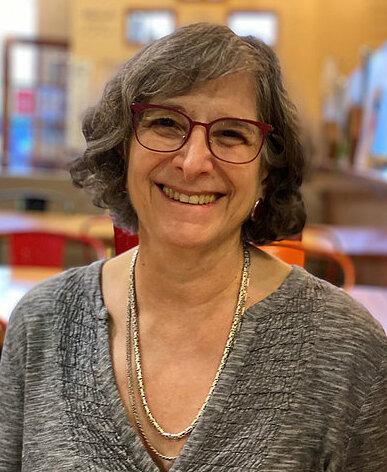
- Ershow in 2022
- Education: Cornell University; Harvard T.H. Chan School of Public Health
- Scientific career
- Fields: Iodine nutrition, lipid metabolism, atherogenesis
- Workplaces: National Institutes of Health

Abby Gwen Ershow is an American nutritionist specialized in iodine nutrition, lipid metabolism, atherogenesis, and cardiovascular nutrition. She was a health science administrator at the National Heart, Lung, and Blood Institute from 1982 to 1989 and a senior nutrition scientist at the National Institutes of Health Office of Dietary Supplements from 2014 to 2021.

== Life ==
Ershow completed a B.A. degree in biological sciences (physiology) from Cornell University in 1973. She earned a Sc.D. degree in nutrition, physiology and biostatistics from Harvard T.H. Chan School of Public Health in 1979. Her dissertation was titled, Dietary effects of plasma lipoproteins and lecithin: cholesterol acyltransferase in the rhesus monkey (Macaca mulatta). She is a registered dietitian.

Ershow was a staff fellow in the Epidemiology and Biostatistics Program of the National Cancer Institute from 1982 to 1989, where she worked on projects in China and Japan. From 1989 to 2014, Ershow worked at the National Heart, Lung, and Blood Institute (NHLBI) where she managed an extramural portfolio in lipid metabolism, atherogenesis, and cardiovascular nutrition. At NHLBI, Ershow set up the Dietary Effects on Lipoproteins and Thrombogenic Activity (DELTA) multicenter diet intervention trial and developed the plan for the National Food and Nutrient Analysis Program, an interagency food composition project involving USDA, NHLBI and other NIH institutes along with many other federal partners. In 2007, she was elected a fellow of the American Heart Association and also completed a detail assignment as a visiting analyst at the Government Accountability Office.

From 2014 to December 2021, she was a senior nutrition scientist in the National Institutes of Health (NIH) Office of Dietary Supplements (ODS) where she led its iodine initiative to strengthen research on and develop data resources for studies of iodine nutrition. Ershow was particularly involved with interagency collaborations with the U.S. Department of Agriculture and the Food and Drug Administration to develop databases of the iodine content of foods and dietary supplements. She also participated in an analysis of National Health and Nutrition Examination Survey program data to determine the proportion of U.S. pregnant women advised by their physicians to take supplements containing iodine, which underscored concerns about whether iodine intake is adequate in this population. After retiring in December 2021, Ershow contributes to ODS projects as a consultant.

Ershow is a volunteer Maryland master naturalist docent.
