= Abby Winterberger =

American freestyle skier (born 2010)

Personal information
- Born: May 1, 2010 (age 16) Truckee, California, U.S.

Sport
- Country: United States
- Sport: Freestyle skiing
- Event: Halfpipe
- Club: Olympic Valley Freestyle Freeride Team

Abby Winterberger (born May 1, 2010) is an American freestyle skier specializing in halfpipe. She represented the United States at the 2026 Winter Olympics, where she was the youngest member of the US Olympic team.

== Career ==
Winterberger grew up in Truckee, California. She initially focused on gymnastics, also joining a ski team at age six to compete in moguls and half pipe. In 2020, during the COVID-19 pandemic, Winterberger began to focus primarily on skiing.

Winterberger won the 2023 US Open Class Nationals in half pipe, then won both half pipe and slopestyle the following year. Winterberger made her World Cup debut during the 2025-26 season, finishing seventh overall in the half pipe standings.

In 2026, Winterberger was selected for the Winter Olympics based on her strong World Cup results. She bypassed the typical pipeline for the Olympic team, as she was still a club-level athlete and not part of the US national snowboard team. At 15 years old, she is also the youngest athlete on the US roster for the 2026 Olympic Games, and the second youngest ever Olympic selection in freestyle skiing for the US after Maggie Voisin in 2014.

== Personal life ==
Winterberger's parents are Jim and Rosemary. Her older brother Mack is also a competitive freestyle skier.
