= Abbie K. Mason =

- Born: September 1861; New York, United States
- Died: August 7, 1908 (aged 46); United States
- Other names: Abbie Mason
- Spouse: James Edward Mason (married 1888)
- Children: 1

Abbie K. Mason (September 1861 – August 7, 1908) was a Black American suffragist. She was known as the president of the Woman's Christian Temperance Union (WCTU) and taught the lessons of Frederick Douglass at the Memorial African Methodist Episcopal Zion Church of Rochester, New York.

== Biography ==
Abbie K. Mason was born September 1861 in New York. In 1888, she married Reverend James Edward Mason. He served as a pastor at the oldest African-American church in Rochester, New York, at Memorial African Methodist Episcopal Zion Church (also known as Memorial AME Zion Church or Zion Church). Together they had four children, however only one child named Kittie survived into childhood.

Douglass had used the church basement to publish his anti-slavery weekly, The North Star, as well as using it for a stop on the Underground Railroad. Frederick Douglass died on February 20, 1895, and Rev. James Edward Mason and Rev. Wesley A. Ely of Memorial African Methodist Episcopal Zion Church participated in the last rites.

In August 1901, Abbie K. Mason founded and was president of the Woman's Christian Temperance Union, their chapter had nine women and most had already been connected to the Memorial African Methodist Episcopal Zion Church. The meetings for the club were held in the church basement, and focused on learning about Frederick Douglass.

Susan B. Anthony, a friend of Douglass, gave her last public speech in 1906 at Memorial African Methodist Episcopal Zion Church.

Abbie K. Mason died on August 7, 1908.
