= Abbie Newell =

Canadian ice hockey player

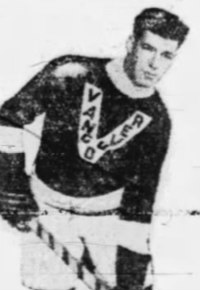
- Newell with the Vancouver Maroons
- Born: June 12, 1897 Winnipeg, Manitoba, Canada
- Died: May 5, 1967 (aged 69) Orange County, California, USA
- Height: 5 ft 7 in (170 cm)
- Weight: 158 lb (72 kg; 11 st 4 lb)
- Position: Defence
- Shot: Left
- Played for: Saskatoon Crescents; Vancouver Maroons; Edmonton Eskimos; Regina Capitals
- Playing career: 1916–1928

Albert Victor Newell (June 12, 1897 – May 5, 1967) was a Canadian professional ice hockey player. He played with the Saskatoon Crescents, Edmonton Eskimos, and Regina Capitals of the Western Canada Hockey League. He also played for the Vancouver Maroons of the Pacific Coast Hockey Association. He died in California in 1967.
