= Aby King =

British novelist (born 1977)

Abigail "Aby" King is a British novelist best known as the author of the Adventures of a Royal Dog fantasy series. The first book in the series, Lupo & The Secret of Windsor Castle, was released on 4 September 2014, published by Hodder Children's Books. There are currently four books in the series, which is based on the Welsh royal cocker spaniel, Lupo.

== Biography ==
Aby King was born in London. She was raised in Wimbledon Village with her brother Oliver. She came up with the idea for the Lupo series whilst walking her dog Lilly around Kensington Palace.

She is a PA, but always wanted to write a children's series for her own kids. At school she was inspired by Enid Blyton's The Magic Faraway Tree and scribbled fantasy and adventure stories.

In 1991, when King was 14, her mother died of leukemia. The following year, her half-sister, the model and actress Louise Ashby, was seriously injured in a car crash in Los Angeles. The story of her long and painful recovery is told in her 2001 book The Magic of the Mask.

King supports a number of charitable organisations including the NSPCC, Cruse Bereavement and the Mayhew Animal Home.

== Books ==
=== The Adventures of a Royal Dog ===
1. Lupo and the Secret of Windsor Castle (2014)
2. Lupo and the Curse at Buckingham Palace (2015)
3. Lupo and the Thief at the Tower of London
4. Lupo and the Labyrinth of the Lost Pirate of Kensington Palace (2016)
