= Mindwave (video game) =

Upcoming video game

- Key thumbnail
- Developer: HoloHammer
- Director: Megalo224
- Designer: Isabelle "Milkshake" Beardsworth
- Programmers: Michael "Mook" Herndon; Isabelle "Milkshake" Beardsworth
- Artists: Megalo224; nyrusine; quak; EtudeF0rGh0sts
- Writers: Starmy; Carlos "Mizu" Galindo
- Composer: Dorkus64
- Engine: GameMaker
- Platform: Windows
- Genre: Action
- Mode: Single-player

Mindwave (stylized in all caps) is an upcoming action game developed by American indie developer HoloHammer. It is a fast-paced minigame collection inspired by Nintendo's WarioWare series, taking place in the Mindscape Tower, where the protagonist Pandora aims to win a cash prize contest involving entering other contestants' minds and playing microgames.

A demo was released on Steam in January 2025 alongside a crowdfunding campaign on Kickstarter, receiving positive reception.

== Gameplay ==
A microgame featuring the first opponent, Abbie, in which her kisses act as obstacles towards the player

In Mindwave, the player plays as Pandora, a young girl who enters the Mindscape Tower after winning a Platinum Ticket to enter the titular "cognitive reality" game show alongside numerous other contestants. The game's aim is to continuously win against other contestants, advancing in the tower until reaching the top floor and receiving a cash prize.

The core gameplay of Mindwave is inspired by the WarioWare games; the player plays several short and fast-paced minigames known as "microgames", each with short commands that the player must fulfill. The speed of the microgames gradually increases as the player progresses, with alternate variations of prior microgames being introduced. Since Mindwave is a PC game, all of the microgames use either keyboard, mouse, or arrow key inputs.

Between rounds, the player can talk to non-playable contestants to engage in branching conversations and learn about their backstories.

== Development and release ==
In January 2025, developer HoloHammer released a demo of the game, alongside a campaign on Kickstarter to raise funds for the full game, as part of the Steam Next Fest. The campaign lasted from January 14 to February 14, 2025, and ultimately raised US$443,442, surpassing its goal of US$40,000.

With many of the Kickstarter campaign's stretch goals being met, there are plans for multiple additional features including gamepad support, an additional microgame collection accessible after completing the main story, Steam Workshop support, downloadable content, and an online versus mode, the latter of which is to be added post-launch.

Kaan Serin reported for GamesRadar+ in February 2025 that HoloHammer estimated that Mindwave may release in September 2027, but added that the date is subject to change. A development update posted on Kickstarter on December 28 revealed a new game over screen and song; Justin Wagner, writing for PC Gamer, praised the new song and described it as "the sort of dance-worthy defeat screen that salves the sting of losing in a frenzied arcade game".

== Reception ==
During the Kickstarter campaign, Mindwave's demo received positive reception from critics and journalists. Nic Reuben from Rock Paper Shotgun described the game as addictive, calling it "quite difficult to escape." Dwayne Jenkins from Vice compared it to Psychonauts (2005), stating that Mindwave "made [him] feel today what [he] felt when [he] played Psychonauts all those years ago," and that it "perfectly understood [him] as a human being." Oli Welsh from Polygon called the presentation "anarchic" and wrote, "Mindwave is neither as obsessively minimalist nor as random as WarioWare, but that's OK [sic]. HoloHammer is doing something else instead, something pretty exciting; it's taking WarioWare's splintered vision of gaming and building it back up into something whole."
