= Deborah's Place =

Chicago nonprofit organization for the homeless

Deborah’s Place
- Formation: 1985
- Type: Non-profit
- Legal status: 501(c)(3)
- Region served: Chicago
- Revenue: (2017)
- Website: www.deborahsplace.org

Deborah's Place, established in 1985, is a Chicago-based nonprofit organization that offers shelter, resources and support to the homeless women of Chicago. Its mission is to provide resources to homeless women in order for them to transition from being homeless. Programs and services include permanent supportive housing and basic necessities. Deborah's Place has worked with over 4,000 women, delivering employment training, access to education, healthcare, case management, permanent, interim and subsidized community-based housing. One-third of participants are recovering from drug abuse and mental illness.

== Establishment ==
The founders named the organization "Deborah's Place" after an Old Testament story about a judge named Deborah, who raised an army of 10,000 soldiers to free oppressed people. They received assistance from the Immaculate Conception Church in Chicago in order to host their first overnight emergency women's shelter in the church's gymnasium. Funding began through the religious groups, community groups and private contributions. They networked with LaSalle Street Church, The First United Methodist Church, Holy Name Cathedral, St. James Cathedral and Fourth Presbyterian.

Possible establishment locations have been rejected such as the one proposed by Reverend Pastor Joe Morin of St. Alphonsus in 2007, for a Deborah's Place shelter location to be placed on his church property, but lost in the South Lakeview Neighbors Association meeting due to "disgruntled residents". Deborah's Place has also faced disgruntled residents in possible establishment in Wicker Park.

Kathy Booton Wilson is the fourth and current CEO of Deborah's Place, and has worked for the organization for over 30 years.

== History ==
With help from the Community Emergency Shelter Organization (CESO), Deborah's Place was able to create an its first overnight shelter for women on the North side of Chicago. The organization's first overnight shelter was opened in 1985 in a church gymnasium at the location of 1404 North Sedgwick Ave., Chicago, Illinois. The staff included three people with 25 volunteers and a budget of $69,000. By 1987 the organization was granted 501(c)(3) non-profit status. In 1998, Womancraft Inc, a for-profit program was launched, which employed participants of Deborah's Place to make jewelry and paper decorations to help raise funds for the organization. By 2004, the switch to providing long-term stability occurred and the organization opened its first daytime shelter in Bucktown, Chicago, along with a transitional housing program with the purpose of helping homeless women find housing and income.

In March 2025, Deborah's Place celebrated 40 years of helping homeless women and was highlighted in Chicago media during Women's History Month.

== Philosophy ==
Locations in Garfield Park and Old Town offer Permanent Supportive Housing to women who've experienced homelessness. Based on the philosophy of Housing First, the organization strives to meet women where they are, with the goal that once a woman comes to Deborah's Place she will never be homeless again. This includes the evidence-based practice of Harm Reduction, which provides resources to reduce the risks of engaging in dangerous behavior such as drug use rather than enforcing sobriety as a condition of maintaining housing. Supportive community is also key to the organization's philosophy of healing from the trauma of homelessness.

== Housing programs and services ==
Deborah's Place offers interim and permanent housing that are all linked to supportive services at four locations throughout Chicago. Housing is for transitional purposes, which provides supportive services to become self-sufficient. Locations on the West and North Side of Chicago include supportive services such as: crisis intervention, counseling, health care assistance, job training, education, daytime learning centers, transitional housing, 129 supported living apartments and 90 rental studio apartments. Housing is only offered to individuals who identify as female or non-binary.

Irene's was a housing program that provided job counseling, showers, laundry, art therapy, phones and lunches to its participants. It started in 1985 and closed in 2005. Another form of housing offered is The Overnight Shelter, which offers food, showers and a Learning Center between the hours of 5pm-8am, with the length of stay being unlimited. The Safe Haven offers shelter up to 15 homeless women, whom suffer from severe mental illness and/or have been chronically homeless. In 1988, Marah's Transitional Housing Program began and offers up to 22 women two years of a semi-structured environment with private rooms. In return the participants participate in communal meals and assist the program.

In 1995, The Chicago Foundation for Women supported program within the Eleanor Network, Teresa's Transitional Shelter was opened and provided ten women housing and programs up to four months with dormitory-style living spaces. Participants who stayed in the housing had to help with community chores and cooking. Another housing option offered is Deborah's Place II Apartments with permanent supportive housing where tenants sign lease and pay up to 30 percent of their income as rent, as well as services such as case management, support groups, employment help, art therapy and educational resources. Redeveloped in 2000, Rebecca Johnson Apartments also offer permanent housing were the tenants pay 30 percent of their salary as rent for one of the 90 studio apartments offered with services such that include work out facilities, staff offices, case management, support groups, art therapy and The Learning Center.

The Learning Center Provides humanities studies including US History, Art History, Literature, music and film studies. Other resources also include libraries, computers and individual tutoring along with Internet access.The Savings Incentive Program (SIP) is a resource provided by Teresa's Transitional Shelter, which teaches budgeting skills to residents.Jesseca Rhymes an active volunteer for Deborah's Place has been organizing a feminine hygiene collection drive to donate to Deborah's Place since 2015.

== Awards and acknowledgements ==
Deborah's Place Open Door fundraiser/award ceremony

Deborah's Place holds an annual fundraiser/award ceremony called Open Doors where people donate money to the organization by betting on raffles or general charity. Deborah Place volunteers and employees are given awards as well. On June 10, 2012, Deborah's Place held a fundraiser/award presentation where they raised over $100,000. Award recipients included Linda Palm, who received the Founders Award, and the Sammons Financial Group, who received the Philanthropic Partner Group.

Illinois Dimension of Quality Award

Awarded in 2011 for their work in holistic service.

Sara Lee Foundation Chicago Spirit Award

In May 2000, Deborah's Place received the Sara Lee Foundation Chicago Spirit Award, which was a $100,000 award for their impact on homelessness.

1 in 4

Deborah's Place is a part of the 1 in 4 Initiative, which is a national effort organization whose goal is to end homelessness. The 1 in 4 Initiative is a national effort built on regional partnerships and established by The American Roundtable to Abolish Homelessness (ART).

== Coordinated Entry System ==
Deborah's Place receives referrals with the help of the Coordinated Entry System that helps connect the homeless with the proper necessities.Kathy Booton Wilson, Chief Executive Officer, advocates for the Coordinated Entry System.
