= Abie =

Disambiguation page

Abie is a diminutive of the name Abraham (including the Hebrew Avraham). It may refer to:

== People ==
- Abie Grossfeld (born 1934), American Olympic gymnast and coach
- Abie Nathan (1927–2008), Israeli humanitarian and peace activist
- Abie Rotenberg, Orthodox Jewish musician
- Cal Abrams (1924–1997), nicknamed "Abie", American Major League Baseball player

== Places ==
- Abie, Nebraska, a village in Butler County, Nebraska, US

== Arts and entertainment ==
- Abie's Irish Rose, a 1922 Broadway play
  - Abie's Irish Rose (1928 film), a film directed by Victor Fleming
  - Abie's Irish Rose (1946 film), a film directed by A. Edward Sutherland

== See also ==
- Aby (name)
