= OceansWatch =

- OceansWatch Logo
- Abbreviation: OW
- Formation: 2008-04-17
- Type: NGO
- Legal status: New Zealand Charitable Trust, USA 501c3 (EIN: 26-3407022)
- Purpose: Healthy Oceans and Sustainable Island Communities
- Headquarters: Whangarei, New Zealand
- Location: Worldwide
- Region served: Papua New Guinea, Solomon Islands, Vanuatu, Caribbean
- Members: Open to the public
- Official language: English
- Leader: Chris Bone
- Affiliations: Reef Check
- Website: http://www.oceanswatch.org/

OceansWatch is an international not-for-profit NGO that works with sailors, divers and scientists worldwide to help coastal communities conserve their marine environments, develop sustainable livelihoods and ensure access to primary schools. OceansWatch was established in 2007. The organization was registered as a New Zealand Charitable Trust on April 17, 2008 and was awarded 501(c)(3) non-profit status in the USA in 2010.

== Services ==
Yacht owning members of OceansWatch benefit by being hosts to other volunteers and projects. A documentary covering the "2008 Pacific Trip" by Animotion coined the phrase "Cruising With a Cause". Members garner a sense of fulfillment while visiting rural communities that may otherwise be socially inaccessible. OceansWatch and its members carry out expedition projects in the Pacific and the Atlantic that focus on environmental and humanitarian issues in rural coastal communities. OceansWatch focuses on promoting sustainable livelihood & education as opposed to offering philanthropic aid in the form of financial contributions. Communities are encouraged and empowered to learn about the resources available to them and to use and care for those resources in a sustainable fashion. The three distinct areas of focus: education, humanitarianism, and environmental, are interdependent: Providing education on how to protect an environmental resource will improve the quality of life for a rural community.

== Finances ==
As an international organization OceansWatch is made up of distinct entities taking on legal forms appropriate for the respective region. The nature of the legal forms in each region enforces financial transparency by requiring annual filings. OceansWatch Pacific's 2014 tax filing shows a gross income of $138,638 NZD; the bulk of that coming from "Donations / koha" ($66,430NZD). According to tax records OceansWatch started receiving grants and sponsorship in 2011, three years after initially registering as a charitable trust. In 2014 the organization received $38,584NZD from grants and sponsorships.

== Membership ==
Members and volunteers are what allow OceansWatch to operate with limited financial backing. The organizational portion of the group coordinates projects with people and resources to accomplish a set of goals in a specific region. As of December, 2009 there are about 290 members from many different parts of the world. Each member pays an annual membership fee of US$25. Members gain access to a Drupal based portal with forums and receive invitations to participate in projects.

== Projects ==
In 2008 and 2009 the organization had projects in Vanuatu, the Solomon Islands and Papua New Guinea. Plans for 2010 include return trips to those countries and project expansion to other developing countries in the Pacific, Asia, Central America and the Caribbean. During 2014 the organization plans on following up with previously setup MPAs, expanding the Reef Guardian program to incorporate the islands of LomLom and Vanikoro, and instituting the first Junior Reef Guardian Program which will be implemented at High schools. In conjunction with Living Oceans Foundation, OceansWatch plans to get baseline assessments by conducting habitat mapping and taking high resolution satellite photos.

== Impact and findings ==
=== 2013 ===
In 2013 OceansWatch "revisited the communities of Tuwo, Malubu, Malapu and Mola, and visited new communities, Buma, Kala Bay, Otelo and Ngadeli."
