= Abby Sage =

Canadian musician

Abby Sage is a folk pop musician from Toronto, Canada.

== History ==
Sage released her debut EP, Fears of Yours & Mine, in 2021, to positive reviews. Two years later, in October 2023, she released a song from what was to be her debut album, The Rot, which she announced in January 2024 and was subsequently released on March 1 through Nettwerk Music Group. The album received positive reviews.

== Discography ==
Studio Albums

- The Rot (2024, Nettwerk)
- Fears of Yours & Mine (2021)
