= Abby Ellin =

American author and journalist

- Born: 1968 (age 57–58); Brookline, Massachusetts
- Education: Ithaca College; Emerson College; Johns Hopkins University
- Occupations: Journalist, author
- Writing career
- Language: English
- Notable works: Duped: Double Lives, False Identities, and the Con Man I Almost Married
- Website: abbyellin.com

Abby Ellin (born 1968) is an American author and journalist. The author of two books, including Duped: Double Lives, False Identities, and the Con Man I Almost Married, she writes regularly for The New York Times, and has contributed to Time, Newsweek, and The Daily Beast, among other publications.

Ellin grew up in Brookline, Massachusetts, and attended Brookline High School. She holds a BS in communications from Ithaca College, an MFA in creative writing from Emerson College, and a master's degree in international public policy from Johns Hopkins University.

Ellin's first book, Teenage Waistland: A Former Fat Kid Weighs In on Living Large, Losing Weight, and How Parents Can (and Can't) Help, published in 2007, documents her own experience as an overweight teenager, and examines the psychological, medical, and cultural impact of obesity on adolescents. Duped: Double Lives, False Identities, and the Con Man I Almost Married was published in January 2019. Based on her relationship with a man she identifies as The Commander, an ex–Navy Seal who falsely claimed to be the high-level CIA operative mastermind, the book "turns her heartache into a riveting memoir that's also an insightful investigation into the nature of emotional con artists." The book expanded on "The Drama of Deception," a cover story Ellin wrote for Psychology Today in 2015.

== Bibliography ==
- TEENAGE WAISTLAND: A Former Fat Kid Weighs In on Living Large, Losing Weight, and How Parents Can (and Can't) Help, PublicAffairs, 2007, ISBN 1586482289
- DUPED: Double Lives, False Identities, and the Con Man I Almost Married, PublicAffairs/Hachette, 2019, ISBN 9781610398015
