= Abby Sunderland =

American sailor (born 1993)

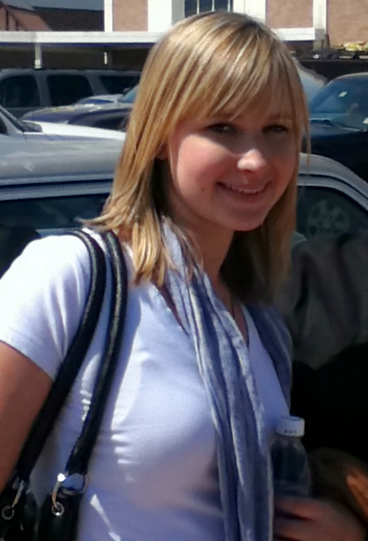
- Abby Sunderland at the Houston Boat Show in Kemah, Texas, U.S. on April 14, 2011
- Born: Abigail Jillian Sunderland; October 19, 1993 (age 33); Los Angeles, California, U.S.
- Education: Trinity Pacific Christian School
- Known for: Attempting to become the youngest person to sail around the world solo; Youngest solo sailor to round Cape Horn
- Parents: Laurence Sunderland (father); Marianne Sunderland (mother)

Abigail Jillian Sunderland (born October 19, 1993) is an American sailor who, in 2010, attempted to become the youngest person to sail solo around the world.

== Early life ==
The second-eldest of Marianne and Laurence Sunderland's eight children, Sunderland grew up sailing with her family. Her brother, Zac Sunderland, was the first person under the age of 18 to complete a circumnavigation. Her family is Christian. She and her siblings have been homeschooled.

== 2010 circumnavigation attempt ==
Wild Eyes
History

United States
- Operator: Abby Sunderland
- Route: Cabo San Lucas – Cape Horn – Cape of Good Hope – Indian Ocean
- Builder: A.S.A. Yachts PTY, Australia
- Completed: 2001
- Acquired: October 24, 2009; 17 years ago
- Out of service: June 12, 2010; 16 years ago
- Status: Dismasted, abandoned in southern Indian Ocean (12 June 2010); Sighted at Kangaroo Island, South Australia (31 December 2018)

General characteristics
- Type: Sloop
- Tonnage: 16 (gross), 15 (net)
- Displacement: 7407 lbs (3360 kg)
- Length: 40 ft (12 m)
- Beam: 11.21 ft (3.42 m)
- Installed power: Yanmar (18 hp)
- Propulsion: Sails
- Sail plan: Bermuda (Marconi) rig
- Notes: Formerly BTC Velocity

A lifelong sailor, Sunderland said she had been preparing for her journey since age 13. Her father Laurence Sunderland said he understood her determination when "It was a particularly rough day and her boat was rocking from gunnel to gunnel. ... I knew she was freezing cold, tired and hungry, and we'd been at it for, you know, 20 hours at that stage. I said, 'So Abby, are you ready to sail around the world now?' To which she replied, 'Where is my boat?'" Her parents were widely criticized for the decision to allow her to undertake this trip, with one critic calling the decision "potentially irresponsible."

The planned sail route was to begin from Marina del Rey, thence to Cape Horn, Cape of Good Hope, Cape Leeuwin and back to Marina del Rey in ten legs, solo and unassisted, following definitions set by the International Sailing Federation World Sailing Speed Record Council (WSSRC), according to which the equator must be crossed.

Sail-World noted of Sunderland's departure timing: "While ... she will round the Horn in the height of summer when conditions should be the best they can be, her delayed departure ... means that by the time she sails south of Australia, the weather will be approaching autumn, and the weather will be deteriorating.". After her rescue, the trip was criticized by sailors as "badly planned" and "foolhardy."

Sunderland's yacht Wild Eyes was a 40-foot (12.19 m) sloop built in 2001 by A.S.A. Yachts PTY, Australia. Designed by Jutson Yacht, it was purported to be made specifically for sailing single-handed through the Southern Ocean, but post-rescue reporting disputed this. Under its earlier name BTC Velocity the vessel finished second in the Class 3 (Open 40) category of the Around Alone 2002 race. Wild Eyes was constructed of fiberglass with Kevlar reinforcement into five watertight compartments with a crash bulkhead and a stern escape hatch. It was bought in Rhode Island by the Sunderland family in October 2009 and refitted in Marina Del Rey, California, with an array of electrical, communication and navigation systems.

=== First attempt ===
Sunderland started her solo circumnavigation from Marina del Rey, California, on January 23, 2010. There had not been enough time to do a multi-day test sail in varying conditions, so the team decided to let her depart anyway, and stop in Cabo San Lucas, Mexico, if needed. After a few days it became evident that her solar panels and wind turbines were not meeting the energy needs of her boat in the conditions she met, so using the diesel engine was needed more than anticipated. There were also electrical problems in her mast wiring, which affected her windspeed indicators. Sunderland landed at Cabo San Lucas on February 2, 2010, to take on more fuel and batteries, make repairs and restart her non-stop circumnavigation attempt.

=== Second attempt ===
Sunderland started her second attempt from Cabo San Lucas on February 6, 2010, intending to complete a solo, non-stop, unassisted circumnavigation in ten legs, departing from and returning to Cabo San Lucas. On February 19, 2010, at 3:07 PM PST, thirteen days after departing Cabo San Lucas, Sunderland and Wild Eyes crossed the equator into the South Pacific at 0°N 120.25°W.

On February 27, 2010, there was media concern for Sunderland's safety because of the 2010 Chile earthquake. She was then at 15°S 123°W, some 1,860 miles (2,990 km) from the quake's epicenter, but the great ocean depth at her location minimized the effect of the resulting tsunami and her team reported she had not "... experienced anything out of the ordinary."

On March 21, 2010, while sleeping at approximately 2:00 AM local time, she suffered a knockdown and barely avoided an accidental jibe. On March 31, 2010, Sunderland rounded Cape Horn—the southernmost point of South America—making her the youngest solo sailor to do so. She experienced rough seas and heavy winds when approaching, but little wind the last day before Cape Horn.

On April 24, 2010, Sunderland announced that she would stop at Cape Town for repairs to her autopilot system, ending her non-stop attempt. However, she planned to continue the circumnavigation. Sunderland had two separate autopilot systems and both failed. She was able to swap parts between them to keep one going for a time, but a leak made the repair stop necessary. She arrived in Cape Town on May 5, 2010.

Sunderland departed from Cape Town on Friday, May 21, 2010, defying the superstition against starting a sailing voyage on a Friday, and saying, "I will stop again if I need to." By this time, it became likely her arrival in Cabo San Lucas or direct to Marina del Rey would be in August or possibly September.

Around May 24, 2010, a line got stuck near the top of her mast. Sunderland tried to climb the mast but found it too dangerous in the near gale conditions and full darkness, so she sailed throughout that night under reduced sails.

=== Dismasting and rescue in the Indian Ocean ===
VOA's Carolyn Presutti examines reactions to the precocity of Abby Sunderland's circumnavigation attempt.

On the morning of June 10, 2010, Sunderland was sailing in high winds and had suffered multiple knockdowns in a remote area of the Indian Ocean northeast of the Kerguelen Islands, about 2,000 miles (3,200 km) west of Australia. Satellite phone contact was lost and about an hour later Sunderland's two manually operated emergency radio beacons were activated. A third beacon which triggers automatically if it goes 15 feet (4.6 m) underwater was not activated. The nearest known ship was about 400 miles (640 km) away from her electronically reported position. Her beacon position at the time was published as 40°48′S 74°58′E, approximately 2,033 nautical miles (3,765 km; 2,340 mi) west-south-west of Perth.

Abby's life was saved by a NASA-developed Personal Locator Beacon (PLB), which transmitted a distress signal to a Search and Rescue (SARSAT) satellite in orbit. On October 25, 2010, Abby visited NASA's Goddard Space Flight Center to meet the team that developed this technology more than 30 years ago.

The next morning, the Australian Maritime Safety Authority sent a chartered Qantas Airbus A330 passenger jet to the area with 11 trained SES air observers and a FESA officer on board. The search plane faced a 4,700 miles (7,600 km) round trip from Perth to Sunderland's boat, a distance near the limit of its range. The boat was sighted about 10 minutes after the plane reached its search zone. Brief, short-range radio contact was made with Sunderland, who said she had righted the boat and was uninjured. Despite earlier fears that her sailing yacht had lost its keel and capsized, the boat was upright but dismasted, its rig dragging in the ocean from the broken mast, making satellite phone reception impossible. Sunderland's mother said the pilot of the Australian search plane told her the boat had probably been "rolled by a rogue wave." Her father said his daughter's circumnavigation attempt had come to an end.

Sunderland's route from January–June 2010

The area where Sunderland's yacht was adrift is rarely visited by merchant ships or other sea traffic. The Australian Maritime Safety Authority's Rescue Coordination Centre put together a sea response with three ships traveling to the scene. Sunderland was rescued by the French commercial fishing vessel Ile de la Réunion late in the afternoon on June 12, 2010. Air cover for the rescue was handled from a privately owned Global Express corporate jet, which also relayed communications between her and the fishing vessel before its crew launched a small boat to ferry her from the crippled sailing yacht. In a statement the Australian Maritime Safety Authority said "The master of the Ile De La Réunion has reported Ms. Sunderland is safe and in good health." During her rescue, which took place in rough seas, the captain of the French fishing boat fell into the water and had to be "fished out in difficult conditions."

In Thousand Oaks, California, Laurence Sunderland told reporters "She got out of her vessel with the clothes on her back." Aboard the Ile de la Réunion Sunderland wrote that "one long wave" had brought about the dismasting of her sail boat Wild Eyes, which was abandoned to the ocean.

The Ile de la Reunion took Sunderland to the Kerguelen Islands where she boarded a French patrol boat, the Osiris, for an 8-day trip to Reunion Island.

==== Cost of rescue ====
Australian and French taxpayers bore some of the expenses for Sunderland's rescue and the Australian government confirmed that by law, she or her family cannot be billed for the expenses. It has been reported the Qantas plane used to spot her costs A$10,000 an hour to operate. The total cost of the international rescue is estimated by media to be up to £116,000 (A$200,000) or A$300,000 depending on source. There has been criticism of her team's lack of contribution to rescue costs. The Daily Telegraph said "failed teen solo sailor Abby Sunderland's team did not put a cent towards her rescue but still tried to get the public to pay for the boat's salvage." According to the International Convention for the Safety of Life at Sea, any ship of any nation in the vicinity of a distress call is required to render assistance at no cost. In France, a law has been proposed that tourists could be required to reimburse the state for rescue costs if they "ventured knowingly and without 'legitimate motive' into risky territory".

After her rescue, Sunderland said she hoped to sail around the world again some time in the future.

=== Reality television show deal ===
After Sunderland's rescue the New York Post reported that after she set sail from Marina del Rey on her circumnavigation attempt, her father signed a deal with Magnetic Entertainment for a television show about his family called Adventures in Sunderland and quoted him as saying: "The show might be about family, it might be about Abigail's trip. It's something that was shopped around." On her blog, the family later wrote, "The show was shopped and not sold [...] There is no reality TV show or documentary in the works and we will not be pursuing one."

=== Documentary ===
Sunderland was the subject of a documentary film produced and directed by her father titled Wild Eyes: The Abby Sunderland Story. The film was released on September 8, 2011.

=== Book ===
Sunderland released a book about her ordeal on April 12, 2011. The book is co-written with Lynn Vincent and is titled Unsinkable: A Young Woman's Courageous Battle on the High Seas. She has been going on book-signing tours, where it was revealed that she is taking flying lessons, to be able to fly around the world.

=== Wild Eyes rediscovered ===
In 2018 an overturned vessel spotted off the coast of Kangaroo Island was identified as Wild Eyes. News pictures appear to show it as having lost its keel. An Australian official said that it will not be salvaged unless it poses a hazard to shipping or comes ashore.

== Personal life ==
In 2018 Sunderland was living in Alabama, is married with three children, with one on the way.

== See also ==
- Circumnavigation
- List of youth solo sailing circumnavigations
