= World Sailing Speed Record Council =

Sailing record keeping organization

- Formation: 1972
- Website: http://www.sailspeedrecords.com/

The World Sailing Speed Record Council (WSSRC) was founded in 1972, initially to ratify records at the inaugural Weymouth Speed Week held every year since in Portland Harbor.The WSSRC is the body authorized by the World Sailing (formerly International Sailing Federation, International Yacht Racing Union) to confirm speed records of sailing craft (boats, windsurfers and kitesurfers) on water (not on ice or land). In the early years the council only dealt with claims of speed records on a one-way leg of 500 metres. Since 1988 the WSSRC is also responsible for offshore sailing records, because there were several controversial claims about the times of long voyages. The first records recorded in 1972 were the Outright record of Sir Timothy Colman, Crossbow, 26.30 knots (D class); Icarus 21.6 knots (B class); Mayfly 16.40 knots and Lief Wagner Smitt, windsurfer 13.6 knots.

One or more meetings were held every year and since 2001 the council has had a permanent secretariat. Members of the expert council from Australia, France, Great Britain and the U.S. assess record claims. Record holders and their times are listed. WSSRC also issues Performance Certificates to sailors who wish to be officially timed over accepted courses without breaking records.

== See also ==
- Speed sailing record
- Passage sailing record
- Transatlantic sailing record
- Around the world sailing record
