= Gale (surname) =

Gale is a surname. Notable people with the surname include:

- Andrew Gale (born 1983), British cricketer
- Anthony Gale (died 1843), fourth commandant of the United States Marine Corps
- Benjamin Gale (1715–1790), American physician, scientist, agriculturist, inventor and political polemicist
- Bob Gale (born 1951), motion picture screenwriter
- Bob Gale (cricketer) (1933–2018), English cricketer
- Brendon Gale (born 1968), Australian rules footballer
- Colin Gale (1932–2008), Welsh footballer
- David Gale (1921–2008), mathematician
- David Gale (actor) (1936–1991), British actor
- Ed Gale (1963–2025), American actor and stunt performer
- Eddie Gale (1941–2020), American trumpeter
- Eddra Gale (1921–2001), American actress and singer
- Eric Gale (1938–1994), American jazz and session guitarist
- Ernest Gale (1914–2005), British microbiologist
- Fay Gale (1932–2008), Australian cultural geographer and professor
- Frederick Gale (1823–1904), English cricket writer and cricketer
- George Gale (disambiguation)
- Gladys Gale (1891–1948), American nightclub singer, vaudeville performer, and character actress
- Grant O. Gale (1903–1998), physics professor
- Hannah Gale (1876–1970), Canadian politician
- Henry Gale (astrophysicist) (1874–1942), American astrophysicist and author
- Henry Gale (British Army officer) (1883–1944), British Army officer
- Humfrey Gale (1890–1971), British Army lieutenant general
- Iain Gale (born 1959), British author
- John Gale (disambiguation)
- Joseph Gale (1807–1881), American pioneer
- Joseph H. Gale (born 1953), American judge
- Karen Gale (1948–2014), American neuroscientist
- Kate Gale (born 1965), American poet, librettist, and independent publisher
- Kelly Gale (born 1995), Australian Swedish Indian model
- Laddie Gale (1917–1996), American basketball player
- Levin Gale (1784–1834), American politician
- Lorena Gale (1958–2009), Canadian actress
- Margaret Gale (1930–2025), British operatic soprano
- Mariah Gale (born 1980), British-Australian actress
- Maura Gale, American voice actress
- Megan Gale (born 1975), Australian model
- Melvyn Gale (born 1952), cellist for the Electric Light Orchestra
- Michael Gale (footballer) (born 1966), former Australian rules football player
- Michael Denis Gale (1943–2009), British plant geneticist
- Mitchell Gale (born 1990), American football player
- Nathan Gale (1979–2004), American murderer
- Norman Gale (1862–1942), poet
- Parnell Gale (died 1818), Mayor of Galway in 1817
- Patrick Gale (born 1962), British author
- Philip Gale, computer prodigy
- Philip A. Gale, British scientist
- Richard Gale (disambiguation)
- Robert Gale (disambiguation)
- Roger Gale (born 1943), English politician
- Shaun Gale (born 1969), English former footballer
- Shirley Gale (1915–2008), American botanist, botanical illustrator, and conservationist
- Sylvia Gale (1950– 2020), American activist and politician
- Terry Gale (born 1946), Australian golfer
- Theophilus Gale (1628–1678), English theologian
- Thierry Gale (born 2002), Barbadian footballer
- Thomas Gale (disambiguation)
- Tom Gale (disambiguation)
- Tony Gale (born 1959), English football player and coach
- Tristan Gale (born 1980), American athlete
- Vi Gale (1917–2007), Swedish-born American poet and publisher
- Walter Frederick Gale (1865–1945), Australian banker and astronomer
- William Gale (disambiguation)
- Zona Gale (1874–1938), American writer

== Fictional characters ==
- Cathy Gale, in the TV series The Avengers
- David Gale, from the video games Shin Megami Tensei: Digital Devil Saga
- Dorothy Gale, in the early 1900s L. Frank Baum Oz series and movies
- Uncle Henry (The Oz Books), Dorothy Gale's uncle
- Henry Gale (Ben Linus), in the television series Lost

== See also ==
- Gale (given name)
- Gail (disambiguation)
- Gayle (disambiguation)
- Gale (disambiguation)
