= Gayl =

Gayl is a given name and a surname. Notable people with the name include:

- Gayl Jones (born 1949), African-American writer
- Gayl King (born 1963), Canadian darts player
- Wilhelm von Gayl (1879–1945), German politician
- Georg Freiherr von Gayl (1850–1927), German general

== See also ==
- Gael (disambiguation)
- Gayle (disambiguation)
- Gale (disambiguation)
- Gail (disambiguation)
