= Gales =

Gales can refer to:

== Places ==
- Wales, a country that is part of the United Kingdom, called "Gales" in Spanish, Portuguese, Catalan, Galician, Occitan, and Basque
- Galeş, a village in Săliște town, Sibiu County, Romania
- Gales Addition, Washington, U.S.
- Gales Creek (disambiguation)
- Gales Ferry, Connecticut, U.S.
- Gales Point, Belize
- Gales Township, Redwood County, Minnesota, U.S.

== People ==
- Dion Gales (born 1985), American footballer
- Eric Gales (born 1974), American blues rock guitarist
- Henry Gales (1834–1897), English painter
- Joseph Gales Sr. (1761–1841), American journalist
  - Joseph Gales (1786–1860), American journalist and his son
- Jules Gales (1924–1988), Luxembourgish footballer
- Kenny Gales (born 1972), American footballer
- Larry Gales (1936–1995), American jazz double-bassist
- Pete Gales (born 1959), Canadian football player
- Seaton Gales (1828–1878), American editor
- Simon Gales (born 1964), British contemporary artist
- Winifred Gales (1761–1839), American novelist

== Other ==
- Gales Brewery
- Gale's, a brand of honey and lemon curd in the United Kingdom
- Gales, a meteorological event

== See also ==
- Gale (disambiguation)
- Galesburg (disambiguation)
- Galesville (disambiguation)
- Gaels, Gaelic people
- Gail's, British bakery and café chain
