= Abigail (name) =

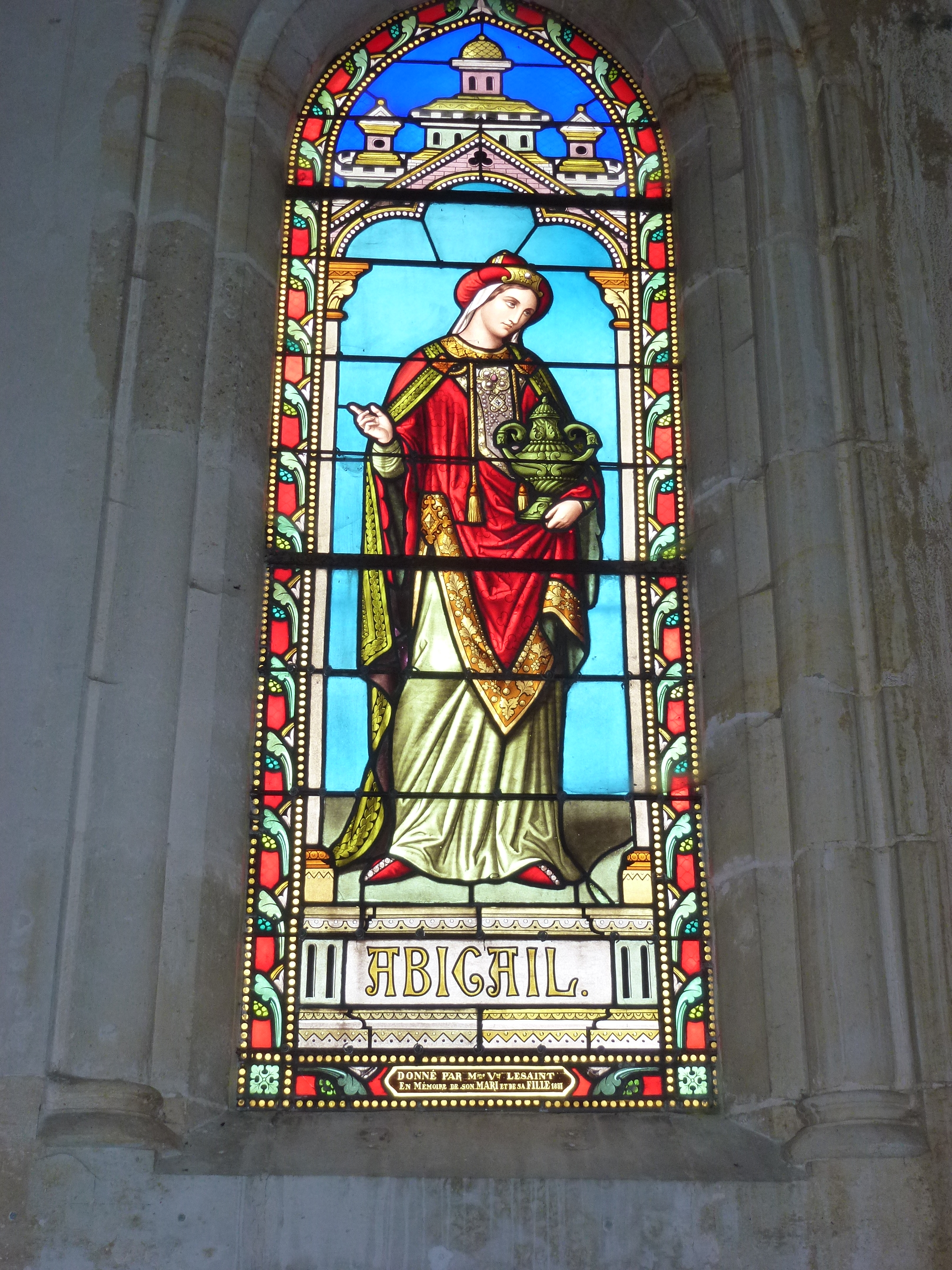
- Abigail in a stained glass window in the Church of Notre-Dame de Neuvizy
- Pronunciation: /ˈæbɪɡeɪl/ AB-i-gayl
- Gender: Female
- Language: Hebrew language

Origin
- Meaning: My father's joy

Other names
- See also: Abby or Abbie, Abbey, Abi, Gail, Gayle, Gale

Abigail is a feminine given name. The name comes from the Biblical Hebrew: אֲבִיגַיִל / אֲבִיגָיִל ʾĂḇīḡayīl, meaning "my father's joy" (alternatively "my father is exulted" or "my father is joyful", among others). It is also a surname.

The name can be shortened to Abbey, Abby, Abbie, Abbi, Abi, or Aby, as well as Gail and Gayle, among others.

== Translations ==
- Arabic: ابيجايل "Abigail" (Egypt), ابيغيل "Abighail" (other Arab countries)
- Assyrian Neo-Aramaic: ܐܲܒ݂ܝܼܓ݂ܸܠ "(ʾaḇīḡil / Awigil)"
- Bengali: এবিগেল (Ēbigēla)
- Biblical Greek: Abigaia
- Biblical Hebrew: אביגיל
- Bulgarian: Абигейл
- Catalan: Abigail
- Cantonese: 阿比基爾 (aa^{3} bei^{5} gei^{1} ji^{5})
- Chinese Simplified: 阿比盖尔 (Ā bǐ gài ěr)
- Chinese Traditional: 艾比蓋兒
- Czech: Abigel
- Danish: Abigail, Abigael
- Dutch: Abigail,
- Ethiopian: Abigiya, አቢግያ
- Fijian: Apikali
- French: Abigaïl, Abigaël
- German: Abigail
- Greek: Άμπιγκεϊλ (Ámpigkeïl)
- Gujarati: એબીગેઇલ (Ēbīgē'ila)
- Haitian Creole: Abigayèl
- Hawaiian: Apikalia, ʻApikaʻila
- Hebrew: אביגיל, Avigail / Abigail, אֲבִיגָיִל (ʾĂḇîḡáyil)
- Hindi: अबीगैल
- Hungarian: Abigél
- Indonesian: Abigail
- Irish: Abigeál
- Italian: Abigaille
- Japanese: アビゲイル (Abigeiru)
- Korean: 애비게일 (Aebigeil)
- Macedonian: Авигеја (Avigeja)
- Maori: Apikaira
- Mongolian: Ивээл (ᠢᠪᠡᠭᠡᠯ)
- Nepali: अबीगेलले (Abīgēlalē)
- Persian: آبیگل - ابیگیل - ابیگل
- Polish: Abigeil
- Portuguese: Abigail
- Punjabi: ਅਬੀਗੈਲ (Abīgaila)
- Romanian: Abigaela
- Russian: Эбиге́йл (Ebigeil) or Авиге́я (Avigeya); the latter used exclusively in biblical contexts
- Serbian: Абигејл (Abigejl) but in biblical context Ависага (Avisaga) is used
- Somali: Abiigayil
- Spanish: Abigaíl
- Swahili: Abigaeli
- Swedish: Abigail
- Turkish: Abigail, Avigayil
- Ukrainian: Абіґейл (Abigeil)
- Urdu: ابیگیل
- Yiddish: אַביגאַיל
- Yoruba: Ábígẹlì

== People ==
- Abigail Adams née Smith (1744–1818), First Lady of the United States to president John Adams
- Abigail Abbot Bailey (1746–1815), American memoirist
- Abigail Bauleke (born 2001), American wheelchair basketball player
- Abigail Binay (born 1975), Filipina politician
- Abigail Breslin (born 1996), American actress
- Abigail Byskata (born 2007), Finnish ice hockey player
- Abigail Camilleri, Maltese politician
- Abi Carter (born 2002), American singer and musician
- Abbey Clancy (born 1986), English model
- Abigail Conceição de Souza (1921–2007), Brazilian footballer
- Abbie Cornish (born 1982), Australian actress
- Abigail Cowen (born 1998), American actress
- Abigail Cruttenden (born 1969), English television actress
- Abby Dahlkemper (born 1993), American soccer player
- Abigail Fillmore (1798–1853), First Lady of the United States, wife of President Millard Fillmore
- Abigail Folger (1943–1969), American heiress and murder victim
- Abigail Glen (born 2001), English cricketer
- Abigail and Brittany Hensel (born 1990), American conjoined twins
- Abigail Franks (c. 1696–1756), Colonial-era New York City Jewish letter writer
- Abigael González Valencia (born 1972), Mexican suspected drug lord
- Abigail Griffin, American politician
- Abbey Hsu (born 2001), American basketball player
- Abigail Campbell Kawānanakoa (1882–1945), Hawaiian princess
- Abigail Kapiolani Kawānanakoa (1903–1961), Hawaiian princess
- Abigail Kinoiki Kekaulike Kawānanakoa (1926–2022), Hawaiian princess
- Abby Lee Miller (born 1965), American dance instructor
- Abigail Maheha (1832–1861), Hawaiian princess
- Abigail Masham, Baroness Masham (c.1670–1734), British baroness
- Abi Morgan (born 1968), Welsh playwright and screenwriter
- Abigail Morris (arts administrator) (born 1964), British arts administrator
- Abigail Morris (singer) (born 1999), British singer-songwriter
- Abigail Paduch (born 2000), Australian judoka
- Abigail Rogan (born 1946), aka Abigail (actress), Australian actress
- Abigail Rogers, (1818–1869) American advocate for women's rights and women's education
- Abigail Rooney, American politician
- Abigail Seldin (born 1988), American edtech entrepreneur
- Abigail Adams Smith (1765–1813), first-born child of John Adams, the former President of the United States
- Abigail Willis Tenney Smith (1809–1885), missionary to the Sandwich Islands; teacher
- Abigail Spanberger (born 1979), American politician
- Abigail Spears (born 1981), American tennis player
- Abigail Spencer (born 1981), American actress
- Abigail Swann, American atmospheric scientist and ecologist
- Abigael Tarus (born 1981), Kenyan volleyball player
- Abigail Tere-Apisah (born 1992), Papua New Guinean tennis player
- Abigail Thorn (born 1993), British actress and YouTuber
- Abi Titmuss (born 1976), British actress
- Abigail Van Buren, pen name of Pauline Philips, pseudonymous author of the Dear Abby column
- Abigail Goodrich Whittelsey (1788–1858), American educator, publisher, editor
- Abigail Williams (1680–c.1697), a primary accuser in the Salem witch trials; portrayed in the Arthur Miller play The Crucible

== Biblical figures ==
- Abigail is the wife of King David in the Hebrew Bible's Book of Samuel, and is described as an intelligent, beautiful, loyal woman.
- Abigail is the mother of Amasa, the commander-in-chief of Absalom's army (2 Samuel 17:25).

== Fictional characters ==
- Mother Abagail, the personification of good in Stephen King's novel The Stand
- Abbey Bartlet, the First Lady of the United States in the television drama The West Wing
- Abigail Brand, Special Agent, commanding officer of S.W.O.R.D., that deals with defending the Earth from extraterrestrial threats
- Abi Branning, in the BBC soap opera EastEnders
- Abigail Brown, a character in the Diary of a Wimpy Kid book series
- Abigail Callaghan, a Big Hero 6 character
- Abigail Deveraux, student in the NBC soap opera Days of Our Lives
- Abby Holland, DC Comics character
- Abigail "Abby" Jensen, in the 2010 film 16 Wishes
- Abigail Lincoln, aka Numbuh 5 in the animated series Codename: Kids Next Door
- Abby Lockhart, medical doctor in the television drama ER
- Abby Maitland, zoologist in the British television series Primeval
- Abigail Roberts, the name of John Marston's wife in Red Dead Redemption and Red Dead Redemption 2
- Abigail Scanlan, one of the main protagonists in the ABC Family film, Revenge of the Bridesmaids, played by Raven-Symoné
- Abby Sciuto, forensic scientist in the television drama NCIS
- Abigail Stock, a supporting character in the British television series Skins
- Abigail Williams, character in the CBS soap opera As the World Turns

== People with the surname ==
- Francis Abigail (1840–1921), Australian politician
- Peter Abigail (born 1948), Australian army officer
- Robert Abigail (born 1980), Dutch DJ

== See also ==
- Gilla (disambiguation)
- Avigayil, an Israeli settlement
