= Gail (given name) =

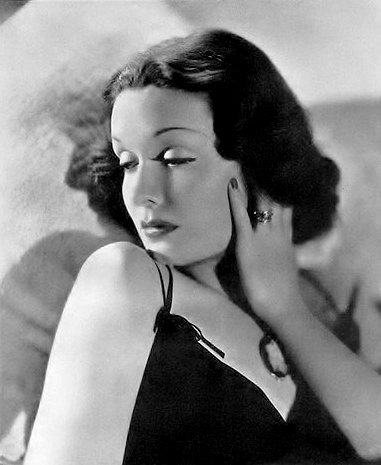
Publicity photo of Gail Patrick for Argentinian Magazine

Gail is a masculine and feminine given name. As a feminine name, it can be a short form of the name Abigail.

Gail has been used as a masculine and feminine name, and until the 1930s, was equally common on both sexes. Between the 1930s and 1960s, its use as a feminine name increased, as a consequence marginalizing masculine usage by about 1960.

Alternate spellings include Gaile, Gale, and Gayle.

Notable people with the given name include:

== People ==
- Gail Beggs, Canadian government minister
- Gail Boggs (born 1951), American actress
- Gail Borden (1801–1874), American inventor
- Gail Borden (figure skater) (1907–1991), American figure skater
- Gail Brodsky (born 1991), American tennis player
- Gail Bruce (1923–1998), American football player
- Gail Collins (born 1945), American journalist
- Gail Cronauer (born 1948), American actress
- Gail Davies, (born 1948), American country singer/songwriter
- Gail Devers (born 1966), American athlete
- Gail Ann Dorsey (born 1962), American musician
- Gail Emms (born 1977), British badminton player
- Gail Finney (1959–2022), American businesswoman and politician
- Gail Fisher (1935–2000), American actress
- Gail Goodrich (born 1943), American basketball player
- Gail Grandchamp (born 1955), American boxer
- Gail Halvorsen (1920–2022), American air force pilot
- Gail Jonson (born 1965), New Zealand swimmer
- Gail Kim (born 1976), Canadian wrestler
- Gail Carson Levine (born 1947), American writer
- Gail Nkoane Mabalane (born 1984), South African actress and model
- Gail Miller (water polo) (born 1976), Australian water polo player
- Gail Minault (born 1939), American historian
- Gail Novinger (1929–2019), American politician from Missouri
- Gail O'Grady (born 1963), American actress
- Gail Phillips (1944–2021), American politician
- Gail Porter (born 1971), British television presenter
- Gail Ryan (born 1939), American hairstylist
- Gail Sanborn, American politician
- Gail Shapiro (1947–2006), American pediatric allergist
- Gail Sheehy (1936–2020), American writer
- Gail Simmons (born 1976), Canadian food critic
- Gail Simone (born 1974), American comics writer
- Gail Skare (born 1939), American politician
- Gail Tipa (born 1959), New Zealand resource management planner

== Fictional characters ==
- Gail Leery, character in the television series Dawson's Creek
- Gail Platt, character in the television series Coronation Street
- Gail Wynand, character in the 1943 novel The Fountainhead by Ayn Rand

== See also ==
- Gaël (given name)
- Gale (given name)
- Gayle (given name)
