= Gaille =

People with the name Gaille include:

== Given name ==
- Gaille Heidemann, American voice actress and musician

== Surname ==
- Patrice Gaille (born 1956), Swiss fencer
- Philippe Gaille (born 1951), Swiss gymnast
- Scott Gaille (born 1969), American lawyer, petroleum executive, and academic

== See also ==
- Gail (disambiguation)
- Gaile (disambiguation)
- Galle (disambiguation)
