= Gayle =

Gayle or Gayl may refer to:

== People ==
- Gayle (given name), people with the given name
- Gayle (surname), people with the surname
- Gayle (singer) (born 2004), American singer-songwriter

== Places ==
- Gayle, North Yorkshire, England
- Gayle, Jamaica, a village
- Gayle Mill, South Carolina, United States

== Other uses ==
- Gayle language, a South African argot
- Gayle, a system controller chip in the Amiga 600 and 1200 computers

== See also ==
- Gayl (disambiguation)
- Gayles (disambiguation)
- Gael (disambiguation)
- Gail (disambiguation)
- Gale (disambiguation)
