= Gaile =

People with the name Gaile include:

== Given name ==
- Gaile Foote, American musician; wife and bandmate of Carson Parks
- Gaile Gillaspie, member of Rare Silk
- Gaile Lok (born 1980), Hong Kong actress and model

== Surname ==
- Ieva Gaile (born 1997), Latvian figure skater
- Iluta Gaile (born 1968), Latvian luger, businesswoman, and politician
- Inga Gaile (born 1976), Latvian poet, novelist, and playwright
- Jeri Gaile (born 1957), American actress
- Kristīne Gaile (born 1997), Latvian figure skater
- Rena Gaile, Canadian musician

== See also ==
- Gail (disambiguation)
- Gailes (disambiguation)
- Gaille (disambiguation)
