= Gales Creek =

Gales Creek may refer to:

- Gales Creek (North Carolina), a stream in the U.S. state of North Carolina
- Gales Creek, North Carolina, a community named for the North Carolina stream
- Gales Creek (Oregon), the tributary of the Tualatin River
- Gales Creek, Oregon, a community in the U.S. state of Oregon
