= Gaël (given name) =

Gaël (feminine Gaëlle) is a Breton given name. Its etymology is uncertain, it may be related to the ethnonym Gael (Goidel); alternatively, it may be a variant of the name Gwenhael (name of a 6th-century Breton saint).

While the popularity of the masculine name Gaël has been consistently at about rank 100 in France during the 2000s, the feminine name was at rank 100 in 2000 but has declined in popularity since, dropping below rank 400 by 2010. The masculine name Gael in the United States rose steeply in popularity during the 2000s; below rank 1,000 before 2002, it rose to rank 146 in 2012.

Gael also sees some use as a feminine given name in the United States, as a variant of Gail and Gayle (short form of Abigail).

== People called Gaël (Gael) ==
Men:

- Gael Acosta (b. 1992), Mexican footballer
- Gael Álvarez (b. 2006), Mexican footballer
- Gaël Angoula (b. 1982), French footballer
- Gael Bonilla (b. 2003), Mexican basketball player
- Gaël Clichy (b. 1985), French footballer
- Gaël Da Silva (1984–2026), French gymnast
- Gaël Danic (b. 1981), French footballer
- Gaël Etock (b. 1993), Belgian footballer
- Gaël Faye (b. 1982), Rwandan–French singer
- Gaël Fickou (b. 1994), French rugby player
- Gael García Bernal (b. 1978), Mexican actor and producer
- Gaël Germany (b. 1983), French footballer
- Gaël Givet (b. 1981), French footballer
- Gaël Kakuta (born 1991), footballer
- Gaël Leforestier (b. 1975), French television host
- Gael Margulies (b. 1994), Israeli footballer
- Gaël Monfils (b. 1986), French tennis player
- Gaël Monthurel (b. 1966), French handball player
- Gaël Morel (b. 1972), French film director
- Gaël N'Lundulu (b. 1992), French footballer
- Gaël Ondoua (b. 1995), Cameroonian footballer
- Gaël Pencreach (b. 1977), French runner
- Gaël Querin (b. 1987), French decathlete
- Gael Rakotondrabe (b. 1984), French pianist
- Gael Sandoval (b. 1995), Mexican footballer
- Gaël Tallec (b. 1976), French rugby player
- Gaël Touya (b. 1973), French fencer
- Gaël Yanno (b. 1961), French politician representing New Caledonia

Women:

- Gael Baudino (b. 1955, pen name), American fantasy author
- Gael Jean Campbell-Young (b. 1973), South African-born plant taxonomist and actor
- Gael Greene (1933–2022), American restaurant critic and author
- Gael Mackie (b. 1988), Canadian artistic gymnast
- Gael Martin (b. 1956), Australian athlete
- Gael Murphy (year of birth unknown), American anti-war activist

== People called Gaëlle (Gaelle) ==
- Anne-Gaëlle Sidot (b. 1979), French tennis player
- Eva Gaëlle Green (b. 1980), French actress
- Gaëlle Méchaly (b. 1970), French soprano
- Gaelle Adisson (b. 1974), American house/soul singer and songwriter
- Gaëlle Thalmann (b. 1986), Swiss footballer
- Gaëlle Valcke (b. 1986), Belgian field hockey player
- Gaelle Mys (b. 1991), Belgian gymnast
- Gaëlle Enganamouit (b. 1992), Cameroonian footballer
- Gaëlle Barlet (b. 1988), French mountain bike orienteering competitor (champion 2011)

== See also ==
- Gail (given name)
- Gale (given name)
