= American Academy of Allergy, Asthma, and Immunology =

- Abbreviation: AAAAI
- Formation: 1943
- Legal status: Active
- Headquarters: Milwaukee, Wisconsin
- Region served: United States
- Members: 7,000
- President: David A. Khan
- Website: www.aaaai.org

Founded in 1943, the American Academy of Allergy, Asthma & Immunology (AAAAI) is a professional medical membership organization of more than 7,000 allergists/immunologists and related professionals around the world with advanced training and experience in allergy, asthma and other immunologic diseases. The Academy is dedicated to the advancement of the knowledge and practice of allergy, asthma and immunology for optimal patient care.

Most members of the AAAAI are board-certified allergist/immunologists. A select group of the membership are elected as Fellows and carry the title FAAAAI.

The organization, headquartered in Milwaukee, Wisconsin, hosts a website for patients and healthcare professionals that includes a physician referral directory for patients.

== Mission ==
The AAAAI is dedicated to the advancement of the knowledge and practice of allergy, asthma, and immunology for optimal patient care.

== History ==
The American Academy of Allergy, Asthma, and Immunology (AAAAI) dates back to the 1920s through the founding of two professional organizations: The Society for the Study of Asthma and Allied Conditions, and the American Association for the Study of Allergy. In 1943, the two organizations united to create the American Academy of Allergy (AAA). From 1982 to about 1991 it was called the American Academy of Allergy and Immunology (AAAI). Since then it has been called the American Academy of Allergy, Asthma, and Immunology (AAAAI).

== Publications ==
The AAAAI publishes three official academic journals.

The Journal of Allergy and Clinical Immunology (JACI), published monthly, is the official scientific journal of the AAAAI. It is the most-cited journal in the field of allergy and clinical immunology.

In January, 2013, the AAAAI launched The Journal of Allergy and Clinical Immunology: In Practice, a publication aimed at the practicing clinician treating allergies, asthma and immunologic disorders.

The AAAAI also publishes The Journal of Allergy and Clinical Immunology: Global.

The organization also publishes educational materials for patients and consumers.

== National Allergy Bureau ==
The National Allergy Bureau (NAB) is an AAAAI-certified pollen and outdoor mold spore counting network. The NAB issues pollen and mold reports three times a week and provides information on common seasonal outdoor allergy triggers. The NAB is part of the AAAAI's Aeroallergen Network, and consists of pollen and spore counting stations staffed primarily by AAAAI member volunteers. They provide pollen and mold counts from approximately 80 counting stations throughout the United States, two counting stations in Canada, and two in Argentina.

== Annual meeting ==
Each year, academic and clinical leaders attend the AAAAI Annual Meeting, which showcases new research and discuss other developments in the areas of allergy, asthma and immunology. The meeting is attended by more than 7,000 allergist/immunologists, related physicians, allied health professionals and industry representatives.

== Past presidents ==
- Gail G. Shapiro (2001)
- Thomas Platts-Mills (2006)
