= Gayles =

Gayles may refer to:

== Places ==
- Gayles, North Yorkshire, a village in England
- Gayles, Virginia, an unincorporated community in King George County, Virginia, United States

== People ==
- Billy Gayles (born 1931), American rhythm & blues drummer and vocalist
- Caesar Felton Gayles (born 1900), American football and basketball coach
- Darrin P. Gayles (born 1966), American judge
- Fred Gayles (born 1966), American former arena football wide receiver/linebacker in the Arena Football League
- George W. Gayles (born 1844), African-American Baptist minister and politician holding offices in Mississippi
- Joseph Gayles (born 1844), American criminal, one of the leaders of the Patsy Conroy Gang in New York City

== See also ==
- Gayle (disambiguation)
- Gaylesville, Alabama
