= Grayle =

Grayle is a surname. Notable people with the surname include:

- Gardner Grayle, fictional character
- John Grayle (1614–1654), English Puritan minister

== See also ==
- Gayle (surname)
