= Gale (given name) =

- Pronunciation: /ˈɡeɪl/ GAYL
- Gender: masculine

Origin
- Origin: from Gale (surname)

Gale
- Pronunciation: /ˈɡeɪl/ GAYL
- Gender: feminine

Origin
- Origin: short for Abigail

Other names
- Related names: Gayle

Gale is a given name. It has seen masculine and feminine use consecutively in the United States. Gale as a man's name is from an English surname, ultimately from Middle English gaile "jovial". As a woman's name, it is often a short form of the name Abigail. It can also be used as a form of the name Galen, a name derived from that of the ancient Greek physician, meaning "tranquil."

It was almost exclusively a masculine name before 1935; in the later 1930s, it became a popular variant of the feminine name Abigail. Feminine usage surpassed masculine usage in 1940, leading to a further decline in masculine usage, and Gale was predominantly a feminine name when it peaked in popularity in the later 1950s. Its popularity decreased rapidly in the 1960s, falling below rank 1,000 in 1971. In the 1990 census, it was ranked 4,209.

== People called Gale ==
=== Men ===
- Gale Gordon (1906–1995), American actor
- Gale Harold (born 1969), American actor
- Gale McGee (1915–1992), United States Senator from Wyoming
- Gale Sayers (1943–2020), American professional football player (Chicago Bears, 1965–1971)
- Gale Wade (1929–2022), American baseball player

=== Women ===
- Gale Ann Hurd (born 1955), American film producer and screenwriter
- Gale Benson (1944–1972), British model and socialite
- Gale Brewer (born 1951), American politician
- Gale Garnett (born 1942), Canadian singer/actress/writer
- Gale Norton (born 1954), 48th United States Secretary of the Interior
- Gale Sondergaard (1899–1985), American actress

=== Pseudonym ===
- Gale Page, pseudonym of Sally Perkins Rutter (1910–1983), American singer and actress
- Gale Storm, pseudonym of Josephine Owaissa Cottle (1922–2009), American actress

=== Fictional characters ===
- Gale Boetticher, from the TV series Breaking Bad
- Gale Weathers, from the Scream films, played by Courteney Cox
- Gale Hawthorne, from The Hunger Games
- Gale of Waterdeep, from the video game Baldur's Gate 3
- Gale, a supporting protagonist of the webcomic Acception
- Gale, a female violet-backed starling in Angry Birds Stella and The Angry Birds Movie
- Gale, a female wind spirit from Frozen 2
- Gale, an epic rarity brawler, from the Supercell game Brawl Stars
- Gale Cumulus, a supporting character from Elemental
- Gale Beaufort, a background character who does not have any lines, from Cars 3
- Gale, a Supporting Protagonist from Digital Devil saga
- Gale, a goldfish from The West Wing belonging to White House Press Secretary C. J. Cregg

== See also ==
- Gaël (given name)
- Gale (surname)
- Gail (given name)
- Gayle (given name)
- Gale (disambiguation)
- Gael (disambiguation)
- Galen (disambiguation)
