= Wallkill River National Wildlife Refuge =

Part of the National Wildlife Refuge system

- IUCN category IV (habitat/species management area)
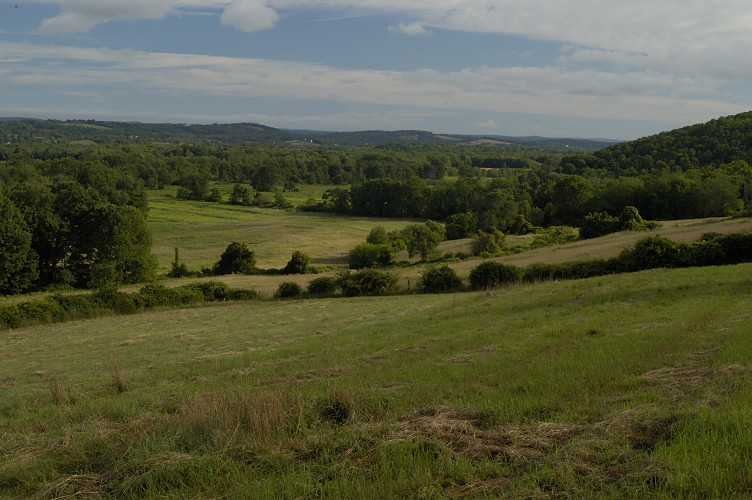
- Wallkill River National Wildlife Refuge looking north

- Location within Sussex County, New Jersey Location within New Jersey Location within the United States
- Location: Sussex County, New Jersey, Orange County, New York, United States
- Nearest city: Sussex, New Jersey
- Coordinates: 41°14′00″N 74°33′00″W
- Area: 5,100 acres (21 km^{2})
- Established: 1990
- Governing body: U.S. Fish and Wildlife Service
- Website: Wallkill River National Wildlife Refuge

Wallkill River National Wildlife Refuge is part of the National Wildlife Refuge system. Established in 1990 by Public Law 101-593, the refuge straddles nine miles (14 km) of the Wallkill River at and just south of the New York-New Jersey border. Most of the refuge is in Sussex County, New Jersey, with the remainder in Orange County, New York. Two miles (3.2 km) of the Appalachian Trail travel through the refuge, and the refuge has four additional walking trails.

The refuge has more than 5,100 acres (21 km^{2}) of land and is managed primarily for conservation of wetlands, including habitat for migratory birds and the endangered bog turtle. Where compatible, the refuge offers outdoor recreation opportunities including hunting, fishing, interpretation, environmental education, photography, wildlife viewing, hiking, canoeing and cross-country skiing. At the northern end of the refuge, in the black dirt wetlands, the refuge manages a series of waterfowl impoundments for migratory waterfowl and shorebirds. Wood ducks, canvasbacks, mergansers, mallards and many other species frequent the refuge during spring and fall migrations. Raptors commonly use the refuge as well, with red-shouldered hawks, northern harriers and kestrels frequently observed.

The Shawangunk Grasslands National Wildlife Refuge, 35 miles (56 km) to the north, is managed as a subunit.

== Gallery ==
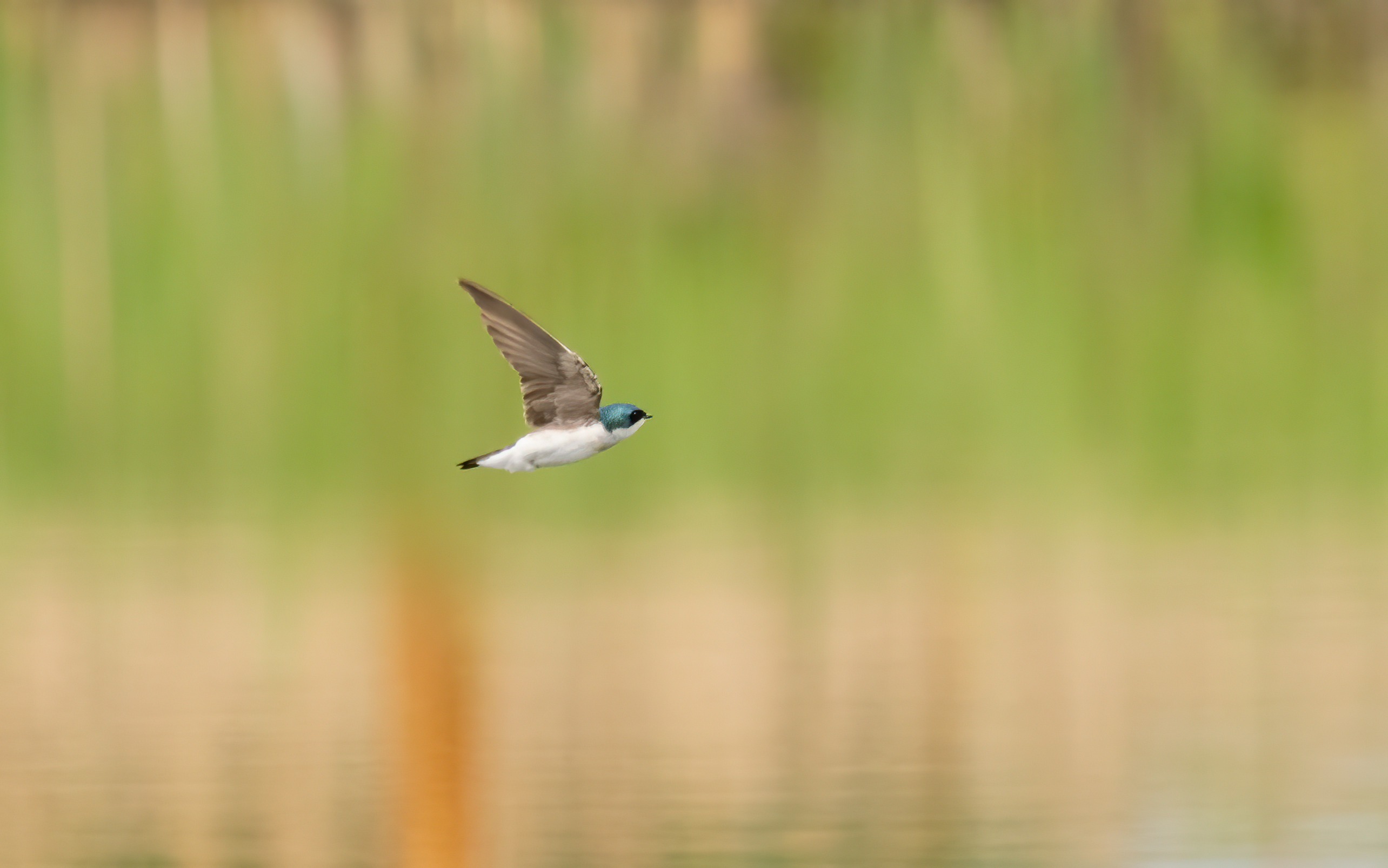
Tree swallow

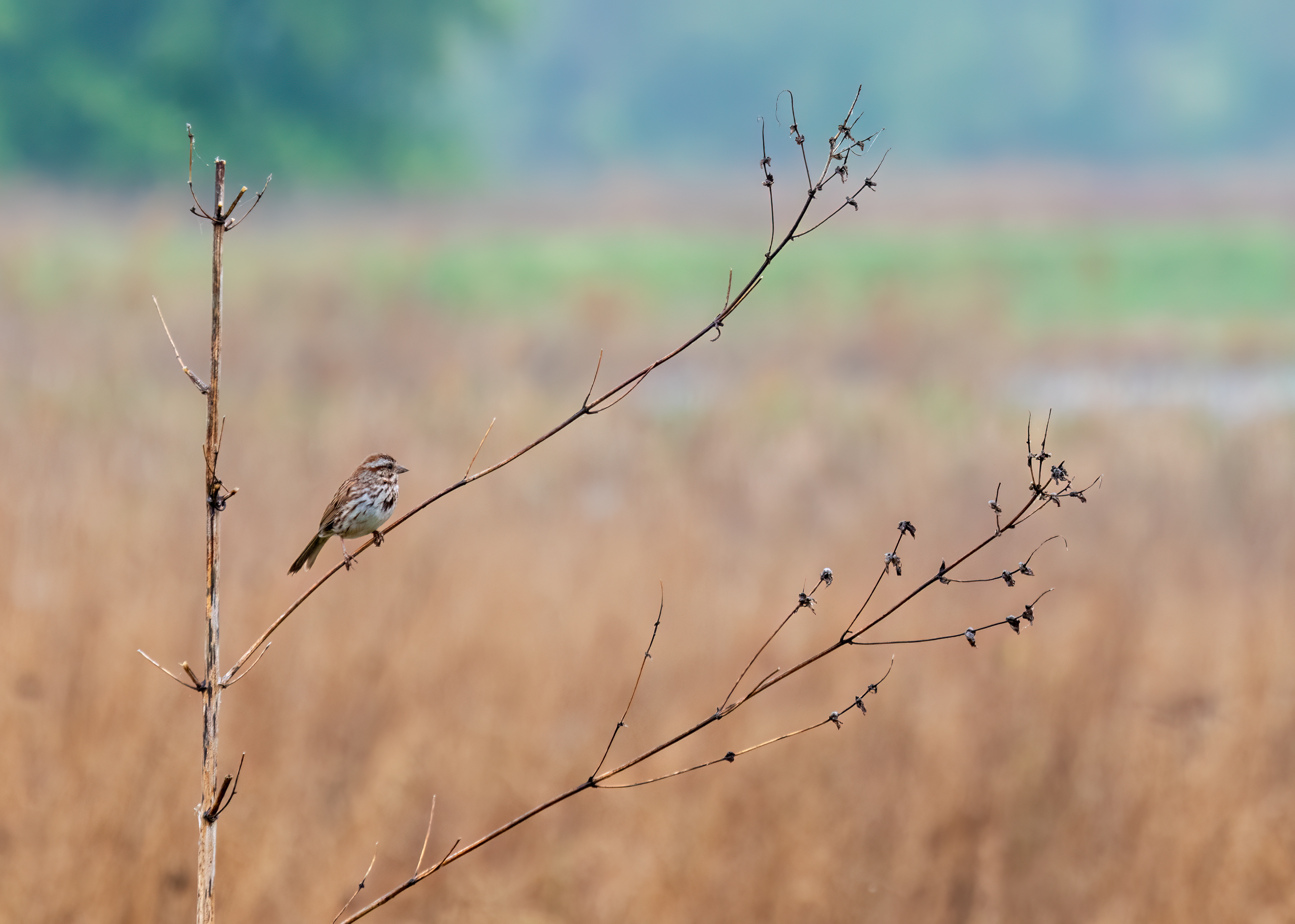
Song sparrow

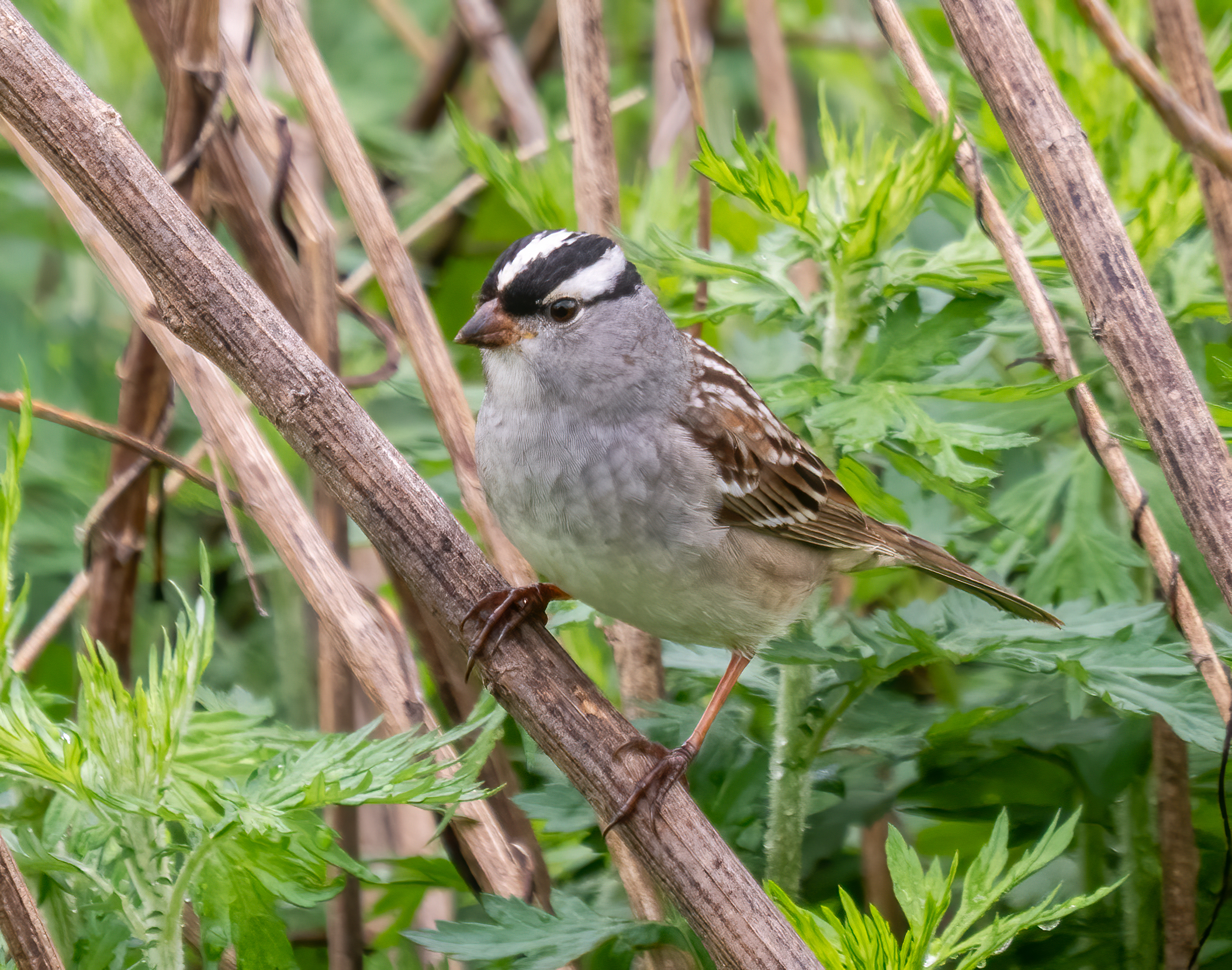
White-crowned sparrow

== See also ==
- List of National Wildlife Refuges of the United States
