= Jeffrey Greeson =

American politician

Member of the New Hampshire House of Representatives from the Grafton 6th district
- In office December 7, 2022 – July 1, 2024
- Preceded by: Gail Sanborn

Member of the New Hampshire House of Representatives from the Grafton 16th district
- In office 2020 – December 7, 2022

Personal details
- Party: Republican

Jeffrey Greeson is an American politician. He served as a Republican member for the Grafton 6th district of the New Hampshire House of Representatives until July 1, 2024.

== Abortion bill ==
In 2022, Greeson sponsored House Bill 1181, which would allow a man to delay a pregnant woman's abortion for weeks or months, and possibly stop it, even if the man was accused or charged with sexual assault or a violent crime against the woman. However, the man would need to swear an affidavit stating he believes he is the father. If the mother challenges his claim a paternity test would be performed. If the mother said the pregnancy was the result of incest, she would have had to pay for DNA testing for herself and the man. Rep. Greeson said his intention was to protect fathers’ rights just as the U.S. Supreme Court had protected the rights of mothers under the 1973 Roe v. Wade decision. “No uterus, no opinion is not the law. That’s only been the operating procedure since 1973,” Greeson said. The bill failed to pass.

== Snow plow confrontation ==
On March 11, 2023, Greeson confronted a snow plow driver for covering his driveway with snow, by standing in front of the truck. The driver had made a video, which went viral; and Greeson was charged with disorderly conduct, criminal threatening and simple assault. He was released on personal recognizance and ordered back to Plymouth District Court on May 18, 2023. He resigned from the House on July 1, 2024.
