= Gail G. Shapiro =

American pediatric allergist

- Born: January 11, 1947; Brooklyn, New York
- Died: August 25, 2006 (aged 59); Seattle, Washington
- Education: M.D., Johns Hopkins University, 1970
- Scientific career
- Fields: Pediatric allergy
- Institutions: Northwest Asthma & Allergy Center; University of Washington School of Medicine

Gail Ina Greenberg Shapiro (January 11, 1947 – August 25, 2006) was an American pediatric allergist based in Seattle. She was a faculty member at the University of Washington School of Medicine. In 2001, she became the first democratically elected president of the American Academy of Allergy, Asthma, and Immunology (AAAAI).

== Biography ==
Shapiro was born Gail Ina Greenberg in 1947 to Jay and Roberta Greenberg. She was born in Brooklyn and raised in Syosset, New York. She studied at Brown University before completing a medical degree at Johns Hopkins University in 1970. She completed her pediatric internship at Johns Hopkins before moving to Seattle to finish her pediatric residency and fellowship in allergy at the University of Washington. She began working as a board-certified allergist at Northwest Asthma & Allergy Center in 1974. She went on to become a senior partner at the center and worked there for the rest of her career.

In addition to working in private practice, Shapiro was a clinical professor of pediatrics at the University of Washington School of Medicine. She performed research into the use of antihistamines and other drugs used in the treatment of allergic disease, as well as possible triggers of asthma in children. In the 1990s, she was involved in establishing and distributing new guidelines for the diagnosis of asthma. She also served on an expert panel for asthma treatment for the National Heart, Lung, and Blood Institute. In 2001, she became the first democratically elected president of the American Academy of Allergy, Asthma, and Immunology (AAAAI).

Shapiro died on August 25, 2006, aged 59, while undergoing heart surgery in Seattle. In October 2006, the American Academy of Pediatrics posthumously awarded her with the Bret Ratner Award for pediatric allergists and immunologists. In 2009, the AAAAI established the Gail G. Shapiro Clinical Faculty Award for specialists in allergy and immunology.
