= Gale (disambiguation) =

A gale is a very strong wind.

Gale may also refer to:

== Places ==
=== United States ===
- Gale, Illinois, a village
- Gale, Indiana, an unincorporated community
- Gale Peak, a mountain in California
- Gale, West Virginia, an unincorporated community
- Gale, Wisconsin, a town
- Gale River, New Hampshire

=== Elsewhere ===
- Gale (crater), on Mars
- Praia da Galé, a beach in Portugal
- Gale (Chalcidice), an ancient Greek colony of Chalcis on Chalkidiki peninsula

== People and fictional characters ==
- Gale (singer), a Puerto Rican pop singer
- Gale (given name)
- Gale (surname)
- Gale (mythology), a Greek mythological witch
- George Gale (cartoonist) (1929–2003), who drew under the name Gale
- Gale, an Angry Birds character

== Other uses ==
- Gale (publisher), a publisher of reference books and databases, formerly known as the Gale Group, then Thomson Gale
- Gale College, a defunct college in Wisconsin, US
- HMNZS Gale (T04), a minesweeper of the Royal New Zealand Navy
- Gale, a variant of the Shannon switching game
- Gale, a parcel of land leased to a Freeminer for mining, principally in the Forest of Dean, England
- Gale, a Brass-Era automobile manufactured by Western Tool Works in Galesburg, Illinois, US
- Global Autonomous Language Exploitation (GALE), a DARPA-funded research program

== See also ==
- Myrica gale, a plant also known as sweet gale, used for flavouring
- Gael
- Gail (disambiguation)
- Gales (disambiguation)
- Gayle (disambiguation)
- Galesville (disambiguation), including Galeville
