= Kevin Maes =

American politician

Member of the New Hampshire House of Representatives
- In office December 3, 2014 – December 2, 2020
- Succeeded by: Gail Sanborn
- Constituency: Grafton 6

Personal details
- Party: Democratic

Kevin G. Maes is an American politician from New Hampshire. He served in the New Hampshire House of Representatives.
