= Jean François Gail =

French classicist, lyricist and librettist

Jean François Gail (1795–1845) was a French classicist, the only son of the prolific hellenist and editor Jean-Baptiste Gail (1755–1829), and his wife Sophie Gail (1775–1819), a singer and composer. His parents married with two decades difference in their ages and were divorced in 1801.

== Career ==
Gail was musical. He wrote many words for songs by Luigi Cherubini, and for Hector Berlioz he wrote the libretto for the cantata La mort de Sardanapale (1830), the last, of Berlioz' four attempts (and first successful one) at the Prix de Rome. His text for the Prix de Rome cantata of Hippolyte-Raymond Colet (L'entrée en Loge, 1834) also proved successful for that composer. In his Réflexions sur le goût musical en France (1832) he criticized French composers who were dazzled by the success of Gioachino Rossini and were tempted to imitate him.

His work Dissertation sur le Périple de Seylax: Et sur l'époque présumée de sa rédaction (1825) marks the beginning of modern critical study of the Periplus of Pseudo-Scylax. He also edited texts of other minor Greek writers on geography.

== Selected works ==
- Récherches sur la nature du culte de Bacchus en Grèce, et sur l'origine de la diversité de ses rites Mémoire qui a remporté le prix proposé à l'Académie des inscriptions et belles-lettres, le 23 juillet 1819. Paris: Gail Neveu & Treuttel et Würtz, 1821. xii, [2] 368 pp.
- Dissertation sur le Périple de Seylax: Et sur l'époque présumée de sa rédaction
- Geographi Graeci Minores: Arriani Periplum Ponti Euxini; Anonymi Periplum Ponti Euxini; Anonymi (Alterius) Periplum Ponti Euxini et Maeotidis
- (with Matthiae) Grammaire raisonnée de la langue grecque: Syntaxe (1831, 1836)
