= Les Deux Jaloux =

One-act opera by Sophie Gail, 1813

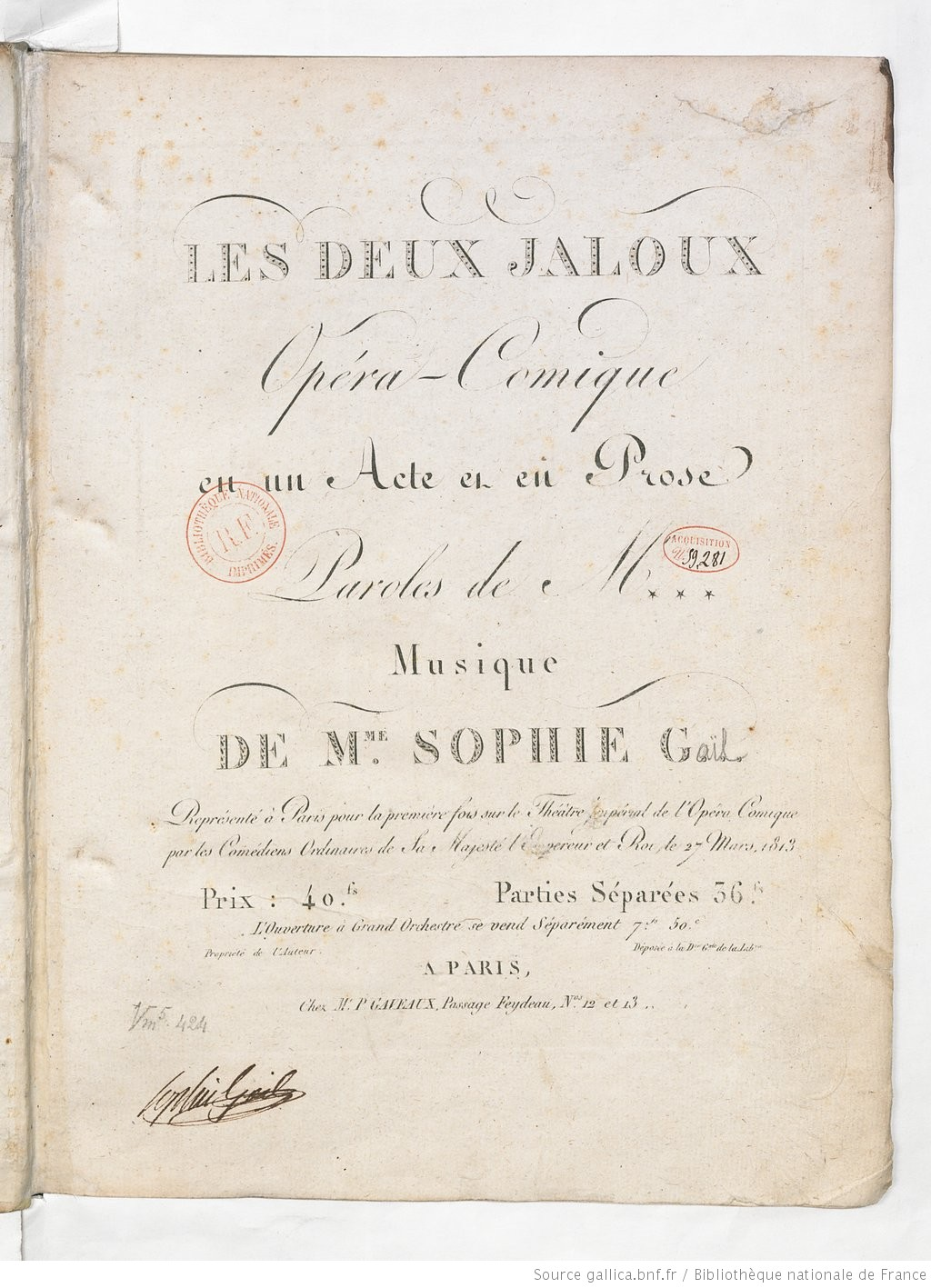
Front cover of 1813 score

Les Deux Jaloux is a French one-act opéra comique composed by Sophie Gail. It was first performed on 27 March 1813 by the Opéra-Comique company at the Théâtre Feydeau, and remained in the company's repertoire until 1839. It was Gail's first opera: she was established as an opera singer and had previously written songs.

The libretto is by Jean-Baptiste-Charles Vial and is based on the 1708 play Le jaloux honteux de l'être by Charles Rivière Dufresny. The plot concerns the romantic adventures of the niece of the president of France.

The opening performance was reviewed in Journal de l'Empire, Journal des arts and Gazette de France.

== Characters ==
Cast list in the published score
Character	Performer
The president	Jean-Baptiste-Sauveur Gavaudan
The president's wife	Mad. Belmont
Lucie, the president's niece	Mad. Moreau
Damis, Lucie's lover, a young officer	M. Ponchard
Thibaut, the president's gardener	M. Lesage
Fanchette, a peasant, lady's maid to the president's wife	Alexandrine Marie Agathe Gavaudan-Ducamel
Frontin, the president's valet	M. Batiste
