= Thomas Gale =

Thomas Gale may refer to:

- Thomas Gale (classical scholar) (1635/36–1702), English classical scholar, antiquarian and cleric
- Thomas Gale (surgeon) (1507–1586), English surgeon
- Tommy Gale (footballer, born 1895) (1895–1976), English footballer
- Tommy Gale (footballer, born 1920) (1920–1975), English footballer
- Tommy Gale (racing driver) (1934–1999), NASCAR race car driver

== See also ==
- Tom Gale (disambiguation)
