= John Gale =

John Gale may refer to:

- John Gale (MP) (1516/17–1554), MP for Tavistock and Totnes
- John Gale (theologian) (1680–1721), British Baptist theologian
- John Gale (journalist) (1831–1929), Australian editor and founder of the Queanbeyan Age
- Jack Gale (1899–1975), Australian rules footballer
- John Gale (British journalist) (1925–1974)
- John Gale (theatre producer) (1929–2025), English theatrical producer and artistic director
- John A. Gale (born 1940), American politician from Nebraska
- John Gale (poker player) (1953–2019), British poker player
- Jack Gale (DJ) (fl. 1950s), disc jockey and discoverer of Ginny Wright
- John Gale (director) (fl. 1970s), Filipino contemporary B-movie director and actor

== See also ==
- John Gayle (disambiguation)
