= Galesville =

Galesville or Galeville may refer to:

== Education ==
United States

- Galesville University, a defunct college in Wisconsin

== Places ==
United States

- Galeville, New York, unincorporated community in Onondaga County
  - Galeville Military Airport, nearby, defunct, now Shawangunk Grasslands National Wildlife Refuge
- Galesville, Illinois, unincorporated community
- Galesville, Maryland, unincorporated community
- Galesville, Wisconsin, city

== See also ==
- Gale (disambiguation)
