= John Gayle =

John Gayle may refer to:

- John Gayle (Alabama politician) (1792–1859), governor of Alabama (1831–1835)
- John Gayle (footballer) (born 1964), English football (soccer) player
- Johnny Gayle (1923–2020), West Indian cricket umpire

== See also ==
- John Gale (disambiguation)
