= John Gale (British journalist) =

British journalist (1925–1974)

John Gale (1925–1974) was a British journalist.

== Early life ==
Gale was born in 1925 in Edenbridge, Kent and studied at Stowe School.

== Career ==
After serving in the army he returned to London and became a successful journalist, working for The Observer during the 1950s and 1960s. He worked closely with the photographer Jane Bown.

He married Jill Robertson, and had three children: Joanna, James and Kiki. They lived in Hampstead Garden Suburb, North London.

He was famous for his quirky, witty, outspoken writing style. He famously took Groucho Marx to a cricket match in the mid-1950s.

While covering the war in Algeria, he saw a number of atrocities that had a direct effect on his mental health. He was treated for manic depression, and committed suicide in 1974, aged 49.

== Works ==
Gale published a number of books which were well received by critics and the public.

- Clean Young Englishman (1965), republished June 27, 1988 by The Hogarth Press and now available as an e-book from Hodder & Stoughton
- Family Man (Hodder & Stoughton, 1968)
- Travels with a Son (1972)
- Camera Man (1979)
