= Sophie Gail =

French singer and composer

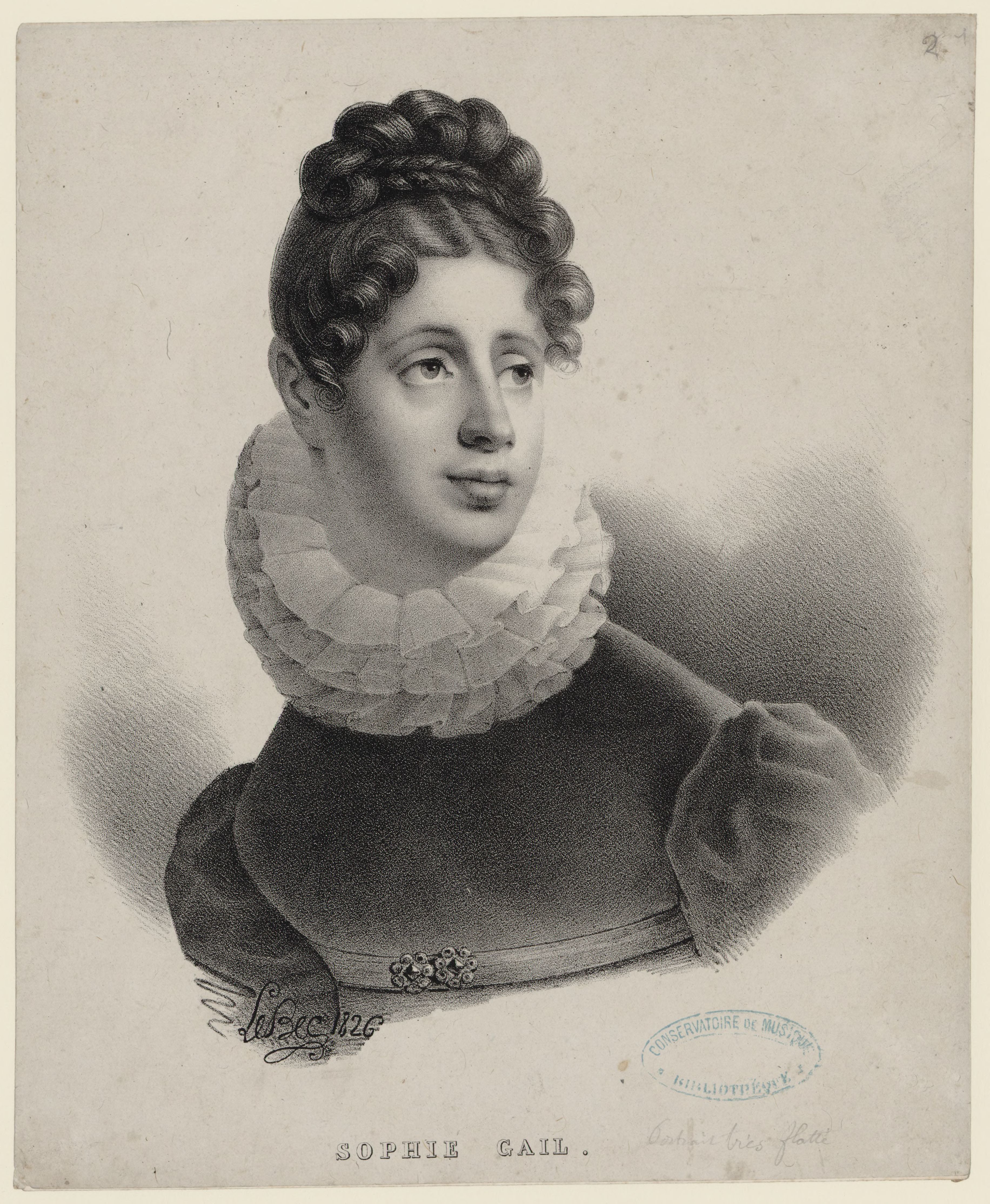
Sophie Gail after Eugène Isabey, 1826

Edmee Sophie Gail née Garre (28 August 1775 – 24 July 1819) was a French singer and composer, famous for writing romances (a French song genre) and opéra comique.

== Life ==
Sophie Garre was born in Paris in the parish of Saint Sulpice, the daughter of Marie-Louise Adelaide Colloz and surgeon Claude-Francois Garre (1730–1799). She studied piano as a child and published her first composition, a romance, at the age of 14. At the age of 19, she married editor Jean-Baptiste Gail (1755–1829) and had one son, Jean François Gail.

She and her husband divorced in 1801, and Sophie Garre toured as a singer in Europe. She studied with Fétis, Perne and Sigismund Neukomm and wrote an opera comique as her first work for theater. Her compositions were praised by the critique Castil-Blaze as "the best works in this genre that flowed from the pen of a woman". Her works were very popular during her lifetime, with her two most popular operas accruing more than 250 performances.

She died in Paris of tuberculosis at the age of 43.

== Works ==
Selected works include:

- 1797, Deus airs for the drama Montoni
- 1813, Les deux jaloux, opéra comique in 1 act
- 1814, Il est vrai que Thibaut mérite, romance
- 1853, Ma Fanchette est charmante, trio
- 1813, Mademoiselle de Launay à la Bastille, opéra-comique in 1 act
- 1813 Ma liberté, ma liberté, romance
- 1814, Angela ou L'atelier de Jean Cousin, opéra comique in 1 act
- 1814, La Méprise, opéra comique in 1 act
- 1818, La Sérénade, opéra
- 1807, N'est-ce pas elle, romance with piano accompaniment
- 1807, La jeune et charmante Isabelle, romance
- 1808, Heure de soir, romance with piano and harp accompaniment
- 1814, Les devoirs du chevalier, romance on a poème de Creuzé de Lesser
- 1814, Variations concertantes for flute and piano
- 1861, Transcription variée de Moeris for piano
- 1815, Prière aux songes, nocturne à deux voix sur un poème de M. Cheurlin, with piano and harp accompaniment
- 1815, Le souvenir du diable
- 1838, Le Diable, chansonnette sur un poème d'Arnault with piano
- 1838, A mes fleurs, with piano
- 1820, Les langueurs et le Le Serment, nocturnes with piano
