= Gail Sanborn =

American politician

Member of the New Hampshire House of Representatives
- In office December 2, 2020 – December 7, 2022
- Preceded by: Kevin Maes
- Succeeded by: Jeffrey Greeson
- Constituency: Grafton District 6

Personal details
- Party: Republican

Gail Sanborn is an American politician from New Hampshire. She served in the New Hampshire House of Representatives.
