= Shawangunk Grasslands National Wildlife Refuge =

Protected area in Ulster County, New York

Shawangunk Grasslands
- IUCN category IV (habitat/species management area)
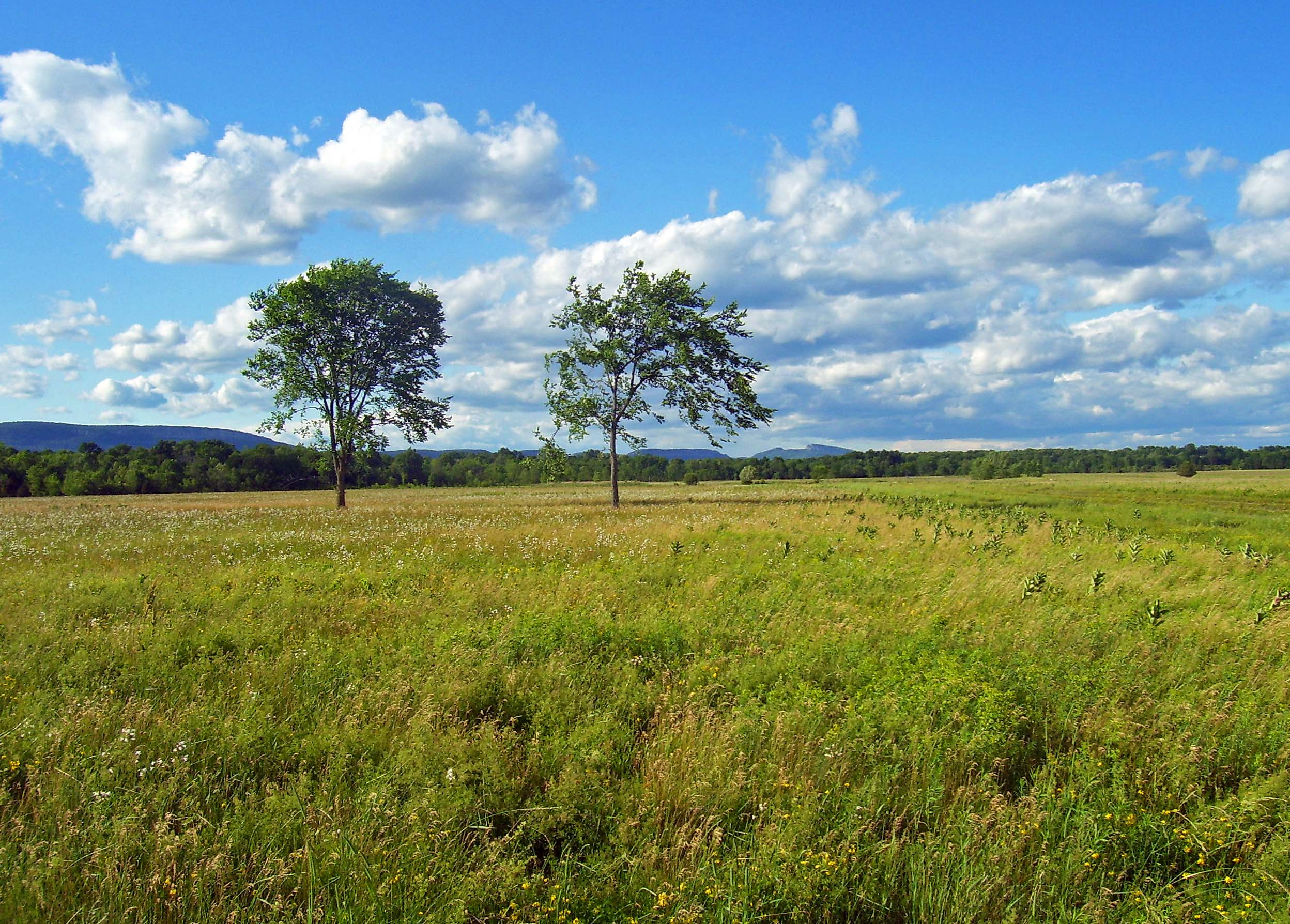
- View of the Shawangunk Ridge from within the Shawangunk Grasslands National Wildlife Refuge.

- Location within New York Location within the United States
- Location: Shawangunk, Ulster, New York, United States
- Coordinates: 41°38′14″N 74°12′17″W
- Area: 0.84 sq mi (2.2 km^{2})
- Established: 1999
- Named for: schawan, Dutch transliteration of Munsee Lenape for "in the smoky air"
- Visitors: 5,500
- Governing body: U.S. Fish and Wildlife Service
- Website: Shawangunk Grasslands National Wildlife Refuge

The Shawangunk Grasslands National Wildlife Refuge is a wildlife refuge located in Ulster County, New York, United States. Formerly the Galeville Military Airport, it was decommissioned in 1994 and turned over to the United States Fish and Wildlife Service in 1999. It serves as a waypoint for grassland-dependent migratory birds.

== History ==
The 565-acre (229 ha) refuge first became federal property in the early 1940s, when the Army bought what was then swampland and filled it in with soil from the nearby flood plains to build Galeville Army Air Field to train pilots as a result of World War II. It stopped using the field years after the war, in the early 1970s and in later years it would be used by the nearby United States Military Academy. FBI agents also trained there. as did the U.S. Marshals Service.

In 1994 the Department of Defense decided it no longer needed the property. Five years later, it was conveyed to the U.S. Fish and Wildlife Service (FWS), which had wanted to protect the land as one of the state's top ten areas for grassland-dependent migratory birds. It is today managed as a subunit of the Wallkill River National Wildlife Refuge, 35 miles (56 km) to the south.

Recently the FWS has begun to mow and deshrub the 400 acres (160 ha) that make up the refuge's core grasslands. This prevents the grasslands from returning to wooded swamp.

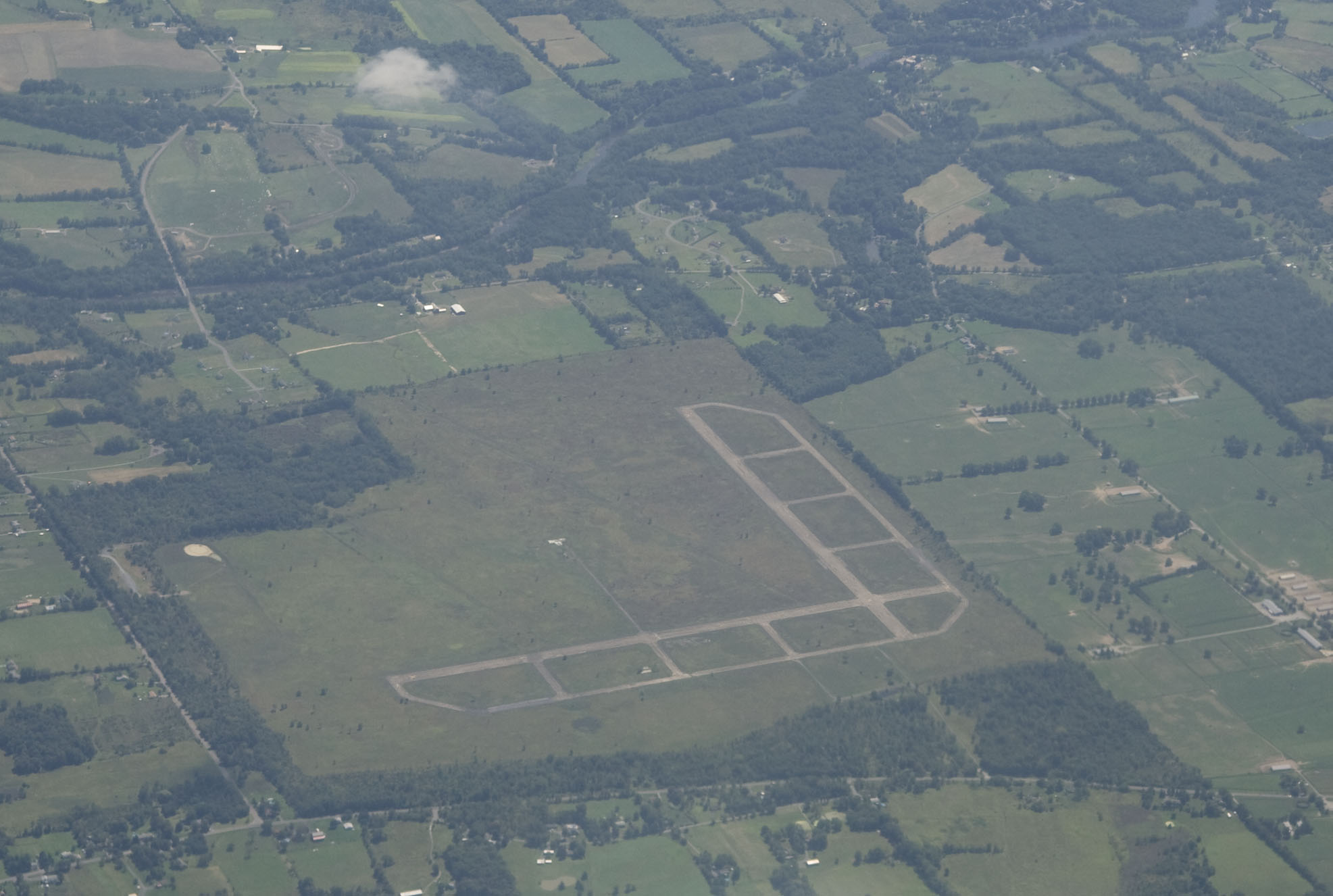
Shawangunk Grasslands NWR seen from 15,000 feet (4,600 m), looking S-E.

== Geography ==
The Shawangunk Grasslands National Wildlife Refuge is situated in the central portion of the town of Shawangunk, closer to the hamlet of Wallkill than Walker Valley. It is a roughly rectangular parcel that sits slightly west of the Wallkill River, just north of the crest of the divide between it and its tributary Shawangunk Kill, itself a relatively unspoiled stream and important habitat the FWS has been working to protect. The site is roughly bounded by Hoagerburgh Road (Ulster County 18) on the west, Albany Post Road (Ulster County 9) on the east, Long Lane (Ulster County 18A) on the north and Bates Lane to the south. Public access is provided near the southwest corner, off Hoagerburgh.

The central area of the property, the former airport, is bounded on all sides by woodland and shrubland (except for a small corridor around the main public access road) which makes up 165 acres (66 ha) of the total. The 400 acres (160 ha) that account for the core grassland also boast the former airport's 3,500-foot–long (1,067 m) runways and equivalent taxiways, taking up about 30 acres (12 ha) along the southern and western bounds of the grasslands. From this open space, it is possible to see the Shawangunk Ridge to the west.

== Geology ==
Like much of the Hudson Valley, the Shawangunk Grasslands show the signs of glaciation during the last Ice Age, even though they were created much more recently through human action. The topsoil in the grasslands contains a high level of clay, which forms a barrier to most water filtering downward. Throughout the entire refuge, the water table is at least 3 feet (1 m) below the surface. Frequent freezing and melting during the winter results in pit-and-hummock topography throughout much of the refuge.

== Ecology and biology ==
The grasslands created by the airport's construction are one of only two such locations in the region that can support the 12 species of birds dependent on them. Some of them, according to the FWS, need at least 10–20 acres (4.0–8.1 ha), per nesting pair. 190 bird species, 58 of which breed there, have been documented in the refuge.

=== Fauna ===
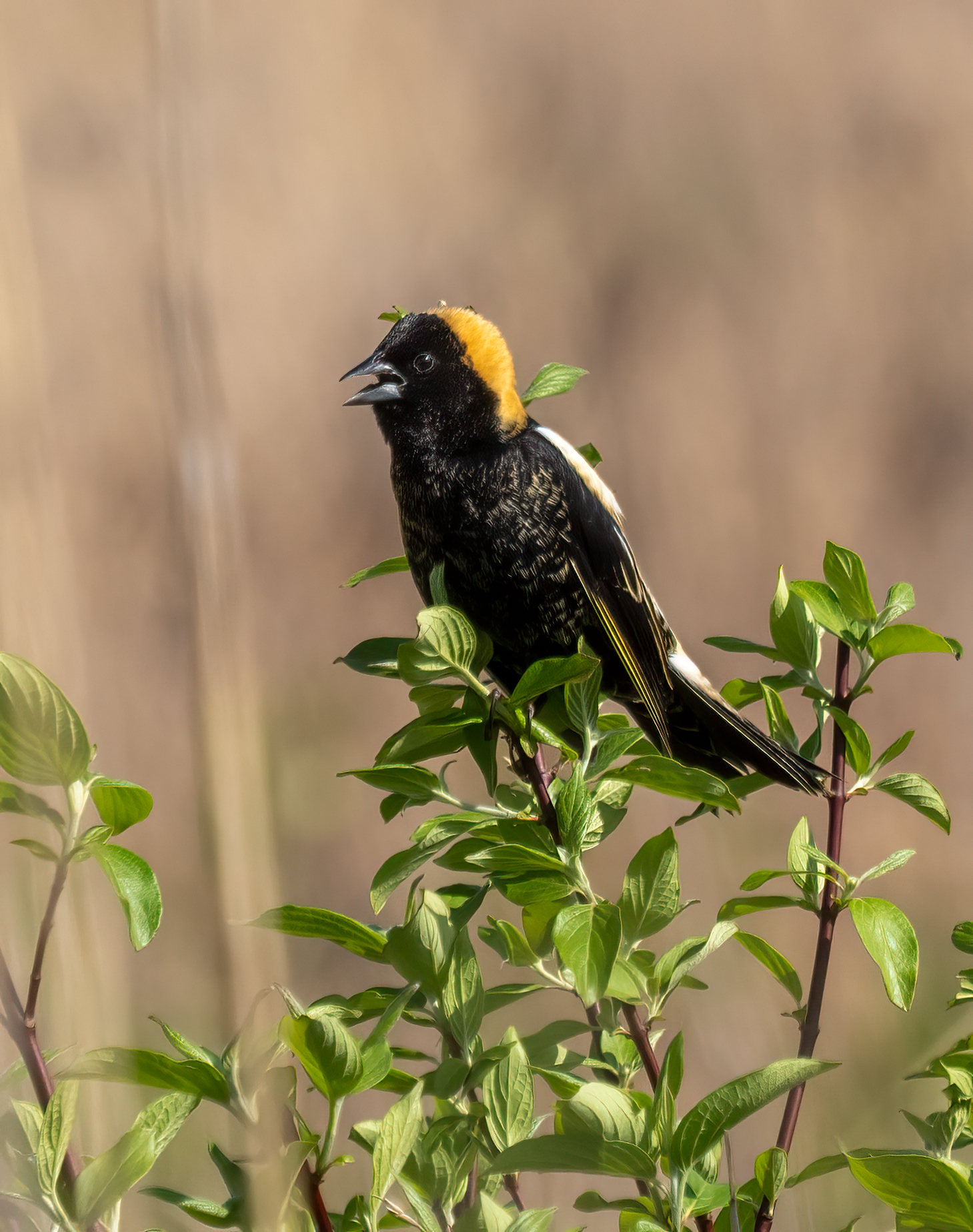
Bobolink singing

The Shawangunk Grasslands are especially important to these grassland-dependent species:

- Bobolink
- Eastern meadowlark
- Grasshopper sparrow
- Horned lark
- Northern harrier
- Savannah sparrow
- Short-eared owl
- Upland sandpiper
- Henslow's sparrow

In addition several hawk and falcon species (not grassland-dependent) have been seen at the site, and black-billed cuckoo and wood thrush have been nesting in the woodland portions. Non-bird species that have settled into the habitat include several turtle species, small-mouthed bass and sunfish in the one small pond on the site and white-tailed deer in the woodlands.

The FWS has also been alerted to the possibility that Indiana bats, a federal endangered species, may be exploiting opportunities provided by the refuge. A hibernaculum of 30,000 bats has been reported 18 miles (29 km) to the northeast, and there is evidence that some have roosted closer to the refuge. The agency has been monitoring the refuge to see if any Indiana bats have begun to use dead trees as roosting sites or begin to forage on the site.

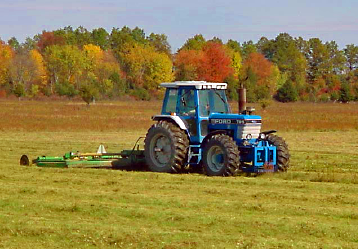
The FWS has been mowing 200–300 acres (81–121 ha) a year to maintain the grassland since 2002

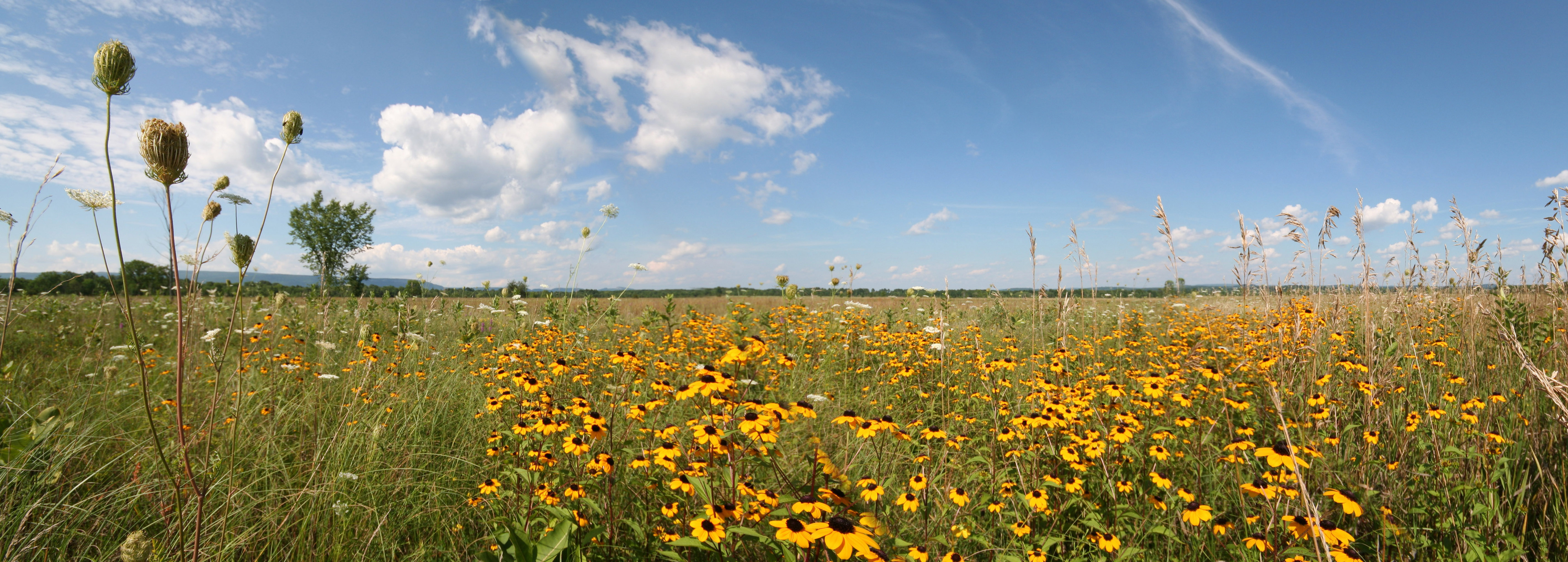
Shawangunk Grasslands in summer

=== Flora ===
While the refuge is protected primarily for the bird life, several rare or uncommon plant species have also been found in the grasslands, where Kentucky bluegrass is the dominant species Frank's sedge, small-flowered agrimony, purple milkweed, small white aster, Bush's sedge, coontail and watermeal. A few tree species, such as white ash, American elm, eastern red cedar, and pin oak, also flourish in those sections. The woodlands on the periphery are dominated by several oak species, red maple, sugar maple, shagbark hickory and tulip trees.

The grasslands have also been inviting for several invasive species, most notably purple loosestrife and gray dogwood. FWS's mowing and other grassland-preservation efforts are aimed at removing or controlling those species.

== Management ==
In 2002, the Fish and Wildlife Service finished its first final Comprehensive Conservation Plan for the Shawangunk Grasslands. Its primary goal in managing the area is to preserve and, where possible, extend the existing grassland. By mowing, deshrubbing and continuing to work with local farmers who are allowed to graze animals on the land and hay it under special use permits, it hopes to maintain a diverse enough selection of grasses for all species. Similarly, one mature tree per 10 acres (4 ha) of grassland will be maintained for predatory bird species.

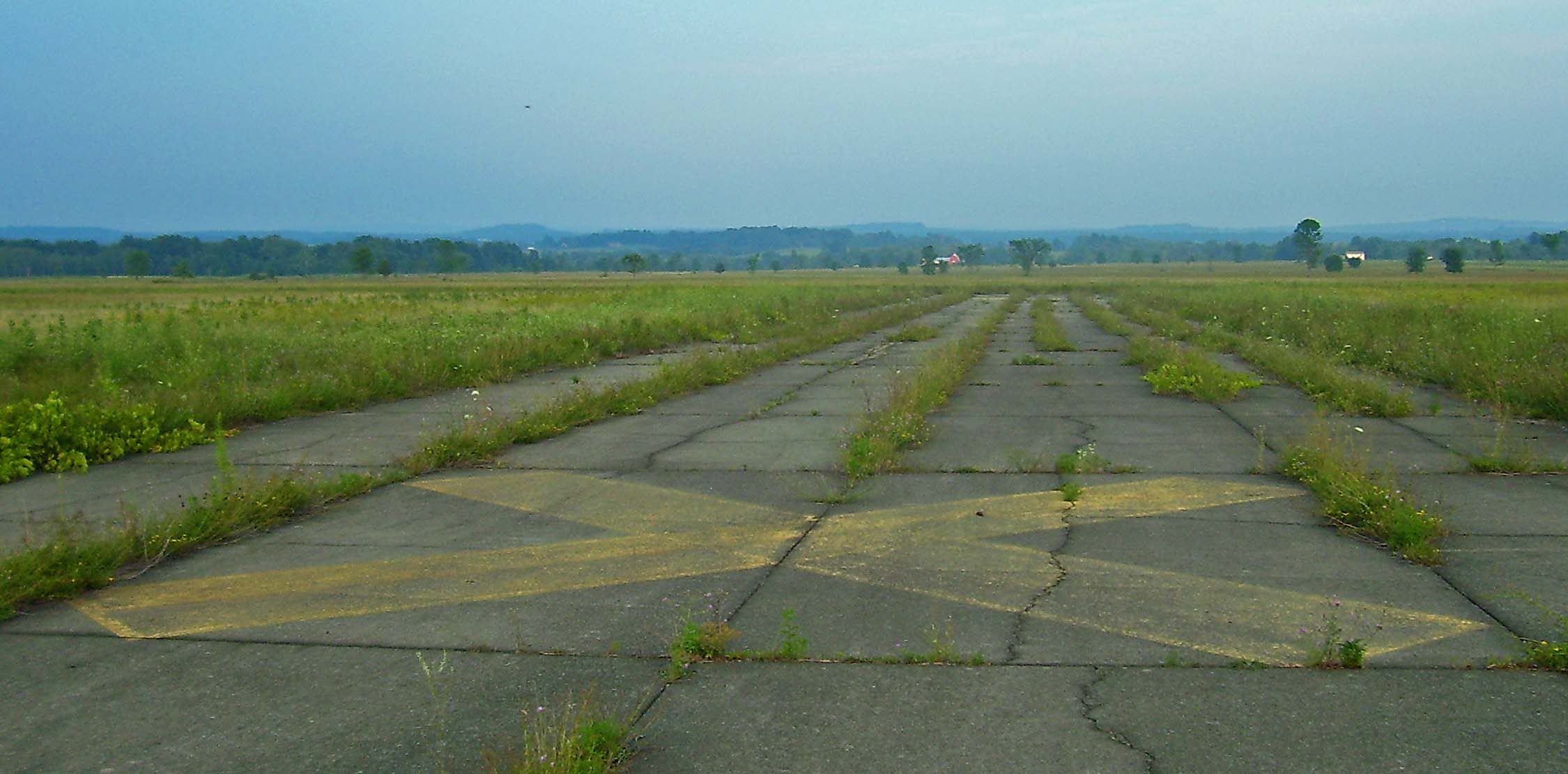
Abandoned runway, already slowly returning to grassland. Yellow cross indicates to aircraft that the airport is officially closed.

In the longer term, FWS plans to create up to 30 acres (12 ha) of additional grassland by removing the runway pavement and restoring the original cover. An 8-foot (2 m) wide strip of concrete would be left for use as a public trail. While grasses are already beginning to grow through cracks in the runways, the agency would prefer not to wait as aircraft continue to make illegal landings at the refuge, disturbing the birds, despite markings on the runways themselves and on aviation charts of the area indicating that the facility is closed. It has not yet determined how this will be done in the most environmentally sensitive fashion. Similarly, it hopes to restore the original stream pattern through the property by removing the culverts and other reroutings made during construction of the airfield.

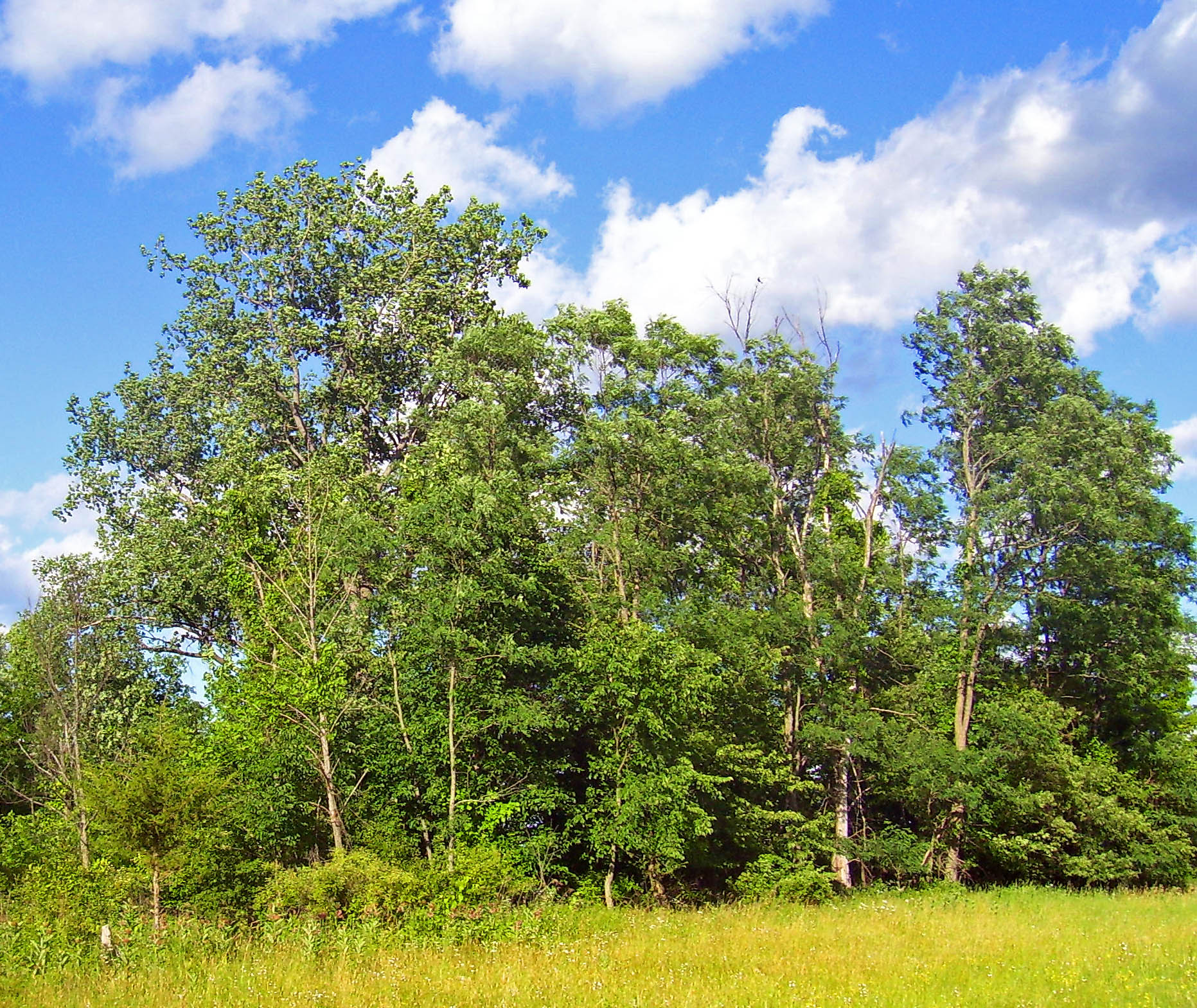
Some of the woodlands at the edge of the refuge.

Since the woodlands surrounding the grasslands cannot be converted into grasslands, FWS will maintain them as such. The 26 acres (10 ha) of grass and shrublands within the woods, which also have become important habitat, will be allowed to return to woodland.

FWS has also committed itself to exploring a number of ways to control the invasive plant species in the refuge, such as herbicides, releasing beetle and weevil species that feed on the invaders and annual prescribed burns in addition to the methods it already employs. Its goal is to reduce their presence to less than 10% of the refuge within 10 years.

Some of its employees have expressed concerns about whether any pollutants might be left over from previous military use of the site, particularly around a communications center demolished in 1973. While the agency does not presently believe there is any cause for concern, it will be monitoring the situation and plans an environmental assessment.

=== Partner organizations ===
The FWS has credited other organizations, public and private, with helping it to fulfill its goals for the refuge. The former is represented by its state-level counterpart, the New York State Department of Environmental Conservation (NYSDEC), which has shared data with it, participated in the planning process and works with local communities to protect wildlife habitat. Among the latter, the local and state Audubon Society chapters advocated strongly for the area's protection, since the society had declared the airport site an Important Bird Area in 1998. Other organizations have played supporting roles by helping to perform management tasks and raising awareness. There is a Friends of Shawangunk Grasslands National Wildlife Refuge, which was formed in 2017. This refuge is staffed by two FWS volunteers.

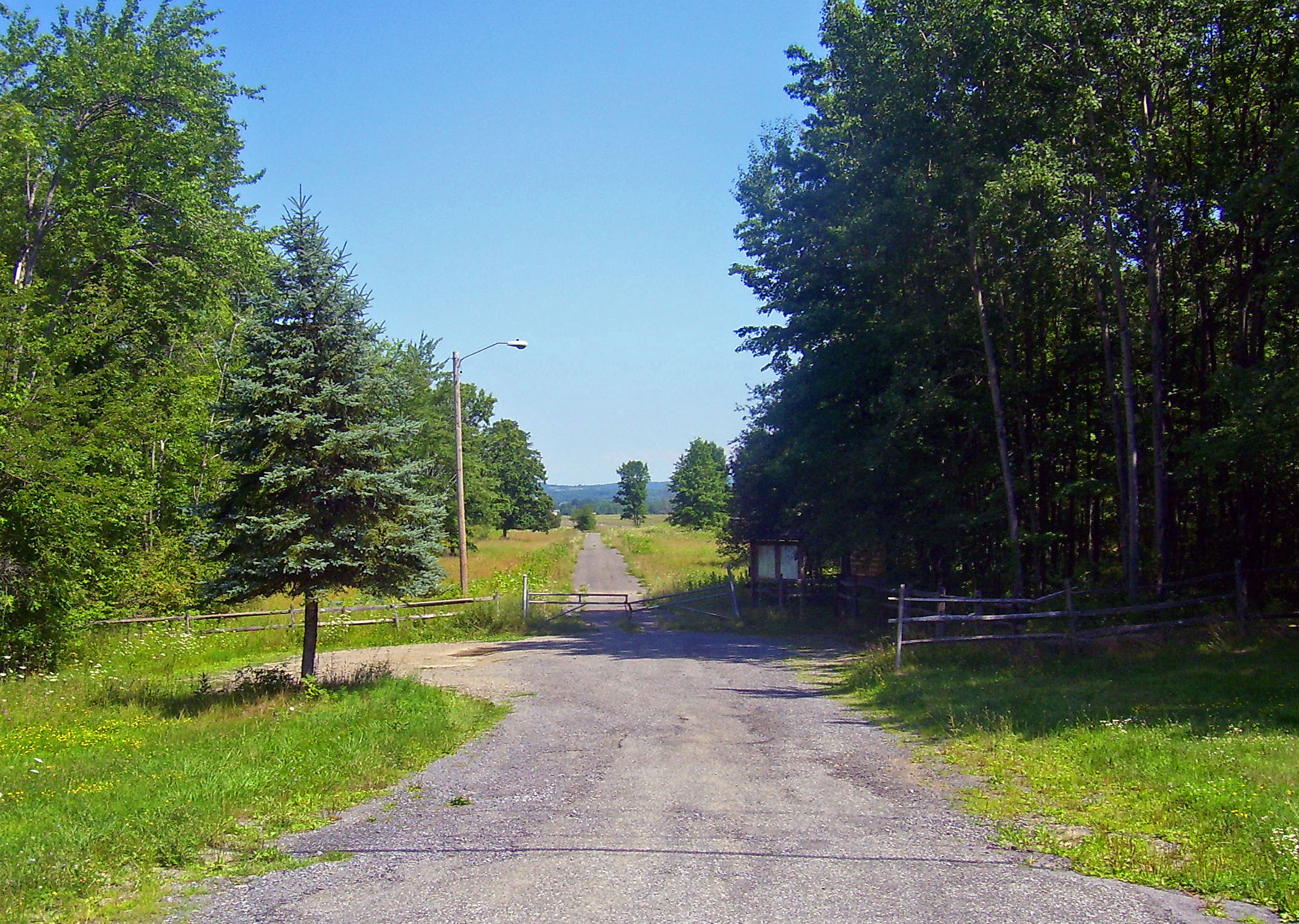
The existing public access point and parking lot, which FWS would like to expand.

== Recreation ==
While the refuge is easily accessible to the public, activities within it are strictly limited to those that are wildlife-dependent: walking, nature photography, birdwatching and, in winter, snowshoeing and cross-country skiing. Jogging is not allowed, nor is any activity that would bring other animals (such as dogs or horses) or motorized vehicles into the area, since that would likely disturb the nesting birds. All visitors must remain on the paved roads, parking areas, trails or the observation platform. The refuge is open sunrise to sunset year-round.

Among the motorized vehicles banned from the refuge as are radio-controlled aircraft and drones. Model airplane enthusiasts, who took to the site and its abandoned runways before it was transferred to FWS, had hoped to continue to be allowed to do so under its management. Many of them wrote in with public comments favoring their hobby, saying wild birds and model airplanes could indeed coexist as they had for 30 years of model aviation at the former airport. While eventually 90% of the comments that addressed it supported model airplaning, FWS did not believe that it was compatible with the goal of preserving a safe habitat for the birds, and officially banned it. Academy of Model Aeronautics president Carl Maroney charged that the agency had made up its mind before soliciting public input. Three years later, the controversy had still not faded as Eastern U.S. Free Flight Conference president Robert Langelius told Congress that the USFWS had been "completely intransigent" and that many enthusiasts had given up the sport for lack of available space.

FWS was also criticized by animal rights groups for its decision to allow bowhunting of deer on the refuge during the state season in the fall, the only hunting it decided was compatible with the refuge's mission. Most bowhunters, it responded, will be using tree stands on the perimeter and will only need to enter the site briefly to retrieve any kills. It will be administered under a special fee permit system. Catch-and-Release Fishing will also be permitted in the refuge's pond, but it will not be stocked although it may be expanded if it proves to be a popular enough activity.

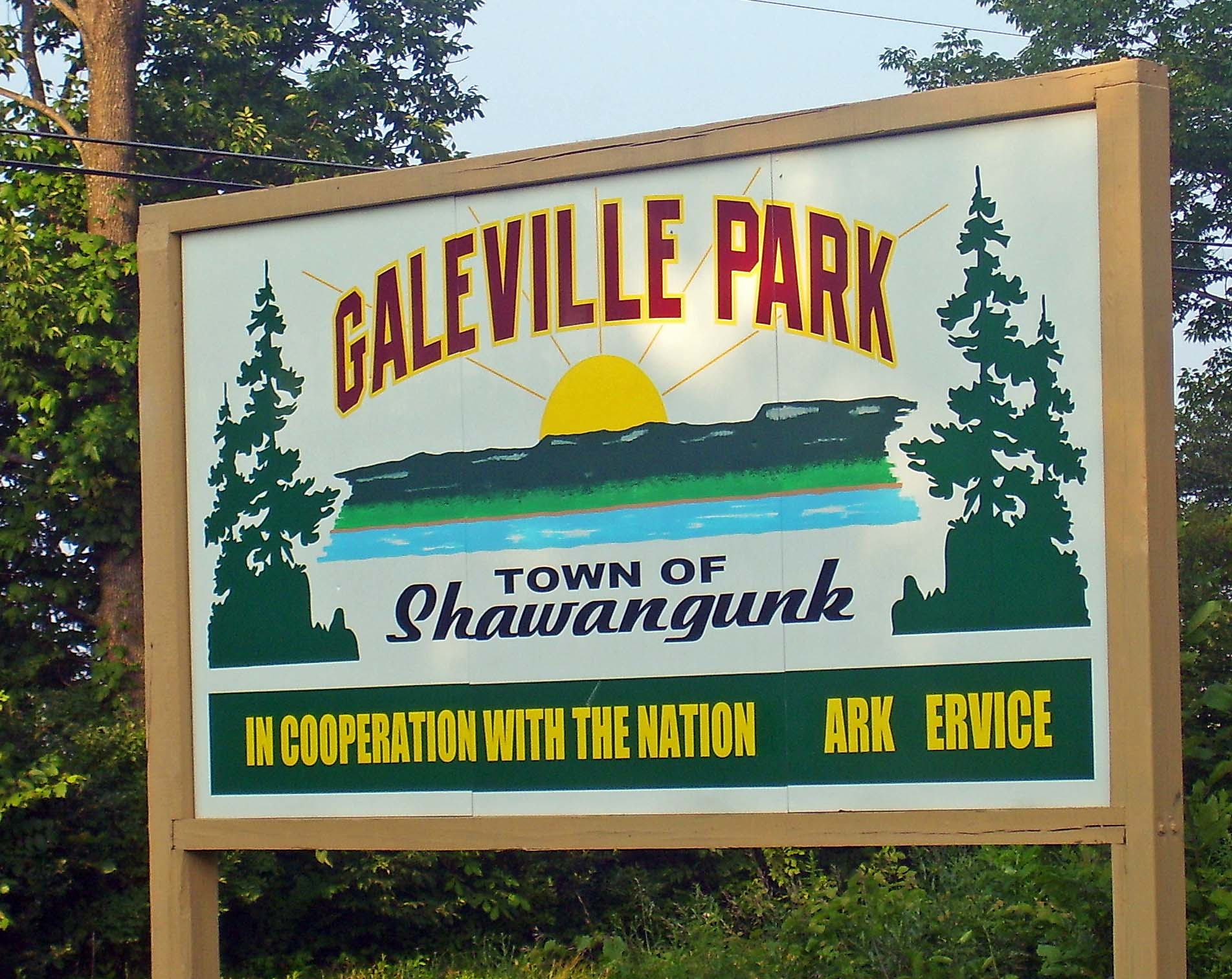
Sign for town park

Currently, the agency estimates the refuge receives about 20,000 visitors a year, contributing $257,840 to the local economy. The FWS also makes annual revenue sharing payments to the town at various amounts between $2–3,000 a year. Most visitors have been birdwatchers, many drawn by the chance to watch the short-eared owl, one of the few owls that hunt in daylight. Ultimately the agency hopes to provide a more complete trail system, possibly connecting to an adjacent 55-acre (22 ha) town park and allowing better wildlife viewing. It would like to expand the current parking area and provide an interior contact point for the public, with one employee at the refuge at all times.

== See also ==
- List of National Wildlife Refuges of the United States
