= Abigail (footballer) =

Brazilian footballer (1921–2007)

Abigail Conceição de Souza
Personal information
- Date of birth: 12 October 1921
- Place of birth: Porto Alegre, Rio Grande do Sul, Brazil
- Date of death: 27 December 2007 (aged 86)
- Place of death: Porto Alegre, Rio Grande do Sul, Brazil
- Position: Full-back

Senior career*
Years	Team	Apps	(Gls)
1942	Força e Luz (RS)		
1942–1950	Internacional (RS)		
1950–1954	Nacional (RS)		
- * Club domestic league appearances and goals

Abigail Conceição de Souza (12 October 1921 in Porto Alegre, Rio Grande do Sul – 27 December 2007 in Porto Alegre, Rio Grande do Sul) was a Brazilian football (soccer) player.

He began playing football at the age of twelve. Abigail was a full back and began his career with Força e Luz football Club of Porto Alegre club that are obsolete today. In February 1942, at the age of twenty years, he was signed by Inter where he was part of the legendary "Scroll Compressor" Colorado (considered by some critics as the greatest team that existed in Rio Grande do Sul).

In the famous campaign of the Inter hexacampeonato gaucho, Abigail won four of the six titles. In addition, he served in Grenal 1948, where the famous classic Inter applied a 7–0 rout over the tricolor gaucho.

== Clubs ==
- Força e Luz (RS): 1942
- Internacional (RS): 1942 - 1950
- Nacional (RS): 1950 - 1954

== Honours ==
- Campeonato Gaúcho: six times (1942, 1943, 1944, 1945, 1947 and 1948).
