= Robert Gale =

Robert Gale may refer to:

== People ==
- Robert Gale (musician), trombonist
- Robert Henry Otley Gale (1878–1950), Canadian politician
- Robert Peter Gale (born 1945), medical researcher
- Bob Gale (born 1951), screenwriter
- Bob Gale (basketball) (1925–1975), American basketball player
- Bob Gale (cricketer) (1933–2018), English cricketer and businessman

== Fictional chartacters ==
- Robert Gale, in the TV series 12 Monkeys
