= George Gale (cartoonist) =

George Paterson Gale (11 June 1929 – 17 September 2003) was a Scottish-born political cartoonist, who worked mainly in England. He drew under the name of Gale.

== Career ==
Gale was born in Leven, Fife, Scotland, the son of John Gale, a civil engineer, and his wife Mary Paterson. He trained as an engineering draughtsman, and undertook National Service with the Royal Army Medical Corps.

After a short return to Scotland, he moved to London where he studied briefly at Saint Martin's School of Art. In 1952 he began work as a graphic artist at Ravenna Studios, Putney, which remained his principal employment until 1977. While there, however, he also began to work freelance as a cartoonist.

From the late 1960s, he contributed cartoons regularly to the left-wing weekly, Tribune. In 1972, William Rees-Mogg, editor of The Times, invited him to supply cartoons for the newspaper's "Europa" supplement: his most notable contribution was a pastiche of the Bayeux Tapestry, spread over six pages, in the launch issue of January 1973, which marked Britain's entry into the European Economic Community by chronicling the events leading up to it. He continued to produce weekly cartoons for The Times until 1980. He also contributed to many other publications, including a regular pocket cartoon entitled "Mayor's Eye View" for his local paper, the Richmond and Twickenham Times.

In 1986 he was invited by the editor Max Hastings to join The Daily Telegraph, to take the place of cartoonist Nicholas Garland, who had left to join the newly launched Independent. This was to be his only staff appointment. He reportedly had a difficult relationship with Hastings, and also found his cartoons being mocked in the satirical magazine Private Eye. He left in 1988 when Garland returned to the Telegraph.

From 1989 to 2003 he was cartoonist and main illustrator for the parliamentary weekly The House, contributing covers (many in colour), caricatures, and other drawings. He continued this work after returning to live in Edinburgh in 2002.

His strength and his weakness as a cartoonist was considered to be his "refined and courteous style", which meant that his drawings tended to lack the edge or bite of some of his contemporaries.

== Personal life ==
Gale married Elizabeth (Betty) Watson, a teacher, in 1954. They had one son, the journalist and author Iain Gale.
