= Jean-Baptiste Gail =

French scholar (1755–1829)

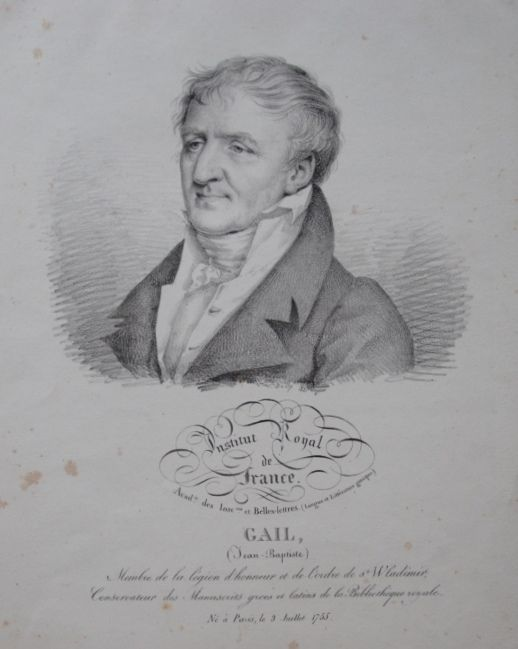
Jean-Baptiste Gail

Jean-Baptiste Gail (1755–1829) was a French Hellenist scholar, member of the Institut de France (French Institute).

== Early years ==
Gail was born in Paris on July 4, 1755. In 1791 he was appointed deputy, and in 1792 titular professor at the Collège de France. During the French Revolution, he maintained his professional duties, taking no part in politics, although he managed to ingratiate himself with those in authority.

== Career ==
In 1815 he was appointed by King Louis XVIII to the post of keeper of Greek manuscripts in the royal library over the heads of the candidates proposed by the other conservators, an appointment which made him many enemies. Gail believed there was an organized conspiracy to belittle his learning and professional success, and there was a feud between him and his literary opponents, the most distinguished of whom was PL Courier.

== Achievements ==
Without being a great Greek scholar, Gail was a hard worker, devoted to his favourite studies, and effectively rescued Greek from the neglect into which it had fallen during the revolutionary period. The list of Gail's published works filled 500 quarto pages of the introduction to his edition of Xenophon. The most notable of these is his edition of Theocritus (1828). He also wrote a number of elementary educational works, based on the principles of the school of Port-Royal. His communications to the Académie des Inscriptions being coldly received and seldom accorded the honour of print, he inserted them in a vast compilation in 24 volumes, which he called Le Philologue, containing a mass of ill-digested notes on Greek grammar, geography, archaeology, and various authors.

A list of his works will be found in JM Quérard, La France littéraire (1829), including the contents of the volumes of Le Philologue.

== Personal life and death ==
Gail married singer and composer Sophie Gail and was the father of classicist Jean François Gail. Jean-Baptiste died in Paris on February 5, 1829.
