= Gailes =

Gailes may refer to:

- Gailes, Queensland, Australia
- Gailes Links, Glasgow Golf Club, near Irvine, North Ayrshire, Scotland
