= Gales Creek (North Carolina) =

Coordinates: 34.7443551°N 76.9022089°W

Gales Creek is a creek bordering the communities of Broad Creek and Gales Creek in the U.S. state of North Carolina. Gales Creek empties into Bogue Sound, which is separated from the Atlantic Ocean by Bogue Banks, part of North Carolina's barrier islands known as the Southern Outer Banks. The creek also runs through the Croatan National Forest.

Upstream along Gales Creek and further into the Pocosin, is a camp for youth operated by East Carolina Council, Boy Scouts of America. It is called Camp Sam Hatcher.

The area is included in the state-defined growing region for Bogue Sound Watermelons, an effort to market the area's traditional agricultural commodity following the model of the Vidalia Onion.
