= Gales Creek, North Carolina =

City in North Carolina

Coordinates: 34.7443551°N 76.9022089°W

The Gales Creek area of Carteret County, North Carolina, United States is part of the greater Newport area.

Gales Creek empties into Bogue Sound, which is separated from the Atlantic Ocean by Bogue Banks, part of North Carolina's barrier islands known as the Southern Outer Banks.

A Presbyterian Church Camp, Camp Albemarle, is located near the mouth of Gales Creek at the former home of Henry Wilkins Hibbs, 1862–1942, the second mayor of St. Petersburg, Florida and the founder of that city's commercial fishing industry.

Upstream along Gales Creek and further into the Pocosin, was another camp for youth operated by the Eckerd Youth Alternatives program, Camp E-Ma-Henwu. Eckerd leased the property from East Carolina Council, Boy Scouts of America. Camp Sam Hatcher is a Boy Scout camp operated on the same property by East Carolina Council, BSA.

The area is included in the state-defined growing region for Bogue Sound Watermelons, an effort to market the area's traditional agricultural commodity following the model of the Vidalia Onion.
