= Scott Gaille =

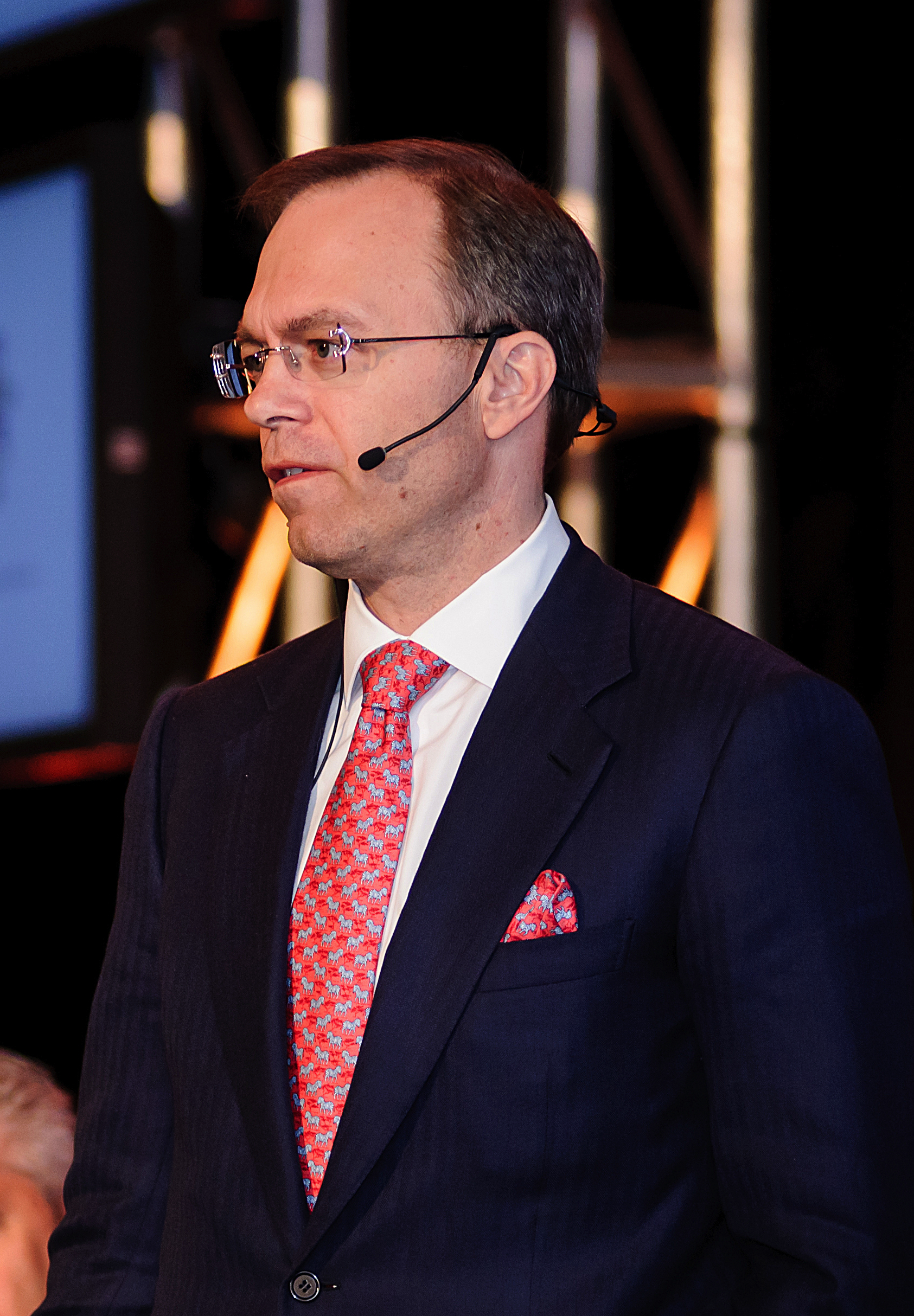
- Gaille speaking at the 2012 Namibia Oil & Gas Conference

Shelby Scott Gaille (born 1969) is an American lawyer and academic. He is on the faculty of The University of Chicago Law School and previously taught for 16 years at Rice University’s Graduate School of Business. Gaille is the author of eight books and an influential figure on the topic of energy law. Having traveled to more than 100 countries, Gaille has built business relationships with a culturally diverse range of partners from around the globe.

== Early life and education ==
Born in Corpus Christi, Texas, Gaille graduated from the University of Texas at Austin (B.A., 1992, High Honors and Phi Beta Kappa), majoring in Government and minoring in Philosophy, and from the University of Chicago Law School (Doctor of Law, 1995, High Honors and Order of the Coif). Gaille was an Olin Fellow in Law and Economics at the University of Chicago, where he was elected to the University of Chicago Law Review and served as Executive Editor of the Harvard Journal of Law and Public Policy. Through various economic workshops at the University of Chicago, Mr. Gaille participated in the analysis of certain issues with Nobel Laureates Ronald Coase and Gary Becker, and worked as a research assistant to The Honorable Judge Richard Posner of the United States Court of Appeals for the 7th Circuit.

== Legal and energy sector career ==
Following law school, Gaille accepted a Judicial Clerkship with the Honorable Chief Judge J. Harvie Wilkinson, III of the United States Court of Appeals for the 4th Circuit (1995-1996) and afterwards joined the law firm of Vinson & Elkins LLP, where he practiced in the firm's Energy Section. At Vinson & Elkins, Gaille represented energy companies in a range of transactional, regulatory and litigation matters implicating issues in the energy industry.

In October 2001, Gaille joined Occidental Petroleum Corporation’s Dubai, United Arab Emirates office, where he managed a range of legal and business development matters for the corporation's eastern hemisphere subsidiaries in Saudi Arabia, Qatar, Oman, Libya, Pakistan and the United Arab Emirates. He received the President's Award from the corporation for his innovative structuring of the Oman Gas Project. In 2004, Gaille became Director – Business Development for Occidental Oil & Gas Corporation, where his principal responsibilities were acquiring exploration concessions in Africa and South America and managing the companies’ relationships with oil ministries in those regions.

In August 2007, Gaille departed Oxy with private equity backing to found the Gaille Group (www.gaillegroup.com), which has launched and incubated a series of businesses in the energy and financial services sectors. The Gaille Group's ventures have included the founding of Sequent Asset Management, LLC ($400 million in assets raised from 2008-2010) and the acquisition of petroleum concession rights in several African nations. Gaille has frequently served as an executive and/or a member of the board of directors of both public and private companies, including as Managing Director & General Counsel of Sequent Asset Management and as the Chief Compliance Officer, General Counsel, and Corporate Secretary of a NASDAQ-listed energy company (ZaZa Energy Corporation).

In 2015, Scott founded an energy projects law firm, GAILLE PLLC. His practice focuses on representing clients in domestic and international energy transactions and serving as outside general counsel to energy companies. He also serves as a certified mediator in disputes involving energy projects.

== Academic career ==
In 2007, Gaille joined the faculty of Rice University's Graduate School of Business, where he has focused on delivering practical energy expertise to business students. The course developed by Gaille, International Energy Development, provides students with a framework for acquiring, managing and divesting international energy projects. In 2012, Gaille published the textbook International Energy Development, which is based on his teachings at Rice. Subsequently, Gaille also taught Energy Infrastructure in the Energy Transition, focusing on the manner in which solar, wind, and battery storage projects were being integrated into existing networks.

In 2013, the University of Chicago Law School appointed Gaille a lecturer in Law. Gaille teaches the Energy Law Seminar and the Energy Transaction Seminar, both of which expose law students to current issues facing energy law practitioners. He also has served on the Law School's Visiting Committee.

Outside of his academic appointments, Gaille regularly speaks on a variety of energy topics. Among other venues, Gaille has lectured on energy issues at the University of Texas at Austin's Energy Symposium, the University of Chicago Booth School of Business’ Emerging Markets Summit, Marathon Oil Corporation’s executive training program, Chevron's San Ramon management training program, the Namibian Oil & Gas Conference, the Association of International Petroleum Negotiators, and the Asia Shale Conference.

== Bibliography ==
=== Selected books ===
• 2001 The Law Review, ISBN 978-0887393778

• 2010 The Unmerciful Lawyer (Amazon Breakthrough Novel Award, Quarterfinalist), ISBN 978-1456356859

• 2011 International Energy Development, ISBN 978-1466439474

• 2013 The Camel Spider, ISBN 978-1480278523

• 2014 Shale Energy Development, ISBN 978-1499220605

• 2017 Construction Energy Development, ISBN 978-1546336716

• 2019 Strange Tales of World Travel (Best Travel Book of 2019, Finalist – Forward Magazine Indies; Best Travel Essay, Bronze Medalist – Independent Publisher Book Awards; Best Travel Book 2019, Honorable Mention – National Association of Travel Journalists), ISBN 978-1609521691

• 2026 Strange Tales of World Travel Vol. 2 (Silver Medal, Nonfiction Book Awards), ISBN 978-1-60952-215-5

=== Selected articles ===
• Publishing by U.S. Court of Appeals Judges: Before and After the Bork Hearings, 26 Journal of Legal Studies 371 (University of Chicago 1997)

• The Use of Quantity Terms to Improve Efficiency and Stability in International Gas Sales & Purchase Agreements (Energy Law Journal 2008)

• The Allocation of International Petroleum Licenses to National Oil Companies: Insights from the Coase Theorem (Energy Law Journal 2010)

• Mitigating the Resource Curse: A Proposal for a Microfinance and Educational Lending Royalty (Energy Law Journal 2011)

• The ABA Task Force Report on the Future of Legal Education: The Role of Adjunct Professors and Practical Teaching in the Energy Sector (Energy Law Journal 2014)

• How Can Governments Accelerate International Shale Development? (Energy Law Journal 2015)

• How Political Risk Associated with Climate Change is Impacting Pipeline Construction Agreements (Energy Law Journal 2019)

• Reducing Conflict and Risk: Why Parties Benefit from Using Enumerated Adjustment Clauses in Energy Construction and Services Agreements (Energy Law Journal 2021)

• Control, Fault, and Knock-For-Knock: A Guide to Selecting Indemnities in Energy Construction and Services Agreements (Energy Law Journal 2023)

• Contractual Approaches for Allocating the Risk of Productivity Loss in Energy Construction (Energy Law Journal 2025)

• The Role of Owners’ Counsel Concerning Requests for Proposals (Construction Law Journal 2025)
