= Abigail Swann =

Assistant Professor of Atmospheric Science and Ecology

Abigail L.S. Swann
- Education: Ph.D. University of California, Berkeley B.A. Columbia University
- Awards: Kavli Frontiers of Science Fellow, 2018 NSF CAREER Award, 2016 DISCCRS VI Scholar, 2011
- Scientific career
- Fields: atmospheric science, ecology
- Website: http://faculty.washington.edu/aswann/

Abigail L. S. Swann is an Associate Professor of Atmospheric Sciences and Ecology at the University of Washington. Her research group focuses on questions that examine the interactions between plants and climate.

== Early life and education ==
Swann grew up in Glen Ellen, CA and now resides in Seattle, WA. She received her bachelor's degree in earth and planetary sciences at the University of California, Berkeley. She then attended Columbia University for her master's degree in earth and environmental sciences. She returned to the University of California, Berkeley to complete her Ph.D. Her thesis advisor was Inez Fung.

She was also a competitive youth and collegiate sailor, winning the US Sailing Junior Women's Doublehanded Championship (Ida Lewis Trophy) and the collegiate sailing Robert Hobbes Sportsmanship Award.

== Career and research ==
Swann is an Associate Professor of Atmospheric Science and Ecology at the University of Washington. She uses climate models to simulate the way that plants influence Earth's climate. She has made a number of discoveries about how changes in the biosphere may influence our climate. For example, she predicts that the addition of deciduous forests in the Arctic may cause warming both by reducing the amount of area covered by reflective ice and by increasing the amount of water vapor in the atmosphere through evapotranspiration. While additional forests in mid latitudes across North America and Eurasia, may influence forests as far away as the tropics. Her group also examines how plants adapt to shifts in climate. For example, she found that plants use less water as CO_{2} increases, decreasing the severity of drought response and thus changing the way climate models should be built. Her findings on the influence of plants on the environment have been reported by Quanta magazine, Geographical Magazine, Inside Science, and multiple UW news publications.

Swann serves as a co-chair of the Biogeochemistry Working Group of the Community Earth System Model.

=== Notable publications ===
- Swann, A. L.; Fung, I. Y.; Levis, S.; Bonan, G. B.; Doney, S. C. (7 January 2010). "Changes in Arctic vegetation amplify high-latitude warming through the greenhouse effect". Proceedings of the National Academy of Sciences. 107 (4): 1295–1300. Bibcode:2010PNAS..107.1295S. doi:10.1073/pnas.0913846107. PMC 2803141. PMID 20080628.
- Swann, A. L. S.; Fung, I. Y.; Chiang, J. C. H. (21 December 2011). "Mid-latitude afforestation shifts general circulation and tropical precipitation". Proceedings of the National Academy of Sciences. 109 (3): 712–716. doi:10.1073/pnas.1116706108. PMC 3271929. PMID 22190490.
- Swann, Abigail L. S.; Hoffman, Forrest M.; Koven, Charles D.; Randerson, James T. (6 September 2016). "Plant responses to increasing CO2 reduce estimates of climate impacts on drought severity". Proceedings of the National Academy of Sciences. 113 (36): 10019–10024. Bibcode:2016PNAS..11310019S. doi:10.1073/pnas.1604581113. PMC 5018756. PMID 27573831.
- Swann, Abigail L.S.; Longo, Marcos; Knox, Ryan G.; Lee, Eunjee; Moorcroft, Paul R. (December 2015). "Future deforestation in the Amazon and consequences for South American climate". Agricultural and Forest Meteorology. 214–215: 12–24. Bibcode:2015AgFM..214...12S. doi:10.1016/j.agrformet.2015.07.006. hdl:1773/45559.
- Swann, Abigail L. S. (20 April 2018). "Plants and Drought in a Changing Climate". Current Climate Change Reports. 4 (2): 192–201. doi:10.1007/s40641-018-0097-y. S2CID 134287370.

== Awards and honors ==
- American Geophysical Union Global Environmental Change Early Career Award, 2019
- Ecological Society of America Early Career Fellow, 2019
- Science News 10 Scientists to Watch, 2019
- Jon C. Graff, Ph.D. Prize for Excellence in Science Communications, 2019
- Kavli Frontiers of Science Fellow, 2018
- National Science Foundation CAREER Faculty Early Career Development Award, 2016
- DISCCRS VI Scholar, 2011
- Giorgio Ruffolo Post-Doctoral fellow in Sustainability Science, 2010

== See also ==
- Greenhouse effect
- Afforestation
- Effects of climate change on plant biodiversity
