= William Gale =

William Gale may refer to:

- William Gale (painter) (1823–1909), British painter
- William G. Gale (1959– ), American economist
- William H. Gale (fl. 1860s), associate justice of the Colorado Territorial Supreme Court
- William Kendall Gale (1873–1935), English Methodist missionary in northern Madagascar
