= Galesburg (disambiguation) =

Galesburg is a city in Knox county, Illinois.

Galesburg is also the name of some places in the United States of America:

- Galesburg, Iowa
- Galesburg, Kansas
- Galesburg, Michigan
- Galesburg, Jasper County, Missouri
- Galesburg, Putnam County, Missouri
- Galesburg, North Dakota
