= Richard Gale =

Richard Gale may refer to:

- Richard Gale (British Army officer) (1896–1982), British soldier
- Richard Gale (Australian politician) (1834–1931), Member of the Western Australian Legislative Council
- Richard Pillsbury Gale (1900–1973), U.S. Representative from Minnesota
- Richard Gale (actor), British actor, known for The Flaxton Boys
- Rich Gale (born 1954), baseball player
- Richard M. Gale (1932 - 2015), American philosopher
