= Gael Murphy =

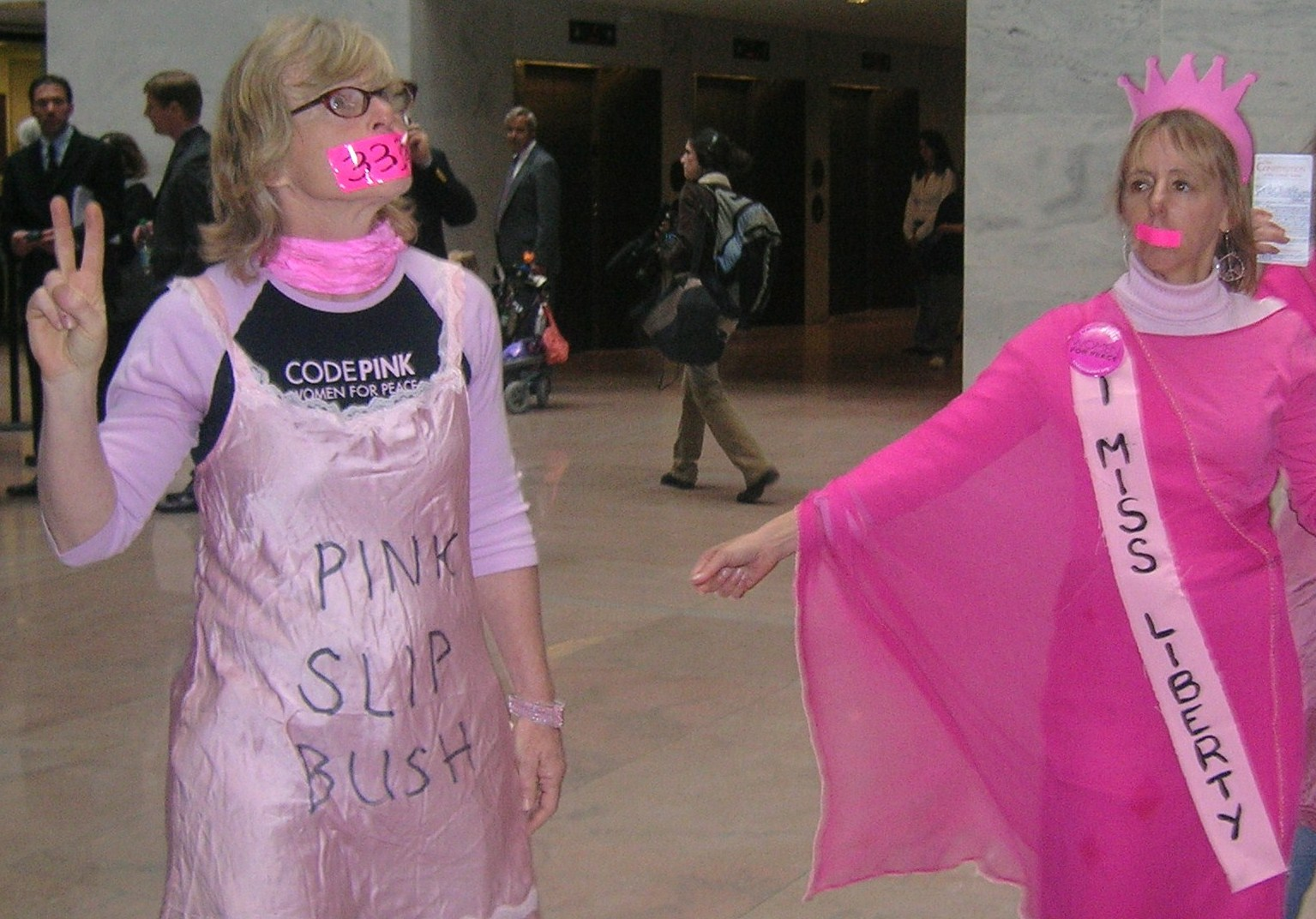
Gael Murphy, left, and Medea Benjamin at an April 2007 protest at the Senate Hart office building.

Gael Murphy, a resident of Washington, D.C., is an anti-war activist with Code Pink who has planned or participated in many of its high-profile protests and activities against the Iraq War.

Murphy worked in the Peace Corps and later as a public health officer in Zaire and Central America. She also was a foreign service officer and an aid contractor, gaining first hand experience of the mishandling of America's public policy.

In 2002 she helped coordinate Code Pink's Women's Peace Vigil held across from the White House. She heads up the group's D.C. office. She is also a member of its executive committee. A Salon writer who interviewed Murphy in 2008 described her as a "warmly robust, welcoming and intelligent presence with a firm handshake" who was tough enough for hard questioning.

In 2004 Murphy was the lead protester speaking out at a Senate hearing featuring then United States Secretary of Defense Donald Rumsfeld.

In 2004 she was arrested with fellow Code Pink founder Medea Benjamin inside The Republican National Convention. She also participated in protests against the 2008 Republican convention.

At an antiwar protest rally during United States President Barack Obama's Inauguration where protesters threw shoes at a balloon replica of George W. Bush, Murphy told protesters "Hold on to your shoes. The struggle is not over."

Murphy is among the activists featured in an anti-war documentary film, Finding Our Voices.
