= Gail Novinger =

American politician

Member of the U.S. House of Representatives from Missouri's 2nd district

Missouri House of Representatives
- Incumbent
- Assumed office 1975

Personal details
- Born: 1929 Eitel Ridge in western Adair County, Missouri, US
- Died: 2019 (aged 89–90) northwest of Kirksville, Missouri, US
- Resting place: Park View Memorial Gardens in Adair County, Missouri
- Party: Republican
- Spouse: Mary Frances Johnson
- Children: 4 (2 sons, 2 daughters)
- Occupation: farmer

Gail Novinger (February 7, 1929 - July 2, 2019) was an American Republican politician who served in the Missouri House of Representatives. He was born at Eitel Ridge in western Adair County, Missouri, and was educated at LaPlata High School and Northeast Missouri State University. On December 20, 1953, he married Mary Frances Johnson in Keytesville, Missouri.
