= Gail =

Gail may refer to:

== People ==
- Gail (given name), list of notable people with the given name
- Gail Platt, from British soap opera Coronation Street

=== Surname ===
- Jean-Baptiste Gail (1755–1829), French Hellenist scholar
- Marzieh Gail (1908–1993), American and Iranian Bahá'i writer and translator
- Max Gail (born 1943), American actor
- Sophie Gail (1775–1819), French singer and composer

== Places ==
Austria

- Gail (river), a river in Austria
- Gailbach (Drava), a mountain creek in Austria

United States

- Gail, Texas
- Gail Lake Township, Minnesota

== Other uses ==
- Gail's, British cafe and bakery chain
- GAIL, Gas Authority of India Limited
- GAIL: GNOME Accessibility Implementation Library – implements the computing accessibility interfaces defined by the GNOME Accessibility Toolkit (ATK)
- Gail Valley dialect, a Slovene dialect in Central Europe
- Gail (1979 film), an Australian television film
- Gail (2026 film), a Canadian documentary film
- Gail (What We Do in the Shadows), an episode of the TV series What We Do in the Shadows

== See also ==
- Gael (given name)
- Gale (disambiguation)
- Gayle (disambiguation)
