= Georg Freiherr von Gayl =

Prussian officer and General

- Born: 25 February 1850; Berlin, Kingdom of Prussia
- Died: 3 May 1927 (aged 77); Stolp, Germany
- Relatives: Egon Freiherr von Gayl; Franz Freiherr von Gayl
- Military career
- Allegiance: German Empire
- Branch: Heer
- Service years: 1869–1919
- Rank: General of Infantry
- Commands: 10. Ersatz-Division; 13. Landwehr-Division
- Conflicts: Franco-Prussian War; Boxer Rebellion; World War I
- Awards: Pour le Mérite

Georg Freiherr von Gayl (25 February 1850, Berlin – 3 May 1927) was a Prussian officer, and General during World War I. He was a recipient of Pour le Mérite.

== Awards ==
- Iron Cross of 1870, 2nd class
- Order of the Red Eagle, 2nd class with Oak Leaves and Swords (1901)
- Pour le Mérite (8 May 1918)
