= Iain Gale =

Journalist and author

- Born: Iain Gale; 1959 (age 66–67); London, England
- Occupations: Writer, editor, art critic
- Children: 3
- Writing career
- Genres: Historical novel, historical fiction

Iain Gale is a journalist and author born in 1959, who writes military novels. His book Four Days in June, about the Battle of Waterloo, was well received and acclaimed by Bernard Cornwell. He is also the writer of eleven non-fiction books.

== Biography and career ==
Iain Gale was born in 1959 in central London, to Scottish parents. His father was the political cartoonist, George Gale. He grew up in Ham, near Richmond, London, and was educated at St Paul's School, London, and the University of Edinburgh. He was deputy art critic of The Independent from 1990 to 1996, and art critic for Scotland on Sunday for 12 years from 1996 to 2008. He is currently the editor of the National Trust for Scotland magazine. He is married to an Edinburgh GP: between them they have six children. They divide their time between Edinburgh and Fife.

== Works ==
Following a series of non-fiction books, Gale published his first novel, the well received Four Days in June, about the Battle of Waterloo, in 2006. He followed this with a series of three books featuring the character Jack Steel, set during the campaigns of the Duke of Marlborough. In 2009 he published Alamein, about the Second Battle of El Alamein, which like Four Days in June was based largely on the experiences of real-life participants. More recently he has published two novels in a projected Second World War series featuring the character Peter Lamb and his men; and another four in a Napoleonic Wars series featuring a band of roguish scouting officers led by Captain James Keane.

== Bibliography ==
=== Non-fiction ===
- Gale, Iain (1985). The Flying Hammer: An Insider's Collection of Salesroom Howlers. London: Elm Tree. ISBN 0-241-11578-7. OCLC 16404450.
- Gale, Iain; Irvine, Susan (1987). Laura Ashley Style. New York: Harmony. OCLC 16276208.
- Gale, Iain; Waugh, Evelyn (1990). Waugh's World: a guide to the novels of Evelyn Waugh. London: Sidgwick & Jackson. ISBN 0-283-99835-0. OCLC 24937652.
- Parsons, Thomas; Gale, Iain (1992). Post-impressionism: the rise of modern art. London: Studio. ISBN 1-85170-861-8. OCLC 27464087. Italian translation: Da Van Gogh a Picasso: la nascita dell'arte contemporanea dal postimpressionismo all'espressionismo. Florence: Giunti. 2000. ISBN 88-09018478.
- Gale, Iain (1992). Sisley. The Master Painters. London: Studio. ISBN 1-85170-857-X. OCLC 27976902.
- Gale, Iain; Bryant, Richard (1993). Living Museums. Boston: Little, Brown & Co. ISBN 0-8212-1963-4. OCLC 27431797.
- Gale, Iain (1994). Corot. The Master Painters. London: Studio. ISBN 1-85170-961-4. OCLC 443426804. (on Jean-Baptiste-Camille Corot)
- Gale, Iain (1996). Ray Richardson: One Man on a Trip. London: Beaux Arts. OCLC 35208410.
- Gale, Iain (1996). Arthur Melville. Edinburgh: Atelier. ISBN 1-873830-04-1. OCLC 38113629.

=== Fiction ===
- Gale, Iain (2006). Four Days in June: a battle lost, a battle won, June 1815. London: HarperCollins. ISBN 0-00-720103-6. OCLC 62760618.
- Gale, Iain (2009). Alamein: The Turning Point of World War Two. London: HarperCollins. ISBN 978-0-00-727867-1. OCLC 373477696.

==== Series ====
Jack Steel

- Gale, Iain (2007). Man of Honour. London: HarperCollins. ISBN 978-0-00-720106-8. OCLC 85828634.
- Gale, Iain (2008). Rules of War. London: HarperCollins. ISBN 978-0-00-725355-5. OCLC 183915237.
- Gale, Iain (2009). Brothers in Arms. London: HarperCollins. ISBN 978-0-00-725357-9. OCLC 298596791.

Peter Lamb

- Gale, Iain (2011). The Black Jackals. London: HarperCollins. ISBN 978-0-00-727864-0. OCLC 703349371.
- Gale, Iain (2012). Jackals' Revenge. London: HarperCollins. ISBN 978-0-00-727870-1. OCLC 760289666.

Keane

- Gale, Iain (2013). Keane's Company. London: Heron Books. ISBN 978-1-78087-362-6. OCLC 822959953.
- Gale, Iain (2014). Keane's Challenge. London: Heron Books. ISBN 978-1-78087-364-0. OCLC 870426313.
- Gale, Iain (2015). Keane's Charge. London: Heron Books. ISBN 978-1-84866-480-7. OCLC 908129325.
- Gale, Iain (2016). Conspiracy. London: Heron Books. ISBN 978-1-84866-484-5. OCLC 948971494.
