= Gael (disambiguation) =

The Gaels are a European ethnolinguistic group.

Gael or Gaels may also refer to:

== People ==
- Gaël (given name), a list of people with the personal name
- Anna Gaël, stage name of Hungarian actress Anna Thynn, Marchioness of Bath (born 1943)
- Barent Gael (c. 1630–1698), Dutch landscape painter
- Josseline Gaël (1917–1995), French film actress born Jeannine Augustine Jeanne Blanleuil
- Gael (footballer), Equatoguinean footballer

== Sports ==
- Clarington Green Gaels, lacrosse team in Ontario, Canada
- Iona Gaels, athletic teams of Iona University in New York
- Queen's Golden Gaels, athletic teams of Queen's University at Kingston in Ontario, Canada
- Saint Mary's Gaels, athletic teams of Saint Mary's College of California
- Trinity Gaels, a Gaelic games club in the Republic of Ireland

== Other uses ==
- Gaël, a commune in Brittany, France
  - Gael Airfield, an abandoned World War II military airfield near the commune
- Gael (magazine), a monthly women's magazine in Belgium
- Iona Gaels, the athletics teams of Iona College, in New Rochelle, New York
- PS Gael (1867), a passenger paddle steamer
- "The Gael", a 1990 piece of music by Dougie MacLean

== See also ==
- Ralph de Gael (before 1042–c. 1096), Earl of East Anglia and Lord of Gaël and Montfort, leader of the last serious revolt against William the Conqueror
