= Gayle (surname) =

Gayle is a surname. Notable people with the surname include:

- Charles Gayle (1939–2023), American jazz musician
- Chris Gayle (born 1979), West Indian cricketer
- Crystal Gayle (born 1951), Country and pop singer
- Dwight Gayle (born 1990), English footballer
- Gordon D. Gayle (1917–2013), American brigadier general and historian
- Helene D. Gayle (born 1955), American physician
- Howard Gayle (born 1958), English footballer
- John Gayle (Alabama politician) (1792–1859), American politician from Alabama
- John Gayle (footballer) (born 1964), English footballer
- Kavan Gayle, Jamaican politician
- Marcus Gayle (born 1970), English-born Jamaican footballer
- Michelle Gayle (born 1971), English actress and singer
- Mike Gayle (born 1970), British author and freelance journalist
- Peta-Gaye Gayle (born 1979), Jamaican sprinter
- Roddy Gayle Jr. (born 2003), American basketball player
- Sarah Ann Haynsworth Gayle (1804–1835), diarist; wife of John
- Shaun Gayle (born 1962), American football player
- Tajay Gayle (born 1996), Jamaican long jumper
- W. A. Gayle (1896–1965), American politician
- William D. Gayle (1859–1936), American businessman and politician
