= Tom Gale =

Tom Gale may refer to:

- Tom Gale (designer) (born 1943), American automobile designer
- Tom Gale (footballer) (1912–1986), Australian rules footballer
- Tom Gale (high jumper) (born 1998), English high jumper
