= Allergist =

Physician trained to manage and treat allergic diseases

An allergist is a physician specially trained to manage and treat allergies, asthma and the other allergic diseases. They may also be called immunologists.

== Becoming an allergist ==
Becoming an allergist/immunologist requires completion of at least nine years of training. After completing medical school and graduating with a medical degree, a physician will then undergo three years of training in internal medicine (to become an internist) or pediatrics (to become a pediatrician). Once physicians have finished training in one of these specialties, they must pass the exam of either the American Board of Pediatrics (ABP) or the American Board of Internal Medicine (ABIM). Internists or pediatricians who wish to focus on the sub-specialty of allergy-immunology then complete at least an additional two years of study, called a fellowship, in an allergy/immunology training program.

Allergist/immunologists who are listed as ABAI-certified have successfully passed the certifying examination of the American Board of Allergy and Immunology (ABAI), following their fellowship. In the United States physicians who hold certification by the American Board of Allergy and Immunology (ABAI) have successfully completed an accredited educational program and an evaluation process, including a secure, proctored examination to demonstrate the knowledge, skills, and experience to the provision of patient care in allergy and immunology.

In the United Kingdom, allergy is a subspecialty of general medicine or pediatrics. After obtaining postgraduate exams (MRCP or MRCPCH respectively) a doctor works for several years as a specialist registrar before qualifying for the General Medical Council specialist register. Allergy services may also be delivered by immunologists.

== Absence of allergists ==
A 2003 Royal College of Physicians report presented a case for improvement of what were felt to be inadequate allergy services in the UK. In 2006, the House of Lords convened a subcommittee that reported in 2007. It concluded likewise that allergy services were insufficient to deal with what the Lords referred to as an "allergy epidemic" and its social cost; it made several other recommendations.

The American Academy of Allergy, Asthma & Immunology (AAAAI) has an international physician referral directory of allergist/immunologist members of the organization here.
