= Gayle (given name) =

Unisex given name

- Gender: Unisex
- Language: Hebrew; Anglo-Saxon

Origin
- Meaning: a father's joy

Other names
- Variant forms: Gail; Gale
- Derived: Abigail

Gayle (/ˈɡeɪl/ GAYL) is a variant spelling of Gail, a short form of the name Abigail.

Abigail is a feminine English name with Hebrew origins, meaning "my father is joy." In the Old Testament Abigail was King David's third wife, described as 'good in discretion and beautiful in form'. The name is used in modern English and was a popular baby's name during the 1950s and 1960s.

Gayle may occasionally be used as a masculine name.

== People with the given name Gayle ==
- Taylor Gayle Rutherford (known mononymously as GAYLE) (born 2004), American pop rock singer
- Gayle Benson (born 1947), American businesswoman
- Gayle Fulks (born 1985), American basketball coach
- Gayle King (born 1954), American television personality and journalist
- Gayle McCormick (1948–2016), American singer, member of the band Smith
- Gayle Pezzo, American politician
- Gayle Rankin, Scottish actress
- Gayle Rubin (born 1949), American anthropologist and activist
- Gayle Ruzicka, American politician and activist

== Fictional characters ==
- Gayle Gossip, a character in Ninjago
