= Abbey (disambiguation) =

Abbey in itself denotes the Christian monastic community and its buildings, that is presided over by an abbot.

== People ==
- Abbey (surname)
- Abbey (given name)

== Places ==
=== Populated places ===
- Abbey (Barking and Dagenham ward), Greater London, England
- Abbey (County Clare Civil Parish), Munster, Ireland
- Abbey (Derby ward), England
- Abbey, Devon, village in England
- Abbey (Leicester ward), England
- Abbey (Lincoln ward), England
- Abbey (Merton ward), Greater London, England
- Abbey (Nuneaton and Bedworth ward), Warwickshire, England
- Abbey (Reading ward), Berkshire, England
- Abbey, Renfrewshire, civil parish in Scotland
- Abbey (Rushcliffe ward), Nottinghamshire, England
- Abbey (Sandwell ward), West Midlands, England
- Abbey, Saskatchewan, town in Canada
- Abbey, Western Australia, suburb of Busselton city
- Westminster Abbey (UK Parliament constituency), Inner London, England; a former constituency, sometimes known as Abbey

=== Facilities and structures ===
- The Abbey, Annandale, a heritage home in Sydney, Australia
- The Abbey, Sutton Courtenay, a medieval manor house in Oxfordshire, England
- Abbey Road, London, England; thoroughfare through Camden and Westminster; made famous by the cover of the Beatles' album Abbey Road, recorded at Abbey Road Studios
- Abbey Stadium, homeground for Cambridge United F.C.
- The Abbey (Daytona Beach, Florida), a historic site in the US
- Fonthill Abbey (Beckford's Folly), a Gothic Revival country house in Fonthill Gifford, Wiltshire, England; it was never an actual abbey
- Woburn Abbey, near Woburn, Bedfordshire, England, the seat of the dukes of Bedford and the location of the Woburn Safari Park

=== Rivers ===
- Abbey River, an artificial river (leat) established since the 11th century in Chertsey, Surrey, England

== Organizations and companies ==
- The Abbey (club), a gay bar and nightclub in West Hollywood, California
- Abbey (coachbuilder), an English car body builder of the 1930s
- Abbey National, a former British bank, part of the Spanish banking group, Grupo Santander
- The Abbey Theatre, a Dublin theatre opened in 1904

== Entertainment and media ==
=== Television ===
- The Abbey (1995 TV series), a 1995 BBC TV documentary film on Westminster Abbey
- The Abbey, Australian version of The Monastery (TV series)
- The Abbey (2007 TV series), 2007 ITV drama

=== Games ===
- Mystery of the Abbey, a board game
- Murder in the Abbey, a video game

=== Fictional abbeys ===
- Rabelais' Abbey of Thélème
- Downton Abbey
- Jane Austen's Northanger Abbey
- Redwall Abbey

=== Other media ===
- The Abbey (novel), science-fiction novel by the Romanian author Dan Doboș

== Other uses ==
- Abbey (1853), Australian ship
- Abbey (automobile), a short-lived British friction-drive car made by the defunct Abbey Auto Engineering Co. Ltd.

== See also ==
- L' Abeye, Belgium
- Abby (disambiguation)
- Abey (name)
