= List of shipwrecks in February 1868 =

The list of shipwrecks in February 1868 includes ships sunk, foundered, grounded, or otherwise lost during February 1868.

== 1 February ==
List of shipwrecks: 1 February 1868
Ship	State	Description
City of Melbourne	United Kingdom	The clipper caught fire at Port Phillip, Victoria and was scuttled. She was refloated on 4 February. Subsequently repaired and returned to service.
Dependent	United Kingdom	The ship collided with John Paxton (United Kingdom) and sank off the coast of Monmouthshire with the loss of a crew member
Edwin	United States	The barque was driven ashore at the Mumbles, Glamorgan, United Kingdom. She was refloated and towed in to Swansea, Glamorgan.
Elinor	United Kingdom	The brigantine was driven ashore at Sandsend, Yorkshire. She was refloated but had to be beached.
Floen	Norway	The barque was driven ashore at the Mumbles. She was on a voyage from Swansea, Glamorgan to Cuba.
Flying Fish	United Kingdom	The smack struck the wreck of Lord Clyde (United Kingdom) and sank off Great Yarmouth, Norfolk. Her crew survived.
Harriet	United Kingdom	The schooner was driven ashore in Deadman's Bay, Devon. She was on a voyage from Newcastle upon Tyne, Northumberland to the Charente. She was refloated with assistance from the tug Secret (United Kingdom) and taken in to Sutton Pool.
Jessie	United Kingdom	The ship sank at East Point, Monmouthshire. She was on a voyage from Cork to Newport, Monmouthshire. She was refloated on 10 February and towed in to Newport for repairs.
John and William	United Kingdom	The ship was driven ashore and wrecked at Amlwch, Anglesey. Shew as on a voyage from Dublin to Bangor, Caernarfonshire.
Kyanite	United Kingdom	The barque was driven ashore at Spurn Point, Yorkshire. Her crew took to a boat, but were blown out to sea. They got onto the New Sand Float, from where they were rescued. She was on a voyage from Lyme Regis, Dorset to Hull, Yorkshire. Kyanite was refloated on 8 February and taken in to Grimsby Lincolnshire.
Mary and Grace	United Kingdom	The schooner ran aground on the West Hoyle Bank, in Liverpool Bay. Her crew were rescued by the Point of Ayr Lifeboat. She was on a voyage from Bangor, Caernarfonshire to Dublin.
Melby	United Kingdom	The brig collided with another vessel. She was taken in tow by two tugs but drove ashore at Lowestoft, Suffolk and was wrecked. Her crew were rescued. She was on a voyage from South Shields, County Durham to London.
Mistley	United Kingdom	The fishing smack was abandoned on the Dog Head Sands, in the North Sea off the coast of Lincolnshire.
Parana	United Kingdom	The steamship ran aground in the River Thames at Blackwall, Middlesex. She was on a voyage from the Mediterranean to London.

== 2 February ==
List of shipwrecks: 2 February 1868
Ship	State	Description
Amazon	United Kingdom	The ship was driven ashore near Mazagan, Morocco and was abandoned. She was on a voyage from London to Mazagan.
Glendevon	United Kingdom	The ship was driven ashore in the Bay of Stiff. She was on a voyage from Brăila, Ottoman Empire to Falmouth, Cornwall. She had become a wreck by 6 February.
Marie Emilie	United Kingdom	The brig sprang a leak and was abandoned in the North Sea off Flamborough Head, East Riding of Yorkshire. Her crew were rescued. She was on a voyage from Ramsgate, Kent to Seaham, County Durham.
Mary and Grace	United Kingdom	The schooner ran aground on the West Hoyle Bank, in Liverpool Bay. Her crew were rescued by the Point of Ayr Lifeboat. She was on a voyage from Dublin to Bangor.
Otago	(United Kingdom of Great Britain and Ireland)	The schooner was wrecked south of Oamaru. Her crew were rescued.
Star of Tasmania	United Kingdom	The ship was wrecked at Oamaru with the loss of four lives.
Water Nymph	United Kingdom	The ship was wrecked at Oamaru.
William Uriskin	(United Kingdom of Great Britain and Ireland) New Zealand	The steamship was wrecked at Oamaru with the loss of two lives.

== 3 February ==
List of shipwrecks: 3 February 1868
Ship	State	Description
Alpha	United Kingdom	The ship sprang a leak and was abandoned in the North Sea. Her three crew were rescued by the brig Adra (Sweden).
Azorean	United Kingdom	The brig sank on the Girdler Sand. Her crew were rescued by a lugger. She was on a voyage from London to Swansea, Glamorgan
Breeze	(United Kingdom of Great Britain and Ireland) New Zealand	The schooner went ashore and was wrecked at Le Bons Bay, Banks Peninsula, New Zealand, during the Great storm of 1868, a cyclone which swept much of the country. All hands were saved.
Circassian	United Kingdom	The barque was driven ashore at Rodosto, Ottoman Empire. She was on a voyage from Varna, Ottoman Empire to an English port. She was a total loss.
Coyattin	Prussia	A mutiny occurred on board the barque. Her coolies murdered the ship's crew. Coyattin was on a voyage from "Cowag" to Arequipa, Peru. The coolies attempted to sail her to China, but it was presumed she was subsequently wrecked.
Echunga	United Kingdom	The ship was wrecked at Napier, New Zealand, during the Great storm of 1868, a cyclone which swept much of the country. All hands were saved.
Fortune	(United Kingdom of Great Britain and Ireland) New Zealand	The 160-ton brig was wrecked 10 miles (16 km) south of Hokianga, New Zealand, during the Great storm of 1868, a cyclone which swept much of the country. Only one of the crew of eight was saved.
Hoogezand	Hamburg	The ship ran aground on the Great Vogelsand, in the North Sea. Her crew were rescued by a pilot schooner. She was on a voyage from London, United Kingdom to Harburg.
Otago	(United Kingdom of Great Britain and Ireland) New Zealand	The 26-ton ketch was wrecked 8 miles (13 km) north of Oamaru, New Zealand, during the Great storm of 1868, a cyclone which swept much of the country. All hands were saved.
Sea Bird	(United Kingdom of Great Britain and Ireland) New Zealand	The schooner was wrecked at Haumuri Bluff, New Zealand, during the Great storm of 1868, a cyclone which swept much of the country. All hands were saved.
Star of Tasmania	(United Kingdom of Great Britain and Ireland) Tasmania	The ship was wrecked at Oamaru, New Zealand, during the Great storm of 1868, a cyclone which swept much of the country. Five lives were lost.
Symmetry	United Kingdom	The ship caught fire at Oran, Algeria and was scuttled.
Tugela	United Kingdom	The ship was wrecked on the coast of the Natal Colony. Her crew were rescued.
Water Nymph	(United Kingdom of Great Britain and Ireland) New Zealand	The schooner was wrecked at Oamaru, New Zealand, during the Great storm of 1868, a cyclone which swept much of the country. All hands were saved.

== 4 February ==
List of shipwrecks: 4 February 1868
Ship	State	Description
Challenge	(United Kingdom of Great Britain and Ireland) New Zealand	The ketch went ashore and was wrecked at Le Bons Bay, Banks Peninsula, New Zealand, during the Great storm of 1868, a cyclone which swept much of the country.
Fowler	United Kingdom	The brig was abandoned off the Well Bank, in the North Sea. Her crew were rescued. She was on a voyage from London to Hartlepool, County Durham.
Industry	United Kingdom	The barque was abandoned in the North Sea. Her crew were rescued by Visschers (Netherlands). She was on a voyage from Havre de Grâce, Seine-Inférieure, France to South Shields, County Durham. The derelict Industry was driven ashore at Lemvig, Norway on 7 February.
Josephine	France	The schooner foundered in the North Sea. Her crew were rescued by the smack Joseph and Anne (United Kingdom).
Rambler	United Kingdom	The ship was driven ashore at "Cunslyon". She was on a voyage from Dumfries to Galway.
Riga	United Kingdom	The brig foundered in the North Sea. Her crew were rescued by the smack Rover's Bride (United Kingdom). Riga was on a voyage from Sunderland, County Durham to London.
Stettin	United Kingdom	The steamship was driven ashore by ice near Pillau, Prussia.
William Miskin	(United Kingdom of Great Britain and Ireland) New Zealand	The 142-ton screw steamer was wrecked at Timaru, New Zealand, during the Great storm of 1868, a cyclone which swept much of the country. One crewman drowned.
Unnamed	United Kingdom	The barque foundered in the Bristol Channel off Clevedon, Somerset.

== 5 February ==
List of shipwrecks: 5 February 1868
Ship	State	Description
Lessborough	United Kingdom	The ship was wrecked on Sark, Channel Islands.
Nederland	Netherlands	The ship collided with Kortenaar (Netherlands) and was run ashore at Rotterdam, South Holland.
Riga	United Kingdom	The brig foundered in the North Sea off the Newarp Lightship ( Trinity House). Her crew were rescued. She was on a voyage from Sunderland, County Durham to London.
Smyrna	United Kingdom	The steamship departed from Kristiansand, Norway for Hull, Yorkshire. Subsequently foundered off Skagen, Denmark on or about 9 February with the loss of all hands.
Thomas	United Kingdom	The schooner was abandoned in the North Sea 160 nautical miles (300 km) off Spurn Point, Yorkshire. Her crew were rescued. She was on a voyage from London to Sunderland.

== 6 February ==
List of shipwrecks: 6 February 1868
Ship	State	Description
Admiral	United Kingdom	The ship was driven ashore and wrecked on Tybee Island, Georgia, United States. She was on a voyage from Savannah, Georgia to Liverpool, Lancashire. She was refloated.
Eleanor	United Kingdom	The schooner was run ashore at "Landsend", Yorkshire and was wrecked.
George Robinson	United Kingdom	The ship sank off Orfordness, Suffolk. She was on a voyage from Sunderland, County Durham to London.
Mantura	United Kingdom	The ship was wrecked at the mouth of the River Mersey. She was on a voyage from São Miguel Island, Azores to Liverpool.
Marie	Denmark	The koff was wrecked on Hirsholmene. Her crew were rescued She was on a voyage from Præstø to Leith, Lothian, United Kingdom.
Mary and Ann	United Kingdom	The snow foundered in the North Sea. Her crew were rescued. She was on a voyage from Seaham, County Durham to London.
Seagull	United Kingdom	The paddle steamer collided with the paddle steamer Swan (United Kingdom) and sank off Happisburgh, Norfolk with the loss of one of the 23 people on board. Seagull was on a voyage from Hull, Yorkshire to Rotterdam, South Holland, Netherlands.
Venise	United Kingdom	The brig struck the Ploughseat Rocks, on the coast of Northumberland and sank. Her crew were rescued.
Unnamed	France	The schooner foundered off Bolt Head, Devon, United Kingdom.

== 7 February ==
List of shipwrecks: 7 February 1868
Ship	State	Description
Lizzie F. Choate	United States	The cargo schooner was lost, apparently swamped and waterlogged, in the Gulf Stream while on the passage from New York City to Antigua. Her Captain and 2 crewmen died. Survivors taken off by brig J. S. Wright (United Kingdom) 5 days later.

== 8 February ==
List of shipwrecks: 8 February 1868
Ship	State	Description
Concordia	Rostock	The ship was driven ashore on Møn, Denmark, Her crew were rescued. She was on a voyage from Hartlepool, County Durham, United Kingdom to Kiel, Prussia.
Fox	United Kingdom	The sloop sank on the Ferrier Sand, in the North Sea off the coast of Norfolk. Her crew were rescued. She was refloated on 11 February and towed in to King's Lynn, Norfolk.
Jane	United Kingdom	The schooner was wrecked near Skerries, County Dublin with the loss of four lives.
John Watt	United States	The ship caught fire at Calicut, India and was scuttled. She was on a voyage from South Shields, County Durham to Bombay, India. She was refloated on 14 February.
Marietta	France	The ship was wrecked at Hope Cove, Devon, United Kingdom. She was on a voyage from Le Croisic, Loire-Inférieure to Plymouth, Devon.
Providence	United Kingdom	The ship struck a sunken wreck in the English Channel off Dungeness. She consequently foundered off Beachy Head, Sussex. Her crew were rescued by Jeune Emile (France). Providence was on a voyage from London to Dieppe, Seine-Inférieure, France.

== 9 February ==
List of shipwrecks: 9 February 1868
Ship	State	Description
Admiral Jarvis	United Kingdom	The ship ran aground on the Sizewell Bank, in the North Sea off the coast of Suffolk. She was on a voyage from Hartlepool, County Durham to London. She was refloated and taken in to Woodbridge, Suffolk in a leaky condition.
Æneas	United Kingdom	The brigantine was wrecked on the Bolton Rocks, near Waterford. She was on a voyage from Waterford to Wexford.
Bessy	Newfoundland Colony	The ship was driven ashore at Saint John's. She was on a voyage from Saint John's to Havana, Cuba. She was consequently condemned.
Eagle Wing	United Kingdom	The schooner collided with HMS Britannia (Royal Navy) on being launched at Dartmouth, Devon and was severely damaged.
Ella	United Kingdom	The brig was wrecked on Jardinelle's Reef, south of Cuba. Five crew were rescued by Dolphin (United Kingdom). Ella was on a voyage from Cienfuegos, Cuba to Boston, Massachusetts, United States.
Esmerelda	United Kingdom	The ship foundered in the Pacific Ocean. Her crew survived. She was on a voyage from Greenock, Renfrewshire to Melbourne, Victoria.
Jane	United Kingdom	The schooner struck Carr's Rock, off the Giant's Causeway, County Antrim and sank with the loss of three of her four crew. She was on a voyage from Portrush, County Antrim to Cardiff, Glamorgan.
Lizzie F. Choate	United States	The ship foundered with the loss of three of her five crew. Survivors were rescued by J. and G. Wright (United States). Lizzie F. Choate was on a voyage from New York to Antigua.
Star	United Kingdom	The barque was driven ashore. She was on a voyage from Sunderland to Alexandria, Egypt. She was refloated and taken in to Newhaven, Sussex in a leaky condition.
Unnamed	United Kingdom	The steamship was wrecked at Buckhaven Fife. She was on a voyage from Largo, Fife to Leith, Lothian.

== 10 February ==
List of shipwrecks: 10 February 1868
Ship	State	Description
Eleanor	United Kingdom	The brig was damaged by fire at Wells-next-the-Sea, Norfolk.
Elizabeth Wright	United Kingdom	The schooner was driven ashore and wrecked at Peterhead, Aberdeenshire. She was on a voyage from Sunderland, County Durham to Macduff, Aberdeenshire.
Jane and Margaret	United Kingdom	The brig ran aground on the Sizewell Bank, in the North Sea off the coast of Suffolk. She floated off and sank 2 nautical miles (3.7 km) off Aldeburgh, Suffolk. Her crew were rescued by the yawl Anna Maria (United Kingdom). Jane and Margaret was on a voyage from Sunderland, County Durham to London.
Kate Agnes	Canada	The ship was driven ashore at Irvine, Ayrshire, United Kingdom. In two trips, fourteen people on board were rescued by the Irvine Lifeboat Pringle Kidd; the rest reached shore in a boat. She was on a voyage from Dublin to Troon, Ayrshire.
Kennett	United Kingdom	The ship was driven ashore at Cape Conine, County Waterford. She was refloated.
Mary	United Kingdom	The schooner was driven ashore and wrecked at Formby, Lancashire. Her crew got on board the Formby Lightship ( Trinity House). Mary was on a voyage from Runcorn, Cheshire to the River Tyne. She was refloated on 17 February and taken in to Liverpool, Lancashire.
Mary	United Kingdom	The schooner ran aground at the mouth of the River Mersey. She was on a voyage from Liverpool to Charlestown, Cornwall. She was refloated and put back to Liverpool.
Schwalbe	Prussia	The ship was wrecked at Wyk auf Föhr. She was on a voyage from Emden to London, United Kingdom.

== 11 February ==
List of shipwrecks: 11 February 1868
Ship	State	Description
Amanda Guion	United Kingdom	The brigantine was abandoned in the Atlantic Ocean with the loss of six of her nine crew. Survivors were rescued by the full-rigged ship Huntress (United Kingdom).
Auria	United Kingdom	The ship ran aground on the West Hoyle Bank, in Liverpool Bay. She was on a voyage from Newport, Monmouthshire to Liverpool, Lancashire. She was refloated and taken in to Liverpool in a sinking condition.
Chin Chin	United Kingdom	The schooner foundered off Rodrigues. Her crew were rescued.
Croisic	France	The schooner was driven ashore at Dartmouth, Devon, United Kingdom.
Kate	United Kingdom	The ship was driven ashore. She was on a voyage from Inverness to Liverpool. She was refloated and put back to Inverness.
Mary Sanders	United Kingdom	The ship ran aground in the Queen's Channel and was beached. She was on a voyage from Par, Cornwall to Runcorn, Cheshire. She was refloated on 16 January and towed in to Runcorn.
Renata	United Kingdom	The ship ran aground on the Goodwin Sands, Kent. She was on a voyage from South Shields, County Durham to Callao, Peru. She was refloated the next day, and put in to London in a leaky condition.

== 12 February ==
List of shipwrecks: 12 February 1868
Ship	State	Description
Beta	United Kingdom	The steamship ran aground on the Nore.
Chevalier	United Kingdom	The ship ran aground on the Goodwin Sands, Kent. She was on a voyage from South Shields, County Durham to Surabaya, Netherlands East Indies. She was refloated and taken in to The Downs.
Clara and Jane, or Clara and Jenny	United Kingdom	The brig was wrecked on Borkum, Prussia. Her crew were rescued. She was on a voyage from London to West Hartlepool, County Durham.
Electric	United Kingdom	The tug was driven ashore near Aden with the loss of one life. She was refloated.
Frank	United Kingdom	The brig was driven ashore and wrecked 2 nautical miles (3.7 km) east of Gibraltar. Her crew were rescued. She was on a voyage from Licata, Sicily, Italy to London.
Franziska	Flag unknown	The ship was wrecked on the west coast of Jutland.
Hercules	United Kingdom	The schooner was abandoned in the Dogger Bank. Her six crew were rescued by a galiot. She was on a voyage from Sunderland, County Durham to Arbroath, Forfarshire.
Inverrugie	United Kingdom	The ship was wrecked at the mouth of the Rio Grande do Norte.
Margaret	(United Kingdom of Great Britain and Ireland) Gibraltar	The schooner was driven ashore and wrecked at Gibraltar.
Meteor	Rostock	The brig was wrecked 8 nautical miles (15 km) east of Gibraltar with the loss of four of her crew. She was on a voyage form Alexandria, Egypt to Falmouth, Cornwall, United Kingdom.
Solitario	Italy	The brig was driven ashore at Gibraltar with the loss of six of her ten crew. She subsequently became a wreck.
Virginia	United States	The ship was wrecked at Bluefields, Nicaragua. Her crew were rescued. She was on a voyage from Colón, United States of Colombia to Minatitlán, Mexico.

== 13 February ==
List of shipwrecks: 13 February 1868
Ship	State	Description
Comorn	United Kingdom	The ship foundered in the North Sea with the loss of all hands. She was on a voyage from an English port to Ostend, West Flanders, Belgium.
Demerara	United Kingdom	The ship was driven ashore at Sandgate, Kent. She was on a voyage from London to Greenock, Renfrewshire. She was refloated with the assistance of two tugs and towed in to Dover, Kent.
Javadette	Netherlands	The brigantine ran aground at Berbice, British Guiana. She was on a voyage from Berbice to London. She was refloated and resumed her voyage, but put in to Trinidad on 21 February in a leaky condition.

== 14 February ==
List of shipwrecks: 14 February 1868
Ship	State	Description
Comorn	United Kingdom	The schooner foundered in the North Sea with the loss of all hands.
Jane and Ellen	United Kingdom	The ship was run into by the brig Marwood (United Kingdom) off Staithes, Yorkshire and was abandoned by all but her captain, her crew getting on board Marwood. Jane and Ellen was on a voyage from Scarborough, Yorkshire to Seaham, County Durham. She was towed in to Whitby, Yorkshire.
Mary Scott	United Kingdom	The sloop was driven ashore at Crail, Fife in a capsized condition and was wrecked.
Rose	United Kingdom	The schooner ran aground at Boulmer, Northumberland. She was on a voyage from London to Arbroath, Forfarshire. She was refloated the next day and taken in to Warkworth, Northumberland.

== 15 February ==
List of shipwrecks: 15 February 1868
Ship	State	Description
Abbey	(United Kingdom of Great Britain and Ireland) New South Wales	The wooden brigantine was wrecked three miles north of Crowdy Head in a gale.
Aurora	Canada	The steamship sank at Lachine, Quebec.
Doris	Rostock	The schooner was abandoned in the North Sea 90 nautical miles (170 km) east north east of Spurn Point, Yorkshire, United Kingdom. She was on a voyage from Newcastle upon Tyne, Northumberland, United Kingdom to Vlissingen, Zeeland, Netherlands.
George	United Kingdom	The smack collided with the steamship Phoenix (Denmark) in the River Humber and was abandoneed by all but one of her crew, who were rescued by Phoenix. The remaining crew member ran her ashore and she sank.
Industrie	United Kingdom	The brig capsized and sank in the Clyde at Port Glasgow, Renfrewshire. Her crew were rescued. She was on under tow from Greenock to Glasgow. Industrie was righted on 20 February and found to be severely damaged.
Mystery	Canada	The ship ran aground on The Shingles, off the Isle of Wight, United Kingdom. She was on a voyage from Newcastle upon Tyne, Northumberland, United Kingdom to Figueira da Foz, Portugal.
Rose	United Kingdom	The ship was driven onto the Bowling Rocks, on the coast on Northumberland.
Young Louisa	(United Kingdom of Great Britain and Ireland) Jersey	The ship ran aground on The Shingles. She was refloated the next day.

== 16 February ==
List of shipwrecks: 16 February 1868
Ship	State	Description
Esmeralda	United Kingdom	The ship ran aground off Broughton Island, New South Wales. She was on a voyage from Liverpool, Lancashire to Sydney, New South Wales. She had been refloated by 27 February and taken in to Sydney.
Londonderry	United Kingdom	The brig ran aground on the Maplin Sands, in the North Sea off the coast of Essex. She was refloated the next day.
Marie Elize	United Kingdom	The ship ran aground off Stettin. She was on a voyage from Newcastle upon Tyne, Northumberland to Stettin.
Milo	United Kingdom	The ship ran aground on The Shingles, off the Isle of Wight. She was refloated with assistance from Wanderer (United Kingdom) and taken in to Yarmouth, Isle of Wight.
Patty and Polly	United Kingdom	The ship foundered in the English Channel off Hastings, Sussex. She was on a voyage from London to Plymouth, Devon.
Sandringham	United Kingdom	The ship was wrecked in the Gaspar Strait. She was on a voyage from Manila, Spanish East Indies to Queenstown, County Cork.
Sea Belle	(United Kingdom of Great Britain and Ireland) New Zealand	The 27-ton cutter was wrecked after being stranded on a sandspit at Whangapoua, New Zealand.
Superior	United Kingdom	The barque was run down and sunk off Ramsgate, Kent by the steamship Lena (United Kingdom) with the loss of two of her crew. Superior was on a voyage from Newcastle upon Tyne, Northumberland to Santander, Spain.
Woodlark	(United Kingdom of Great Britain and Ireland) New Zealand	The brig was wrecked while carrying cargo from Sydney to Newcastle.

== 17 February ==
List of shipwrecks: 17 February 1868
Ship	State	Description
Betty	Netherlands	The barque ran aground on the Goodwin Sands, Kent, United Kingdom. She was on a voyage from Newcastle upon Tyne, Northumberland, United Kingdom to Java, Netherlands East Indies. She was refloated and put in to Brouwershaven, Zeeland, Netherlands in a leaky condition.
Eureka	United States	The ship caught fire at Antwerp, Belgium.
Fuschia	United Kingdom	The schooner ran aground on the Maplin Sands, in the North Sea off the coast of Essex.
Scotia	United Kingdom	The schooner struck rocks at Girdle Ness, Aberdeenshire and was holed. She was beached at Aberdeen. She was on a voyage from Newcastle upon Tyne, Northumberland to Aberdeen.
Two unnamed vessels	Flags unknown	The ships were damaged by fire at Antwerp.

== 18 February ==
List of shipwrecks: 18 February 1868
Ship	State	Description
Acadia	United Kingdom	The steamship ran aground in the Clyde. She was refloated and taken in to Glasgow, Renfrewshire.
Anna	United Kingdom	The ship was wrecked at Dénia, Spain.
Anna Catharina	United Kingdom	The ship was wrecked at Dénia.
Batavier	Netherlands	The steamship ran aground at Brielle, South Holland. She was on a voyage from London, United Kingdom to Rotterdam, South Holland. She was refloated the next day.
Cheviot	United Kingdom	The brig was driven ashore at Matanzas, Cuba. She was on a voyage from Matanzas to Portland, Maine, United States.
Cwmsymlog	United Kingdom	The ship departed from Liverpool, Lancashire for Tralee, County Kerry. No further trace, presumed foundered with the loss of all hands.
Killarney	United Kingdom	The steamship ran aground. She was on a voyage from Goole, Yorkshire to Ghent, East Flanders, Belgium. She was refloated and put back to Goole in a leaky condition.

== 19 February ==
List of shipwrecks: 19 February 1868
Ship	State	Description
Alagoas	Imperial Brazilian Navy	Paraguayan War, Battle of Humaitá: The Pará-class monitor was beached in the Paraguay River upstream of Humaitá, Paraguay following damage inflicted in the battle.
Ann	United Kingdom	The smack was driven ashore and wrecked at Porthcawl, Glamorgan with the loss of two of her three crew. The survivor was rescued by the Porthcawl Lifeboat Good Deliverance ( Royal National Lifeboat Institution). Ann was on a voyage from Bristol, Gloucestershire to Swansea, Glamorgan.
Commissioner	United Kingdom	The pilot cutter was run down and sank in the Humber by the steamship Schwalbe (Bremen). Her crew were rescued by Schwalbe.
Buoy	United Kingdom	The ship was driven ashore at Red Wharf Bay, Anglesey.
Catherine	United Kingdom	The schooner was beached at Padstow, Cornwall. She was on a voyage from Liverpool, Lancashire to Plymouth, Devon.
Catherine	United Kingdom	The smack was wrecked on the Dutchman's Bank with the loss of her captain.
Collier	United Kingdom	The ship was driven ashore at Red Wharf Bay. Her crew survived.
Corby Castle	United Kingdom	The ship sank at Amlwch, Anglesey.
Dee	United Kingdom	The ship was driven ashore at Red Wharf Bay.
Devonia	United Kingdom	The schooner was wrecked at Holyhead, Anglesey with the loss of all hands, at least five lives. She was on a voyage from Liverpool to Swansea.
Electric	United Kingdom	The schooner foundered off the Point of Ayr, Cheshire or the Point of Ayre, Isle of Man with the loss of all but two of her crew. She was on a voyage from Runcorn, Cheshire to Campbeltown, Argyllshire.
Elizabeth	United Kingdom	The ship was driven ashore at Red Wharf Bay. Her crew survived.
Endeavour	United Kingdom	The ship was driven ashore at Red Wharf Bay. Her crew survived.
Estella	United Kingdom	The tug collided with the ferry Mayflower (United Kingdom) and sank in the River Mersey. Her crew were rescued by Mayflower.
Fanny Truss	United Kingdom	The ship was driven ashore at Red Wharf Bay. Her crew survived.
Friends	United Kingdom	The ship was driven ashore at Red Wharf Bay. Her crew survived.
Gem	United Kingdom	The ship was driven ashore at Red Wharf Bay.
Gipsey	United Kingdom	The ship was wrecked at St. Ives, Cornwall. Her five crew were rescued by the St. Ives Lifeboat. She was on a voyage from Swansea, Glamorgan to Rouen, Seine-Inférieure, France.
Gloucester Packet	United Kingdom	The smack was abandoned off Fishguard, Pembrokeshire. Both crew were rescued by the Fishguard Lifeboat.
Hannah	United Kingdom	The ship was driven ashore at Red Wharf Bay. Her crew survived.
Jarapa	Netherlands	The barque was driven ashore on Salt Island, Anglesey, United Kingdom. She was on a voyage from San Francisco, California, United States to Liverpool. She was later refloated and towed in to Liverpool by the tugs Reliance and Tiger (both United Kingdom).
Jenny Jones	United Kingdom	The brig was driven ashore and wrecked at Hartland Point, Devon with the loss of all eight crew.
Jeune Joseph	France	The schooner was wrecked on the north Devon coast with the loss of all eight crew.
Johns	United Kingdom	The brigantine ran aground and sank off the Godrevy Lighthouse, Corwnall. She was on a voyage from Saundersfoot, Pembrokeshire to London.
Juno	United Kingdom	The Mersey Flat was driven ashore at Red Wharf Bay. Her crew survived.
Lady Helena	United Kingdom	The ship was driven ashore at Red Wharf Bay.
Lightning	United Kingdom	The smack ran aground at Brixham, Devon. She was refloated and towed in to Brixham in a waterlogged condition.
Lily	United Kingdom	The ship was driven ashore at Red Wharf Bay.
March	United Kingdom	The schooner was driven ashore in Moelfre Bay. Her three crew were rescued by the Moelfre Lifeboat.
Margaret	United Kingdom	The Amlwch-registered ship was driven ashore at Red Wharf Bay.
Margaret	United Kingdom	The Chester-registered ship was driven ashore at Red Wharf Bay. Her crew survived.
Mary and Jane	United Kingdom	The ship was driven ashore at Red Wharf Bay. Her crew survived.
Mary Louisa	United Kingdom	The ship collided with E. H. Taylor (United States) and sank in the English Channel off St. Catherine's Point, Isle of Wight with the loss of all but one of her crew. The survivor was rescued by E. H. Taylor. Mary Louisa was on a voyage from Dieppe, Seine-Inférieure, France to Runcorn.
Mountain Maid	United Kingdom	The ship sank at Amlwch.
Pará	Imperial Brazilian Navy	Paraguayan War, Battle of Humaitá: The Pará-class monitor was beached in the Paraguay River upstream of Humaitá following damage sustained in the battle.
Phantom	United Kingdom	The ship was driven ashore at Brixham.
Princess Amalia	United Kingdom	The smack was wrecked in Lligwy Bay with the loss of both crew.
Prince Waterloo	United Kingdom	The ship was driven ashore at Red Wharf Bay.
Prize	United Kingdom	The ship was driven ashore at Red Wharf Bay.
Quatre Sœurs	France	The schooner was wrecked at Cape Cornwall, United Kingdom with the loss of all hands. She was on a voyage from Saint Petersburg, Russia to Nantes, Loire-Inférieure.
Richard	United Kingdom	The schooner was abandoned in Moelfre Bay. Her three crew were rescued by the Moelfre Lifeboat. She was subsequently taken in to the Menai Strait.
Souvenir	France	The brigantine was wrecked at Hartland Point with the loss of three of her seven crew. Survivors were rescued by rocket apparatus. She was on a voyage from Bilbao, Spain to Newport, Monmouthshire, United Kingdom.
Sparling	United Kingdom	The ship was driven ashore at Red Wharf Bay. Her crew survived.
Stag	United Kingdom	The ship was driven ashore at Red Wharf Bay. Her crew survived.
Success	United Kingdom	The ship was driven ashore at Red Wharf Bay.
Tamandaré	Imperial Brazilian Navy	Paraguayan War, Battle of Humaitá: The ironclad gunboat was beached in the Paraguay River upstream of Humaitá following damage sustained in the battle.
Tan Tivy	United Kingdom	The ship was driven ashore at Red Wharf Bay.
Thames	United Kingdom	The ship sank at Amlwch.
Thomas	United Kingdom	The schooner sank at Amlwch.
Victoria	United Kingdom	The ship sank at Amlwch.
Wepre Lass	United Kingdom	The schooner was driven ashore at Red Wharf Bay. Her crew survived.
Unnamed	United Kingdom	The gig capsized whilst going to the aid of Gipsey (United Kingdom) with the loss of one of her two crew. The survivor was rescued by the St. Ives Lifeboat.
Eleven unnamed vessels	Flags unknown	Seven schooners and four sloops were driven ashore in Moelfre Bay.

== 20 February ==
List of shipwrecks: 20 February 1868
Ship	State	Description
Batavier	United Kingdom	The steamship ran aground at Brielle, South Holland. She was on a voyage from Rotterdam, South Holland to London, United Kingdom.
Ceres	United Kingdom	The ship was driven ashore and wrecked at Youghal, County Cork.
Johan	Norway	The schooner foundered off Læsø, Denmark. She was on a voyage from Newcastle upon Tyne, Northumberland, United Kingdom to Aalborg, Denmark.
North Star	(United Kingdom of Great Britain and Ireland) Isle of Man	The smack was driven ashore and wrecked near Seaton Point, Cumberland. Her three crew were rescued. She was on a voyage from Whitehaven, Cumberland to Peel.
Parary	Portugal	The barque was destroyed by fire at Pernambuco, Brazil.

== 21 February ==
List of shipwrecks: 21 February 1868
Ship	State	Description
Banff	United Kingdom	The schooner was driven ashore at Whitburn, County Durham.
Bellona	United Kingdom	The smack was run ashore at Westport, County Mayo.
HMS Leven	Royal Navy	The Algerine-class gunboat ran aground off "Eunoe Islet", China. Subsequentlyb refloated, repaired and returned to service.
Nithsdale	United Kingdom	The ship was driven ashore and wrecked at Breaksea Point, Glamorgan. Her crew were rescued She was on a voyage from Cork to Newport, Monmouthshire.
Prompt	United Kingdom	The steamship ran aground at Wisbech, Cambridgeshire. She was on a voyage from Rotterdam, South Holland, Netherlands to Wisbech.

== 22 February ==
List of shipwrecks: 22 February 1868
Ship	State	Description
Alacer	United Kingdom	The Thames barge ran aground on the Buxey Sand, in the North Sea off the coast of Essex. Her crew were rescued. Alacer was on a voyage from London to Maldon, Essex. She floated off the next day and taken in to Sheerness, Kent.
Antouin	France	The smack ran aground on the Black Rock Ledge, off the Isle of Wight, United Kingdom of Great Britain and Ireland. She was on a voyage from London, United Kingdom to Brest, Finistère.
Bernard Barton	United Kingdom	The ship ran aground on the West Bank, off the Isle of Wight. She was on a voyage from Antwerp, Belgium to Liverpool, Lancashire. She was refloated.
Chester	United Kingdom	The Mersey Flat was driven ashore at Wylfa, Anglesey. She was on a voyage from Flint to Belfast, County Antrim.
Dart	(United Kingdom of Great Britain and Ireland) Isle of Man	The fishing lugger was abandoned off the Isle of Man. Her crew were rescued by the trawl boat Undine United Kingdom, which towed Dart into Douglas.
John Black	United Kingdom	The ship was driven ashore in the Belfast Lough. She was on a voyage from Dublin to Ardrossan, Ayrshire. She was refloated and taken in to Bangor, County Down for repairs.
Mary Ann	United Kingdom	The ship was driven ashore at Cemaes, Anglesey. She was on a voyage from Runcorn, Cheshire to Wicklow.
Swan	United Kingdom	The schooner collided with Emblem (United Kingdom) and was abandoned in the North Sea off Orfordness, Suffolk. Her crew were rescued by Emblem. Swan was on a voyage from South Shields, County Durham to Margate, Kent.
Tamar	United Kingdom	The brig struck the wreck of Superior United Kingdom and sank in the Gull Stream. Her crew were rescued by the steamship Concordia (United Kingdom). Tamar was on a voyage from South Shields to Plymouth, Devon.
Unicorn	United Kingdom	The schooner was driven ashore in the Larne Lough. She was on a voyage from Magheramorne, County Antrim to Belfast.

== 23 February ==
List of shipwrecks: 23 February 1868
Ship	State	Description
Kitty	United Kingdom	The schooner collided with the barque Frigate Bird (Norway) and sank off the "Cabezos". Her seven crew were rescued by Frigate Bird. Kitty was on a voyage from Cardiff, Glamorgan to Palermo, Sicily, Italy.
Mary Emilie	France	The brig was wrecked on the Holm Sand, in the North Sea off the coast of Suffolk, United Kingdom. Her nine crew were rescued by two brigs, including Fortitude (United Kingdom).
Melbourne	United Kingdom	The ship collided with HMS Viper (Royal Navy) in the River Mersey and was beached at New Ferry, Cheshire. She was on a voyage from Savannah, Georgia, United States to Liverpool, Lancashire.
Olly	United Kingdom	The ship ran aground in the Hooghly River. She was on a voyage from the Clyde to Calcutta, India. She was refloated on 25 February.
Omega	United Kingdom	The ship ran aground on the Cockle Sand, in the North Sea off the coast of Suffolk, collided with the Cockle Lightship ( Trinity House) and was abandoned with the loss of one of her nineteen crew. Survivors were rescued by the Cockle Lightship, the Caister Lifeboat Birmingham No.2 and the Great Yarmouth Lifeboat Mark Lane (both Royal National Lifeboat Institution). Omega was on a voyage from Sunderland, County Durham to Cartagena, Spain. She foundered 14 nautical miles (26 km) off Lowestoft, Suffolk.
William Barker	United Kingdom	The schooner was wrecked at Whitby, Yorkshire. Her crew were rescued by rocket apparatus and breeches buoy.

== 24 February ==
List of shipwrecks: 24 February 1868
Ship	State	Description
Red Gauntlett	United Kingdom	The barque was wrecked on the Dutch coast. All on board were rescued.

== 25 February ==
List of shipwrecks: 25 February 1868
Ship	State	Description
Cornelia	United Kingdom	The ship was driven ashore and wrecked at Hartland Point, Devon. She was on a voyage from London to Swansea, Glamorgan.

== 26 February ==
List of shipwrecks: 26 February 1868
Ship	State	Description
Britannia	United Kingdom	The schooner sank in the North Sea off the Mouse Lightship ( Trinity House). Her crew were rescued.
Zitella	United Kingdom	The ship collided with Esther (United Kingdom) and sank in the North Sea. Her crew were rescued by Esther.

== 27 February ==
List of shipwrecks: 27 February 1868
Ship	State	Description
City of Melbourne	United Kingdom	The ship caught fire and sank at Melbourne, Victoria. She was on a voyage from Liverpool, Lancashire to Melbourne. She was later refloated.
Hero	United Kingdom	The steamship was driven ashore on Süderoog, Prussia.

== 28 February ==
List of shipwrecks: 28 February 1868
Ship	State	Description
Adelgunde	Flag unknown	The barque collided with a Dutch brigantine and sank in the English Channel 20 nautical miles (37 km) south of Start Point, Devon, United Kingdom. Her crew were rescued by the brigantine. She was on a voyage from Newcastle upon Tyne, Northumberland to Lisbon, Portugal.
Belle Francaise	United Kingdom	The ship collided with Ellen (United Kingdom) and sank in the English Channel off Hastings, Sussex. Her crew were rescued by Ellen. Belle Francaise was on a voyage from Newcastle upon Tyne, Northumberland to Dublin.
Hubertus	United Kingdom	The brig was run down and sunk by the steamship Sherburn (United Kingdom). Four of her six crew were reported missing, the rest were rescued by Sherburn.
Sampson	United Kingdom	The schooner collided with the brig Mercury (United Kingdom) and sank in the English Channel 10 nautical miles (19 km) off Start Point. Her crew were rescued by Mercury. Sampson was on a voyage from Cádiz, Spain to Hull, Yorkshire.
Unnamed	United Kingdom	The schooner was wrecked on Rhum, Inner Hebrides with the loss of all four crew.
Unnamed	Flag unknown	The brigantine foundered in the English Channel off Worthing, Sussex with the loss of all hands.

== 29 February ==
List of shipwrecks: 29 February 1868
Ship	State	Description
Devonshire	United Kingdom	The barque was wrecked at Audresselles, Pas-de-Calais with the loss of all sixteen crew. She was on a voyage from Alexandria, Egypt to Grimsby, Lincolnshire.

== Unknown date ==
List of shipwrecks: Unknown date in February 1868
Ship	State	Description
Abgyle	United Kingdom	The schooner was abandoned off Tory Island, County Donegal before 10 February. She was on a voyage from Saint John's, Newfoundland Colony to the Clyde.
Amelia	France	The ship was wrecked at Cape Negro, Nova Scotia, Canada. She was on a voyage from Toulon, Var to Cayenne, French Guiana.
Amethyst	United Kingdom	The brig was wrecked at Cape Negro.
Annie M. Goodwin	United Kingdom	The barque was lost near Buenos Aires, Argentina.
Argyle	United Kingdom	The ship foundered in the Atlantic Ocean. Her crew were rescued. she was on a voyage from Newfoundland to the Clyde.
Ariadne	United Kingdom	The ship was wrecked at Torre del Mar, Spain.
Claverhouse	United Kingdom	The ship was driven ashore in the Euphrates. She was on a voyage from Bushire, Persia to London. She was refloated.
Columbia	Norway	The ship was abandoned in the Indian Ocean. Her crew took to the boats; they were rescued four days later by Alimen (United Kingdom). Columbia was on a voyage from Cardiff, Glamorgan, United Kingdom to Rangoon, Burma.
Delphin	(Russian Empire) Grand Duchy of Finland	The ship was driven ashore near Kertch, Russia.
Eilea	Hamburg	The ship was lost near the mouth of the Rio Grande.
Kornaloff, or Kornlieff	Russia	The steamship foundered in the Mediterranean Sea off the coast of Algeria. She was on a voyage from Odesa to Havre de Grâce, Seine-Inférieure, France.
Light of the Age	United Kingdom	The ship was wrecked at the Port Phillip Heads, Victoria before 24 February. All on board were rescued.
M. T. Trueman	United States	The ship was wrecked at Trepassey, Newfoundland Colony with the loss of all but her captain. She was on a voyage from New York to Saint John's, Newfoundland.
Queen of the Clippers	Canada	The schooner was holed by ice at Winkworth, Nova Scotia before 22 February.
S. Deonista	Greece	The brig was lost at Patras.
Teresa	United Kingdom	The barque foundered in the Indian Ocean (11°30′S 37°00′W). Her crew were rescued by Eddystone (United States).
Tigri	Spain	The ship ran aground at St. Jago de Cuba, Cuba. She was refloated and resumed her voyage.
Unnamed	United States	The ship caught fire 90 nautical miles (170 km) off Cape Sable Island, Nova Scotia on or about 10 February. Laden with petroleum, she was still burning on 12 February when discovered by the steamships Palmyra and William Penn (both United Kingdom).
