= Abbey (given name) =

Abbey is a unisex given name. Notable people with the given name include:

== Women ==
- Abbey Burton (born 1987), British sports shooter
- Abbey Caldwell (born 2001), Australian middle-distance runner
- Abbey Cheek (born 1997), American softball player
- Abbey Perkins Cheney (1851–1970), American musical educator
- Abbey Clancy (born 1986), English lingerie and catwalk model
- Abbey Cooper (born 1992), American middle- and long-distance runner
- Abbey Curran (born 1987), American beauty pageant contestant
- Abbey Dowrick (born 2002), Australian rules footballer
- Abbey Duke, American politician
- Abbey Fleck, American child inventor
- Abbey Freeborn (born 1996), English cricketer
- Abbey Glynn (born 2001), American sprinter and hurdler
- Abbey Green (footballer) (born 1997), Australian footballer
- Abbey Harkin (born 1998), Australian swimmer
- Abbey Hoes (born 1994), Dutch film and television actress
- Abbey Holmes (born 1991), Australian women's footballer for Adelaide Crows
- Abbey Hsu (born 2001), American basketball player
- Abbey Lee Kershaw (born 1987), Australian fashion model
- Abbey Levy (born 2000), American ice hockey goaltender
- Abbey Lincoln (1930–2010), African-American jazz vocalist
- Abbey McCulloch (born 1990), Australian netball player
- Abbey Romeo (born 1998), American reality show cast member
- Abbey Ryan (born 1979), American painter and educator
- Abbey-Leigh Stringer (born 1995), English footballer
- Abbey Weitzeil (born 1996), American swimmer
- Abbey Willcox (born 1996), Australian freestyle skier
- Abbey Wilson (born 2006), Australian snowboarder

== Men ==
- Abbey Altson (1866–1948), British artist
- Abbey Dhaira (1987–2016), Ugandan footballer
- Abbey Konowitch, American music and media executive, producer, and marketing consultant
- Abbey Mzayiya (1985–2013), Notable South African
- Abbey Jack Neidik (born 1947), Canadian film director
- Abbey Nkomo (1940–2021), South African politician and doctor
- Abbey Okulaja (born 1965), Major Soccer referee
- Abbey Rader (1943–2025), American avant-garde jazz drummer
- Abbey Rude (born 1975), American rapper
- Abbey Silverstone, American computer executive
- Abbey Simon (1920–2019), American musician

== Fiction ==
- Abbey Bartlet, a character played by Stockard Channing on the television serial drama, The West Wing
- Abbey Bominable, daughter of the Yeti, from Monster High

== See also ==
- Abbey (surname)
- Abbey (disambiguation)
- Abby
- Abbi (disambiguation)
