= Abbey (surname) =

Abbey is an English surname, denoting someone living near an abbey or having an occupation working in one. Surname variants of Abbey include Abbay (below), Abbe, Abby (not the given name), Abdey and Abdie.

Notable people with the surname include:

- Beatrice Agyeman Abbey, Ghanaian CEO of Media General
- Bert Abbey (1869–1962), American baseball player
- Bruce Abbey (born 1951), Canadian ice hockey player
- Charles Abbey (1913–1982), Australian politician
- Charlie Abbey (1866–1926), American baseball player
- David Abbey (born 1941), English cricketer
- Edward Abbey (1927–1989), American author
- Edwin Austin Abbey (1852–1911), American artist and illustrator
- George Abbey (NASA) (1932–2024), American National Aeronautics and Space Administration (NASA) official
- George Abbey (footballer) (born 1978), Nigerian footballer
- Grace Abbey (born 1999), English footballer
- Graham Abbey (born 1971), Canadian actor
- Helen Abbey (1915–2001), American statistician
- Henry Abbey (1842–1911), American poet
- Henry Eugene Abbey (1846–1896), theatre manager and producer
- Jeffrey Abbey (born 1998), American racing driver
- Jerome Abbey (born 2009), English footballer
- Joe Abbey (1925–2014), American football player
- John Abbey (organ builder) (1785–1859), English organ builder
- John Roland Abbey (1894–1969), English book collector
- Leon Abbey (1900–1975), American jazz violinist and bandleader
- Lynn Abbey (born 1948), American author
- Nathan Abbey (born 1978), English footballer
- Nelson Abbey (born 2003), English footballer
- Richard Abbey (1805–1891), American Methodist minister
- Rita Deanin Abbey (1930–2021), American artist
- Robert Mensah Abbey, Ghanaian politician
- Ross Abbey (born 1953), Australian rules football player
- Zema Abbey (born 1977), English footballer

== Variants ==
=== Abbay ===
- Richard Abbay (1838–1919), American politician
