= Abey (name) =

Abey is both a given name and a surname. Notable people with the name include:

- Abey Belasco (1797–1830), English boxer
- Abey Kuruvilla (born 1968), Indian cricketer
- Priscilla Abey (born 1999), Ugandan basketball player
- Zach Abey, American football player

== See also ==
- Abbey (disambiguation)
