= Great storm of 1868 =

Storm in New Zealand

The great storm of 1868 was a violent storm that swept across much of New Zealand between 1–6 February 1868, wrecking 12 ships – including the Star of Tasmania and Water Nymph at Oamaru – and causing extensive flooding. About 40 people are known to have died and at the time an estimated £500,000 to £1 million worth of damage was caused. The storm is currently thought to have been an extratropical cyclone, which peaked in New Zealand over the period between the 3rd and 4th. In total 2,585 tons of shipping was lost, which was nearly half the tonnage lost during the full year. The flooding in the south of the South Island was the worst until 1945. The loss of life among the Māori population, if any, was not known.

== Origin ==
Between November and April, New Zealand can occasionally be exposed to tropical cyclones or their remnants. These typically originate in the vicinity of Vanuatu and Fiji. In the case of this storm, there was a cyclone reported in the New Hebrides (now Vanuatu) on 30 January 1868 which could have been its origin.

== Meteorological readings ==
At the time the great storm struck there were a small number of meteorological observation stations around New Zealand under Dr. James Hector's Geological Survey of New Zealand. There was no ability for them, at that time, to know of the storms origin, approach, or intensity.

=== Barometric pressure ===
Barometric pressure recorded at Auckland on the 3 February was 955hPA. Blenheim and New Plymouth recorded a minimum of about 968hPA during this event. At Nelson the barometer fell from 30.10 deg to 20.60 deg in 24 hours. Barometric pressure on the West Coast fell to 980hPA.

=== Rainfall ===
Napier reported heavy rain commencing on the 2nd, but reducing to showers on the 3rd. Nelson recorded 12.91 inches of rain over the period 3–5 February, with 7.03 inches falling on the 5th. Bealey 3.07 inches in 24 hours and Christchurch 1.5 inches in the same period. Mount Peel homestead recorded 8.08 inches of rain over a 24-hour period. Dunedin had the heaviest rainfall it had known between the 4th and 5th.

=== Wind ===
Northland and the West Coast reported high winds and seas. On 1 February Auckland reported a cyclone of shore and winds at their highest since the settlement began in the 1840s. The wind was from an easterly quarter, changing to the north-west on the 5th. At Nelson gales demolished some buildings and uprooted numerous trees. Christchurch had a violent north-easterly gale with heavy rain on the 2nd. Lyttelton reported heavy gales on the 3rd.

=== Hail and tornadoes ===
Hail 1.5 inch in diameter was reported at Nelson and a waterspout was seen. Lightning was also reported at Nelson. There was a severe electrical storm at Dunedin on the 6th. On the 4th Invercargill was struck by a violent hail storm.

== The ship Maori ==
The Maori a 703-ton sailing ship under Captain D T Roberts encountered the storm on the 31 January to the north of New Zealand in the vicinity of the Three Kings Islands, while sailing to Auckland from London. The day had begun with a reasonably calm sea, but the barometer had been falling from 30.30 the previous evening to 30.07 in at noon. The wind from the east was strengthening and sea became rougher. At 6pm the barometer had fallen to 30.00 and the sea was heavy with a strengthening gale. The gale continued to strengthen through the evening and by midnight the barometer had dropped to 29.96 with violent squalls and rain. Through the next day the wind turned towards the south and increased in intensity. By midnight the barometer had dropped to 29.30. At 4am on the 2 February the barometer dropped to 28.93, but the wind died away with the ship having reached the centre of the cyclone. The barometer fell to its lowest point 28.82 at 2pm, with the wind beginning to return to cyclonic strength. Through the remainder of the day the wind gradually changed to a westerly direction. Through the night the wind began to drop in intensity and by the 3rd the weather had improved significantly.

== Damage ==
Location	Ships wrecked	Deaths	Comment
Arrow Bluff			Road between Arrow Bluff and the lakes cut off by a large slip
Ashley		3	Three children drowned.
Blenheim			Wairau Plain and Blenheim township flooded, some bridges and roads washed away. Many livestock drowned.
Canterbury			Worst flooding ever recorded with all rivers at high levels. Over 3,000 sheep drowned. Christchurch and surrounding towns isolated from one another. Severe damage to roads and bridges throughout the area. Kaiapoi totally flooded.
Christchurch			On the 4th the Avon River overtopped its banks with flood waters reaching around the base of the Godley statue in Cathedral Square. The river was 10 feet above its normal level. The Waimakariri River overflowed flooding Fendalton and the surrounding countryside.
Dunedin			Extensive flooding, Mill Dam broke, Rattray and Macclaggan Streets flooded twice, on the 3rd and 5th. Part of the Dunedin Botanic Gardens was eroded by the Leith.
Great Barrier Island			Mine Bay copper mine machinery washed away.
Haumuri Bluff	Schooner Sea Bird		Schooner Sea Bird driven ashore on the 3rd and wrecked. Crew survived.
Hokianga	The brig Fortune	7	The Fortune was stranded and wrecked 10 miles south of Hokianga. Only one of her 8 seamen survived.
Hokitika		2	A couple were killed by a falling tree.
Kaikōura			Houses and land washed out to sea
Le Bons Bay	Schooner Breeze Cutter Challenge	1	Schooner Breeze driven ashore on 3 February and wrecked. All the crew were rescued by the bay's residents. The next day the cutter Challenge was wrecked and ships mate drowned while trying to row for shore.
Levels plains		6	At least 6 people drowned when their houses were washed away by floodwaters.
Lyttelton	Schooners Iona and Three Sisters		Two ships were wrecked. They were the schooners Iona and Three Sisters.
Napier	Echunga		Echunga driven ashore on 3 February and wrecked. No loss of life.
Nelson		1	Extensive damage from flooding and wind. One elderly man died but the cause was not stated. The flooding was the worst the residents had experienced. Numerous fruit trees were damaged.
Oamaru	Star of Tasmania, Water Nymph, and schooner Otago	4 or 5	Star of Tasmania and Water Nymph driven ashore and wrecked. Two children and two or three crew of the Star of Tasmania were drowned. The jetty and most surf boats destroyed. The schooner Otago was also driven ashore, but the crew escaped unharmed.
Outram			Township destroyed by flooding with the Taieri River being 22 feet above its normal level.
Rangiora		2	2 children were drowned by floodwaters.
Taieri Plain			1,000 sheep lost and the Taieri plains described as looking like a sea.
Thames	Yacht Glitter		The yacht was driven onto rocks and sank, and the Thames River flooded.
Timaru	Steamer William Misken	1	The steamer William Misken driven ashore and wrecked. One of her crew was drowned.
Tokomairiro		1	1 person drowned while trying to cross the Tokomairiro River.
Totara Station		9	9 people reported drowned when the Waiareka Stream washed away the two houses they were living in.
West Coast			High winds reported.
West Taieri		2	2 people drowned by floodwaters

== Aftermath ==
The Canterbury Provincial government introduced legislation, Canterbury Rivers Act, in 1868 to allow the construction of protective works to address the flooding caused during this event by the Waimakariri River overtopping its banks and causing the nearby Avon River to flood.

== In the arts ==
Bearing the same name, The Great Storm of 1868, was a 2008 play by New Zealand playwright and author Michelanne Forster based around the event.

== See also ==
- List of shipwrecks in 1868
