= Jack Randall (boxer) =

English boxer (1794–1828)

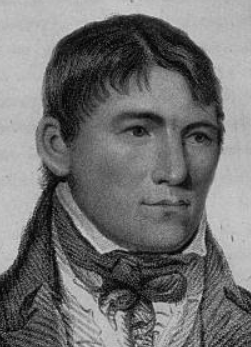
- Randall at 23 from Boxiana, pub. 1818

Personal information
- Nicknames: The Nonpareil (Unequalled); The Prime Irish Lad
- Nationality: British (United Kingdom)
- Born: Jack Randall; 25 November 1794 St. Giles, City of London, England
- Died: 12 March 1828 (aged 33) Chancery Lane, West London
- Height: 5 ft 6 in (1.68 m)
- Weight: lightweight 136–146 lb (62–66 kg).

Boxing career
- Stance: Orthodox, right-handed

Boxing record
- Wins: 16
- Losses: 0
- Draws: 0

Jack Randall (25 November 1794 – 12 March 1828), nicknamed "The Nonpareil", was an exceptional English bare-knuckle boxer, dominant at his weight class, who fought from 1815 to 1822, and retired undefeated. Colonel Barton was his most frequent patron.

Born in London in St. Giles, of Irish ancestry and standing only 5'6" tall, the compact and sturdy Randall was one of the dominant pugilists of his era, winning all of his 16 fights. Those who observed him in the ring described him as a deft pugilist able to adapt to any style, a great offensive and defensive combatant and an effective finisher. Credited as the inventor of the one-two punch, a left jab followed by a rapid right cross, Randall conquered Ned Turner, twice defeated Jack Martin, and starred in a stage version of his ring exploits at London's Regency Theatre.

== Early career ==
Randall's first significant prizefight was with Jack the Butcher at Regent's Park in London's Marylebone. It was fought to resolve a dispute over improper conduct in a fight in which both parties had acted as seconds. The contest was quickly declared in Randall's favour in only twenty minutes. On 26 August 1815, he defeated Walton, the "Twickenham Youth" for five guineas at Coombe Wood (a popular prizefighting location, northeast of Kingston Upon Thames, south of Richmond Park). Randall's opponent took only ten minutes to leave the ring from an onslaught of blows. Randall 'astonished the [spectators] with the gaiety of his style'.

Around 24 April 1816, Randall defeated George Dodd at the popular prizefighting location Moulsey Hurst (in what is now West Molesey, Surrey, on the fringes of Greater London). Twenty-five minutes elapsed before victory was declared for Randall, and he collected five guineas, in a 'well-contested battle'.

Randall next fought the Jewish boxer Ikey Borrock at Coombe Wood on 28 May 1816, winning a purse of six guineas in six rounds. Having already established his reputation, he led in the early betting 6–4. Though appearing more slender than his rival, Randall continuously delivered his signature one-two punch and floored Borrock in nearly every round. Randall used exceptional science, and landed repeated blows to the face of his opponent.Jackson's Oxford Journal estimated the fight time as twelve minutes for the match, and noted that six matches took place that day, with Randall's match coming second.

Randall's next fight was against West-Country Dick, the encounter being held at Moulsey in Surrey on 3 April 1817 for 25 guineas a side. Randall dominated throughout and in the 29th round, dealt a powerful blow to the mid-section of Dick that caused him to roll into a ball. Dick was able to get up but conceded the match after thirty three and a half minutes. Randall demonstrated a great ability with either hand, but had particular success with his left in this contest. After the fight he was described as leaving the ring 'without a scratch upon his face'.

Randall defeated Harry Holt for 25 guineas at Coombe Warren on 20 May 1817 in a match lasting 25 minutes and eight rounds, ending the contest with a tremendous right to the head. Boxiana records that 'In the above contest, Randall firmly established his character as a first rate scientific pugilist. He possesses the mastery of the art in an eminent degree [...] and promptly changes his mode of fighting as the necessity of the attack requires'.

== Match with "Abey" Belasco ==
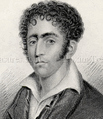
"Abey" Belasco, circa 1818

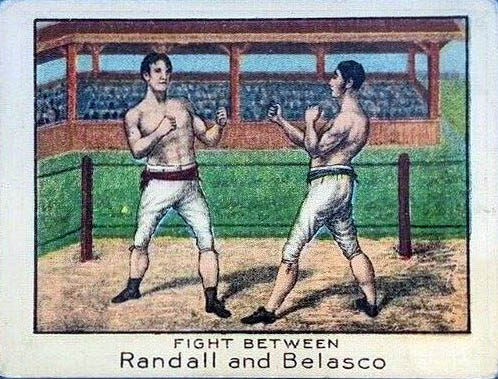
Randall (left) and Belasco

On 30 September 1817, at Shepperton Range, Surrey, Randall defeated the Jewish boxer Abraham "Abey" Belasco, an associate of the great English champion Daniel Mendoza. The stakes for this fight were 50 guineas, the highest so far in Randall's career. Randall entered the ring at around 148 pounds (67 kg), while Belasco weighed roughly eight pounds more. Belasco was known for his desperate and effective infighting, and was considered a skilled, scientific boxer.

Belasco from Famous Fights

The first three rounds of this fight were fought with great caution and few blows were exchanged. Each ended with Belasco on the floor, but he drew first blood in the second round by 'put[ting] in a sharp hit on Randall's mouth, which brought forth the claret in a twinkling'. In the fourth round Belasco was again floored by a 'desperate left handed hit' from Randall. Belasco then tended to his eye as though it was giving him some difficulty. Randall dominated the next few rounds and brought matters to an end in the seventh: 'After some scientific movements, Randall put in so tremendous a hit on Belasco's eye, that the latter instantly put up his hand to feel if it was out of the socket - the pain appeared so excruciating that he staggered fell and fainted. [...] The fight thus terminated in 54 1/2 minutes'.

Pierce Egan wrote of the match that "The most experienced judges of boxing agree that throughout the annals of pugilism, such a finished display of scientific excellence as the above battle is not to be paralleled. It was a perfect picture of the art, and Randall justly acquired the appellation of THE NON-PAREIL'[i.e unequalled or unrivalled]. Egan also noted in Bells Life in London that Randall's 'hitting and getting away, his style of stopping and returning, with the excellent judgment he manifested, added to his activity and quickness on his legs, all tended to stamp him as one of the most finished boxers of his weight.' The following month, on 21 October 1817, Randall fought a sparring contest against the boxer Jack Scroggins for the benefit of Belasco, whose eye he had injured in their match the prior month.

== Matches with Parish and Burke ==
Randall fought Joe Parish "The Waterman" on 27 November 1817 at Hayes Common at Kent (now in the London borough of Bromley). The stakes were the significant sum of 100 guineas a side. Parish was a ferryman who rowed people across the Thames. Randall again dominated throughout, winning in 11 rounds, 53 minutes. For most of the fight he had problems with his left hand, which was cut badly (and a finger broken) in the 3rd round. Despite this, it was noted of Parish that at no point did he have any 'opportunity of turning the battle in his favour', such was Randall's advantage in skill and execution.

Randall next met Burke of Woolwich, for stakes of one hundred guineas a side. The fight took place on 16 June 1818 at Wimbledon Common and Randall extended his 100% career record by winning in twenty-three rounds, taking forty-five minutes. Burke was four inches taller than Randall, at 5 feet 10 inches (1.78 meters) but at the end of the fight Randall 'as usual, retired from the ring with scarcely a scratch about his face'.

== Match with Ned Turner ==
Ned Turner, circa 1818

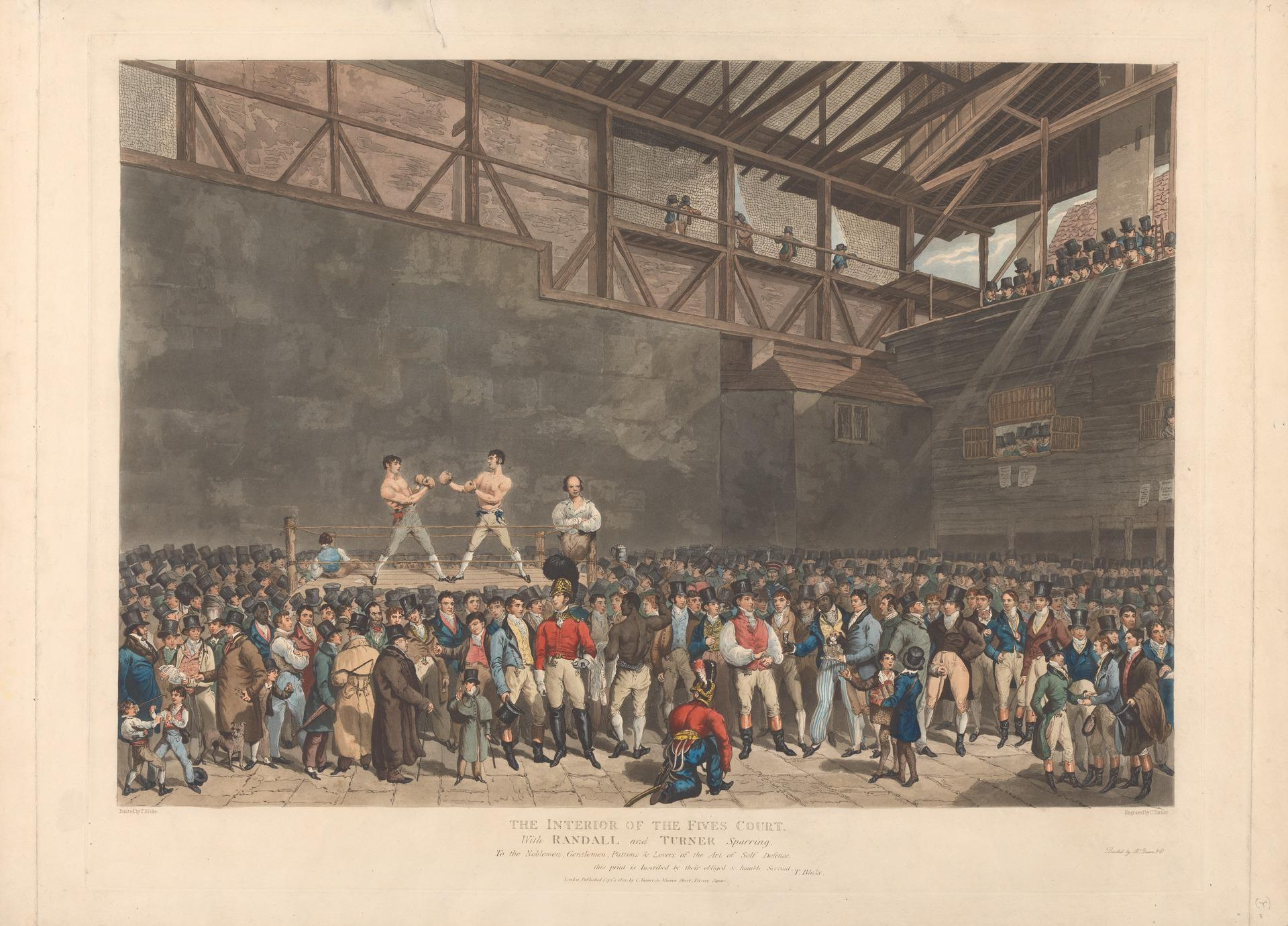
The Interior of the Fives Court, St Martin's Lane, with Randall, and Turner sparring

At this point in Randall's career he 'had disposed of all his opponents with so much ease and certainty, that the sporting world appeared extremely anxious that [Ned] Turner should enter the lists with him; an opinion being entertained that the latter was the only boxer of the light weights that would have any chance of defeating Randall. Turner was a Welshman, unbeaten in his seven previous fights, who had impressed in his recent victories. Betting in the run-up to the fight indicated that it was expected to be a closely fought battle.

The bout was held at Crawley Downs, Sussex, on 5 December 1818. It started cagily, with both boxers wary of each other's ability. The anticipated close match-up came to pass and it was noted after three rounds that Randall 'had never anything like such a customer [as Turner] to deal with before'. Turner fought well, took a lot of punishment, and had the better of Randall in several rounds, including one (the 17th) when he threw him out of the ring. Randall's superiority was clear, however, and he eventually emerged victorious after a hard-fought epic contest of 2 hours and 19 minutes, lasting, in all, 34 rounds. Randall's first act, upon being declared the victor 'was to push the crowd away from him, and to clasp the hand of his brave fallen foe with much zeal and friendship [...]. The [spectators] applauded both of them, and pronounced them the two best bits of stuff, of their weight, in this country '.

London's Morning Post noted that both men showed great control and science in their boxing, and feints and parries abounded, but Turner suffered far more, and most significantly lacked the hitting power of Randall. London's Observer noted that Randall was far more effective in the execution of his science, and though Turner showed nerve and unquestionable courage, the science of his art was not quite the equal of Randall's. Randall's hits were "terribly conclusive", while Turner "seemed unable to strike a severe blow".

== Matches with Jack Martin ==
In his next fight, on 4 May 1819, he faced the well-known boxer Jack Martin, a baker by trade. The location was Crawley Down, Sussex, about 28 miles south of London, and an impressive crowd of 25,000 gathered for the occasion. Puglistica approximated that Martin, weighed as much as a stone more than Randall, slightly over 168 pounds (76 kg) to Martin's 150 (68 kg). Martin's greater reach proved a significant obstacle for Randall. To counter this Randall went inside to Martin's ribs and stomach to force him to drop his guard, quickly allowing him to reach Martin's head. Randall proved the winner in 49 minutes 10 seconds, in a match lasting 19 rounds. He won the victory with comparative ease, and except for a slight mark on his left eye and a scratch on his ear, he had no signs of having been in a boxing match.

After this victory, Randall used his prize winnings to open his own public house, 'The Hole in the Wall' on Chancery-Lane, where he would work and reside the rest of his life. His saloon's opening date was 17 August 1819, according to Bell's London Life. At around this time, Randall issued a challenge to any fighter of under 11 stone to fight him for stakes of 500 guineas a side (an almost unprecedented sum in the history of bare-knuckle boxing). With no challengers emerging Randall effectively retired from the ring to concentrate on running his pub. It would be another two years before he would fight again.

After his defeat to Jack Randall in 1819, Jack Martin went on a streak of six consecutive victories - against Josh Hudson, Cabbage, Phil Sampson, Gypsy Cooper, David Hudson and, finally, against Ned Turner, the only fighter ever to have given Randall any kind of difficulty. At this point Randall declared that he would reduce his required stakes from 500 guineas a side to £300 a side if Martin would agree to fight him. Martin's backers were not immediately keen to take up this challenge, but were heartened by Randall's lack of recent fight experience and the alleged state of his health following two years as a publican (Randall was known to have developed a liking for gin).

The rematch took place on 16 September 1821 at Crawley Down. The bout was hotly anticipated and again attracted a large crowd (estimated to have been in the region of 25,000, according to the Exeter Evening Post). The outcome of the fight was, however, quickly decided, with Randall winning in just one round, lasting under eight minutes.

The bout started with much cagey manoeuvring, feinting and out-fighting before Randall was able to get hold of Martin and apply the tactic known as 'fibbing' (i.e. holding the opponent in a headlock and beating him about the head with the free hand). According to a contemporary account: '[Randall] now put forth such a "bit of good truth" as positively to terrify the spectators with the terrible execution he was capable of administering. He fibbed Martin with the left hand in the most rapid manner, and then changed him on his arm like a baby and repeated four or five blows on his face and neck, operating so decisively on the jugular vein that the eyes of Martin turned up, and he foamed at the mouth. A few drops of claret [i.e. blood] followed, which appeared to have been drawn from his ear, and Randall did not leave him till he was within four inches of the ground. Martin was now so stupid [i.e. stupified] that the back part of his head fell against the stake'. This ended the fight and Randall was declared the victor.

Puglistica recorded that 'the excellence of Randall was so great that no one could have complained to go fifty miles at any time to witness such a display of the art'. Martin, meanwhile, was felt to have had none the worst of it during the protracted out-fighting 'but when the Nonpareil got in [...] he held Martin as tight in his grip as if he had been screwed in a vice'.

Martin attributed his loss to an accident and tried to secure a rematch. Randall, however, said that before the fight he had declared that, regardless of the result, it would be his last fight, and that he had now retired from the ring. Steps were later made to arrange a third Randall-Martin fight in March 1822, but the arrangements ended in dispute. Whether further attempts were made is unclear, with the main sources (Boxiana and Pugilistica), failing to agree on events.

== Stage performer and boxing exhibitor ==
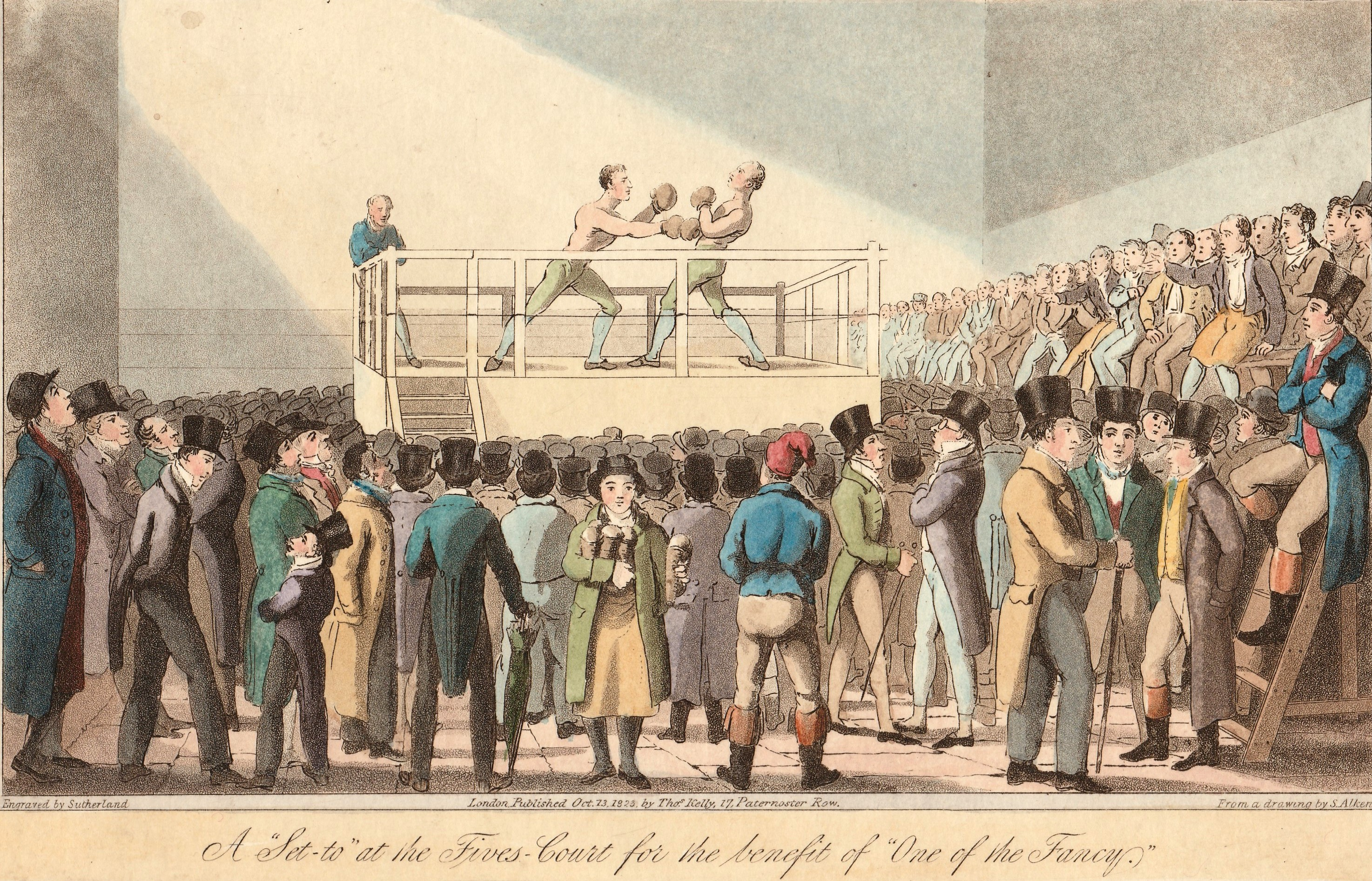
Boxing benefit at the Fives-Court

Randall had become so popular by 1819 that the manager of London's Regency Theatre gave him a salary to exhibit his boxing skills in exhibitions and to perform shadowboxing for audiences. In the early 1820s he appeared as weekly entertainment at the theatre. He did not box professionally during this time, but occasionally donned his gloves and exhibited at benefits at London's Fives-Court on St. Martin's Street, Leicester-field. Admission was charged and as many as 1000 could attend an exhibition, often to raise funds for a retiring boxer. In 1823 he attended benefits for Dick Curtis and Tom Spring, and though he discussed terms of another return to boxing against Gypsy Cooper, nothing came of it.

In one of his last public appearances, he attended a memorial for his boxing rival and friend Ned Turner on 18 April 1826, and addressed the audience. He attended Turner's funeral five days later at Aldgate Churchyard with some of the most exceptional boxers of the era including Tom Owen, Harry Holt, and the boxing reporter who helped immortalize Randall, Pierce Egan.

== Death at 33 ==
Randall struggled with alcoholism, particularly late in life. Pugilistica described the effects of "blue ruin" or cheap gin on his constitution as early as 1819–20, and noted that he was a "persistent drinker of ardent spirits". On 12 March 1828, he succumbed to an illness of around ten weeks, and died at his home, the public house Hole-in-the-Wall on West London's Chancery Lane at the early age of 33, leaving a widow and two children. Pugilistica noted that "Jack never possessed the moral courage to say No to a drop with every customer who proposed to wet an eye". His causes of death included "gout, complicated with a disorganization of the liver and a fatty degeneration of the heart".

He was buried on 19 March 1828 near his birthplace at St Giles in the Fields Churchyard, 60 St. Giles High Street, Holborn, in the London Borough of Camden.

== Honors ==
Randall was admired by the foremost prizefighting reporter of the period, Pierce Egan, who, as a fellow Irishman, also delighted in Randall's Irish parentage:

'JACK RANDALL, DENOMINATED (THE Prime Irish Lad, otherwise the NONPAREIL.)
The Prize-Ring (1818) does not boast of a more accomplished boxer than RANDALL; nor of any pugilist, who, in so short a period, has made greater progress towards arriving at the top of the tree than he has done'. (Boxiana, vol. II, 1818).

He was elected to the International Boxing Hall of Fame in 2005, as a member of the "Pioneers" category, and the bare-knuckle Boxing Hall of Fame in 2011.

== Career record ==
Result	Opponent	Date	Location	Result/Duration	Notes
Win	Jack "The Butcher" Payne	1815	Marylbone Lane, London	20 min	First known match
Win	Walton of Twickenham	26 August 1815	Coombe Wood, Upper Shirley; London	10 minutes	For Five guineas
Win	George Dodd	24 April 1816	Moulsey Hurst	25 minutes	
Win	Ikey "Ugly" Borrock	28 May 1816	Coombe Wood, Eng.	6 rounds, 12 mins	Used one-two punch
Win	West-Country Dick	28 April 1817	Moulsey, Surrey, Eng.	29 rounds, 33.5 mins	Used left hand, 25 guineas
Win	Harry Holt	20 May 1817	Coombe Warren, Eng.	8 rounds, 25 mins	
Win	Abey Belasco	30 Sep 1817	Sheperton Range, England	7 rounds	For 50 guineas
Win	Joe "The Waterman" Parish	27 Nov 1817	Hayes Common, Kent, Eng.	11 rounds	
Win	Woolwich Burke	16 June 1818	Wimbledon Common	23 rounds, 45 mins	For 100 guineas
Win	Ned Turner	5 Dec 1818	Crawley Downs, Eng.	34 rounds, 2 hrs, 19.5 mins	Turner lacked a hard punch
Win	Jack Martin	4 May 1819	Crawley Downs	19 rounds, 49 mins	25,000 fans
Win	Jack Martin	16 Sep 1821	Crawley Downs	1 round	20,000 fans, 300 guinea purse

== External Sources ==
- Randall's career record, as shown in the 1841 source, Fistiana, or the Oracle of the Ring
- Chapter on Randall in Pierce Egan's Boxiana, Sketches of Modern Pugilism, volume 2, 1829
- Chapter on Randall in Henry Downes Miles' Pugilistica, the History of British Boxing volume 1, 1906
- Entry for 'Fibbing' in Pierce Egan's revised 1823 edition of Grose's Dictionary of the Vulgar Tongue, detailing Randall's status as the acknowledged master of the art
