= Beatrice Agyemang =

Ghanaian CEO

- Born: Beatrice Agyeman Abbey
- Occupation: CEO/ General Manager
- Years active: 2000-present

Beatrice Agyeman Abbey is a Ghanaian Chief Executive Officer and General manager of Media General, a large Ghanaian media organization that owns and operates TV3, Onua FM, 3FM, Connect FM, Akoma FM, and MG Digital, among others. In 2021, she was awarded as the Outstanding Broadcast Media CEO of the Year in the Ghana Entrepreneur and Corporate Executive Awards.

== Education ==
She obtained both her bachelor's degree and master's degree from GIMPA.

== Career ==
Beatrice started her career in 2000 as a reporter, then a Broadcast Journalist and News Anchor. In 2017, she became the General Manager for the Media General. She was the Head of the Media General Digital for over a year and General Manager of Media General Radio for sometime. She has interviewed notable persons such as John Agyekum Kufuor, John Mahama, and Ellen Johnson Sirleaf. She has worked with major news houses such as BBC, Sky TV, Citizen TV, CNN, VOA, and Kiss TV in Kenya.

Beatrice Agyemang was recognized on Avance Media's 2023 list of the 100 Most Influential African Women for leading one of Ghana's foremost media organizations. She is an alumna of the Ghana Institute of Management and Public Administration (GIMPA).

== Awards ==
- In September 2020, she was awarded for Excellence in Media at the Ghana Women of the Year. It was organized by Glitz Africa.
- In May 2021, she was awarded as the Outstanding Broadcast Media CEO of the Year in the Ghana Entrepreneur and Corporate Executive Awards. It was organized by the Entrepreneurs Foundation of Ghana (EFG).
