= Abey Belasco =

Bare-knuckle boxer (1797–1830)

Abey or Aby Belasco
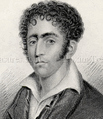

Personal information
- Nicknames: Aby, sometimes Abey
- Nationality: English, of Spanish heritage
- Born: Abraham Belasco; Aby Belasco in Puglistica; 9 April 1797 or 1798 Aldgate, London, England
- Died: 13 May 1859 (aged 63) London, England
- Height: 5 ft 6.5 in (1.69 m)
- Weight: lightweight - welterweight Averaged 147 lb, 66.6 kg

Boxing career
- Stance: Bare-knuckle boxing Fists raised, one foot leading

Abraham Belasco, usually Aby or Abey, (1797 – 1830) was an English bare-knuckle boxer who fought between 1817 and 1824, and was considered one of the top rated Jewish boxers of the post-Mendoza era, along with Isaac Bitton, Young Dutch Sam and Barney Aaron. In his prime in 1817–18, Belasco may have been considered among the five highest rated London area boxers in any weight class.

== Early life and career ==
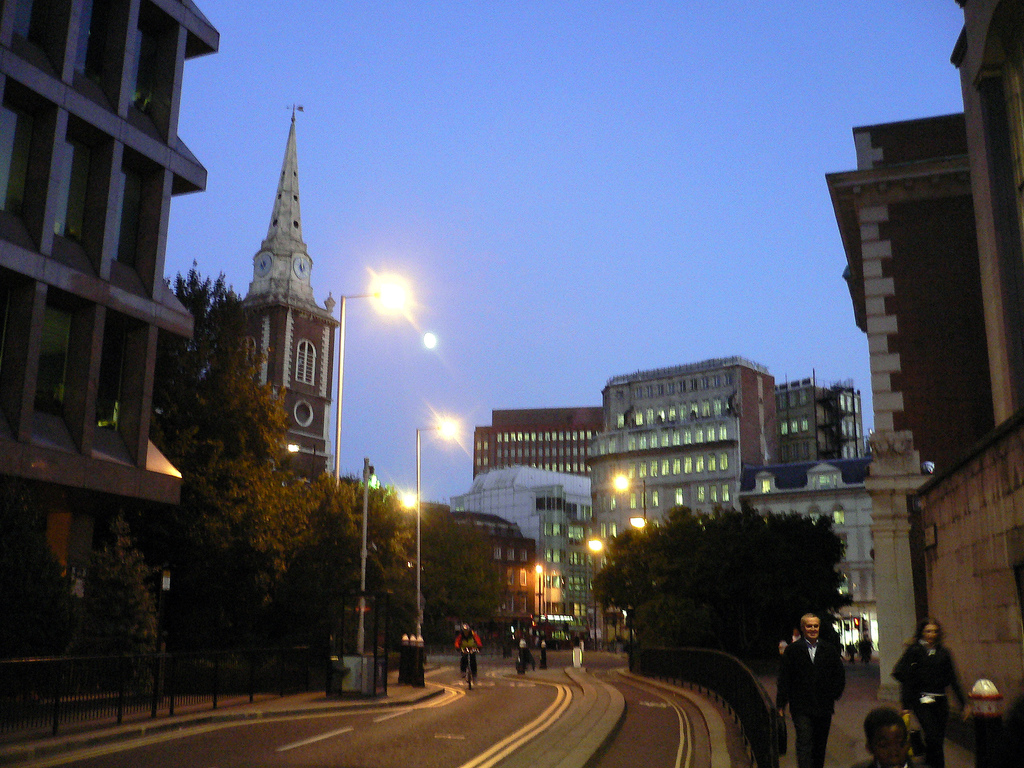
Modern day St. Botolph Church, (left) Aldgate, near Belasco's birthplace

Belasco was born to a large Jewish family in Aldgate, Middlesex County, in London, England, and according to several accounts near St. Botolph's Church parish, now known as St. Botolph's Without Aldgate, on 9 April 1797 or possibly 1798, the son of Joseph and Sarah Nunes Martines Belasco. Belasco had two brothers, Samuel and Israel or Izzy who also pursued boxing as a profession, but with less success, and may have had two additional brothers who tried boxing.

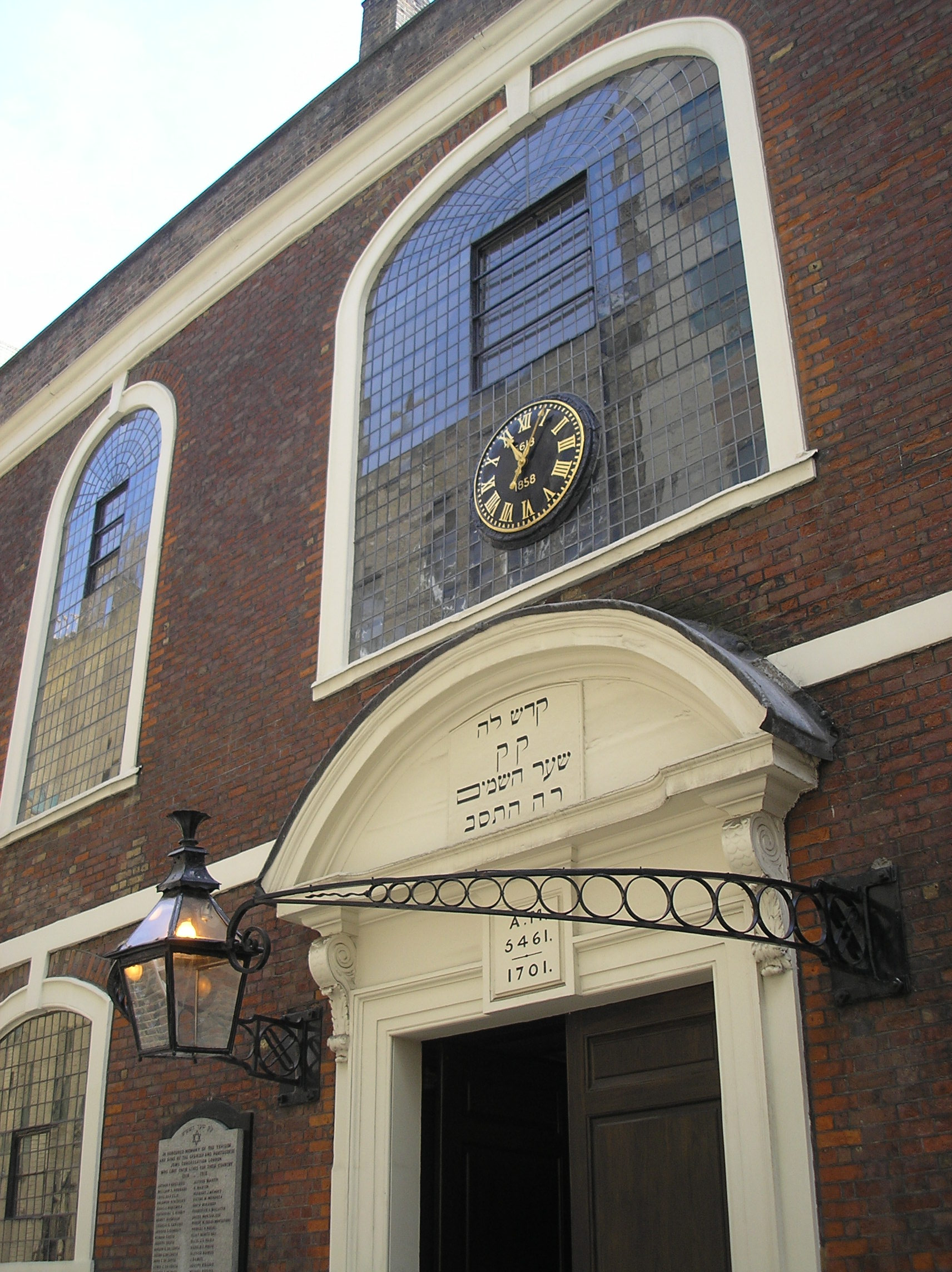
Bevis Marks Synagogue

Contemporary genealogies indicate Belasco was likely of seventeenth century Spanish heritage on both sides, making him of Sephardic Jewish origins. At the time, Aldgate, his birthplace, was an old Jewish section of London, and housed the Bevis Marks Synagogue, the oldest Synagogue in the United Kingdom, built in 1791. For Sephardic Jews like Belasco, the Synagogue was a religious centre of the Anglo-Jewish world, and served as a clearing-house for congregational and societal Jewish problems which at some point may have included Jewish participation in the English Parliament, and the ability of unpropertied Jews in London to obtain voting rights which they lacked during Belasco's boxing career. The father of British Prime Minister Benjamin Disraeli and the boxer Daniel Mendoza, Belasco's mentor, attended the Synagogue in the 1800s.

Pierce Egan in Boxiana, describing Belasco's pluck, determination, and ability to get close to and adapt to another boxer's style, wrote that he was "a most mischievous boxer, he set-to with all the varieties of a harlequin. An awkward man to get at and a truly desperate in-fighter, he was one that would not be denied, and would rally with his opponent to the end of the chapter". Belasco used these traits to gain notice in the ring, but may have also hoped to use his tenacity to gain respect and attention to the unpropertied Jewish underclass in London who accounted for many of his followers.

== Student of Daniel Mendoza ==
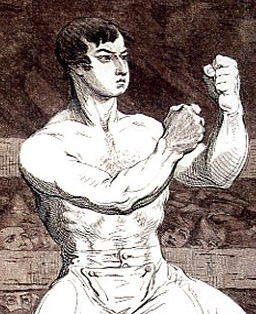
Mendoza in boxing pose, left leading

The better known bare knuckle Jewish boxer Daniel Mendoza, the sixteenth boxing champion of England, and an architect of modern scientific boxing, was a friend, mentor, and business associate. Belasco used Mendoza's new scientific style of "boxing", which included careful parrying of opponent's blows with a fist or arm, a technique borrowed from the sport of fencing. Like most successful boxers of his era, he adopted the stance recommended by Mendoza's Art of Boxing, a slight slouch with fists raised to allow both a quick jab with one arm and a ready block of oncoming punches with the other. Belasco, though he was thirty years younger, engaged Mendoza in a sparring partnership in an exhibition in 1818, one of which took place the first week of December in Lincoln, Lincolnshire, in the East Midlands, around 150 miles North of London. Henry D. Miles, the author of Puglistica, the definitive record of the London Prize ring, wrote that Belasco was "a boxer of superior talent, a master of the science, not wanting for game, not deficient in strength, of an athletic make, a penetrating eye, and in the ring full of life and activity".

Belasco's earliest known match was with a man known as Cribb's Coal-heaver, as he was patronized by Tom Crib, a champion of England. Belasco fought well, forcing his opponent to leave the ring in thirty minutes. As a result, he came to the attention of a number of amateur boxing enthusiasts, and began to enjoy a large Jewish following.

His first match of note was with the better known English boxer Josh Hudson near the barge house at Woolrich, and Belasco, according to Puglistica, the leading boxing journal of the era, won the contest after one hour and thirty minutes.

In a far more publicized battle, with a better known adversary, he defeated Jack "The Butcher" Payne in sixteen rounds on 3 April 1817 at Moulsey Heath, Surrey. In the fourth round, Belasco had already taken the lead against Payne, and "punished him in all directions". In the eleventh, the Butcher could not keep his head out of chancery, or being held and struck by Belasco. In the final round, Payne ran at Belasco furiously and was floored for the last time by a solid punch, ending the match after seventeen minutes when the Butcher could not resume the battle. Belasco was said to have retired from the match without a scratch.

=== Lengthy match with Tom Reynolds ===
Reynolds caught Belasco full in the eye an hour and fifteen minutes into the match, from Famous Fights

On 23 July 1817, at Moulsey Heath, Pierce Egan wrote that Belasco was defeated by Tom Reynolds, a potato-salesman from Armagh, Ireland, after fighting a remarkable sixty-six rounds for one hour and twenty minutes. Rounds 30-33 were brutal to Belasco, and he received a mighty blow to his head, but after the thirty-fourth, Belasco planted so many repeated blows to Reynold's face that it began to swell, and his opponent's chances of recovering seemed to be fading. In the 59th, Reynolds eyes had been badly closed and swollen, yet he continued to connect with the occasional blow. In the sixty-first round, Reynolds had his swollen eyes lanced and came from behind for the next five rounds, seeming to lead the match, despite having been badly punished throughout. Finally in the sixty-sixth round, he landed a blow that sent Belasco down for the last time. Neither the Christian fans of Reynolds nor the Jewish fans of Belasco were entirely pleased with the outcome of the match, possibly due to its length and brutality, or by the manner in which the lead changed so unexpectedly in Reynold's favor at the end. Belasco had few matches of this length, or he would have likely not had as long a ring career. Born in 1792, Reynolds was a more experienced boxer five years older than Belasco.

Pierce Egan wrote that a Jewish boxer, Belasco, at only seventeen lost to Ned Brown on 27 July 1817 at Moulsey Hurst, but the combatant was Abey's brother Izzy, as he weighed only 114 pounds, less than Abey.

== Classic match with Jack Randall, Sept. 1817 ==
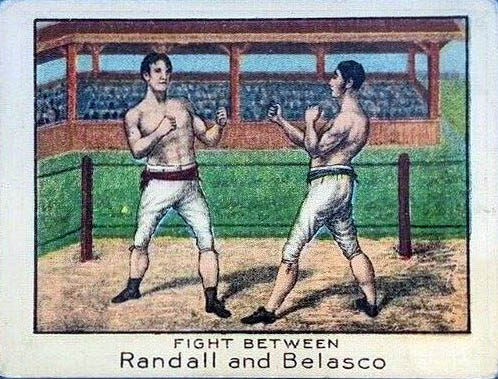
Randall (left) and Belasco

Belasco lost to his greatest adversary, Jack Randall, an incomparable English champion, on 30 September 1817, at Shepperton Range, Surrey, 15 miles southwest of London, for the substantial sum of 50 guineas a side. This figure would very roughly calculate to $5997 or £4850 in 2020. A sizable sum, but far less than a prize fight with the same size audience or interest would bring today, and not enough to secure a comfortable retirement, even if Belasco fought ten fights in his career with the same purse, which he did not. In an affirmation of Belasco's considerable reputation as a boxer, Randall, his winning record known, led in the early betting, but by close odds of only 11–10. Randall entered the ring at around 148 lbs. (67.13 kg), while Belasco weighed roughly eight pounds more. Belasco was known for his desperate and effective infighting, and was considered a skilled, scientific boxer. Randall's ability to go to the head to finish a fight was known to the crowd, and an integral part of his boxing strategy. Commencing five minutes before noon, the battle was fought in a standard 24 foot ring, under Broughton's rules, with no gloves.

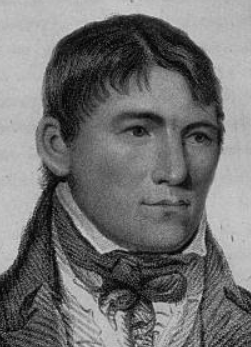
Jack Randall, circa 1818

Belasco from Famous Fights

As early as the first round, Randall went to the head, but Belasco, still fresh, countered effectively, and no blood was drawn. The first round was fought with great caution and with as few as four blows delivered, as both boxers were highly skilled and cautious of the other's ability, and it was known that the boxer who drew first blood would greatly affect the betting odds. Randall dominated the second round, drawing first blood with a blow to the mouth, and in the fourth turned the tide with a powerful left that penetrated Belasco's guard, putting him quickly down. Belasco was down in the fourth from a left from Randall. As late as the fifth, though trailing in the match, Belasco demonstrated one of his greatest strengths, skillful infighting to end the round, and floored his opponent, though Randall was still in command of the match. In a masterfully fought scientific match that drew great interest from the public, Randall faithfully worked Belaso's body before finally tasting victory after 54 minutes in the sixth. At this point in the match, it was clear to Pierce Egan that Belasco, "was a superior boxer in every respect than in his late (last) contest with Reynolds". The final blow was a powerful right to the eye of Belasco that rendered him senseless and ended the match. Belasco "staggered, fainted, and fell" from the pain, and though he was able to rise, his eye was closed completely shut.

Miles of Puglistica wrote of the match that "by the admirers of scientific efforts, ...of seeing a fight won without ferocity and gluttony...the fight between Randall and Belasco may be pronounced one of the most perfect specimens of pugilism ever witnessed." After dominating Belasco, Bell's Life in London wrote of Randall that "His hitting and getting away, his style of stopping and returning, with the excellent judgment he manifested, added to his activity and quickness on his legs, all tended to stamp him as one of the most finished boxers of his weight." According to Boxiana, Randal's ring name "The Nonpareil", implying that as a boxer he was unequaled or unrivaled, was earned in this match. Soon thereafter Belasco accompanied his friend Daniel Mendoza on an exhibition tour.

=== Matches in 1818 ===
He returned to the ring at Rickmansworth, Hertfordshire, on 10 June 1818, and lost a nine-round match to Cyrus Davis, a butcher's apprentice.

In the summer of 1818, he defeated the Winchcomb champion at the race course at Cheltenham in Gloucestershire for 20 guineas a side, winning in only twelve minutes. On 9 December 1818, he defeated Joe Townshend, in twenty-four minutes at Coventry, Warwick for a sum of 5 guineas. Townshend was believed to have weighed one hundred and sixty-eight pounds to Belasco's early weight of one hundred and fifty, but Belasco won the match quickly despite his disadvantage in weight.

=== Second match with Josh Hudson ===
Josh Hudson

He fought Josh Hudson, a butcher, for a second time on 19 July 1820 at Burney's Bowling Green in Norwich, to settle a dispute. The match lasted a considerable 35 short rounds taking forty minutes. The dispute involved Aby's brother Isaac, known as Izzy, also a boxer. Though the fighting continued for a while, Hudson injured his shoulder and both adversaries eventually ceased their hostilities. Belasco twice waited over a minute while his opponent's shoulder was reduced or relocated in its joint by his second so Hudson could continue the match. In the opinion of Puglistica, Belasco definitely had the better of the fight, but it was ill-advised as Hudson was somewhat inebriated when the fighting began, and may have never chosen to fight if he had been sober. Jack Randall, known as the "Master of the Rolls", and likely the best known English boxer of the period was a second to Belasco, and a significant crowd was likely in attendance.

=== Matches with Phil Sampson, 1819-23 ===
On Tuesday, 22 February 1819 he met Phil Sampson at Potter's Street in Essex for a more substantial 50 guineas a side, but the fight ended in an argument or wrangle, though Belasco collected the purse. On three other occasions he was matched against Sampson. In their second meeting, in London, on 29 February 1820, the contestants were separated after nine rounds. Both the third fight, a gloved affair, at the Tennis Court in Windmill street, London, on 21 December 1820, and the fourth on 25 August 1823, which was fought on Crawley Downs in Sussex, ended in the defeat of Belasco.

=== Match with Pat Halton, 1823 ===
He fought Irish boxer Pat Halton, a taller man at 5' 11" around 11 stone or 154 lbs. (69.8 kg) in weight, on 8 April 1823 at Harpendon Common in St. Albans, Herts, for 50 pounds a side. In the eleventh round, a dispute occurred as to the matter of a foul, when while falling, Belasco accidentally touched his knee to Halton when Halton was down. As a result, Halton's second, the boxer Jack Randall also noted the foul and took Halton out of the ring. The fighters had fought a total of twenty-seven minutes when the foul occurred. When Halton failed to resume the match, the fight was called in favor of Belasco, though fighting and disorder followed. Miles of Puglistica wrote that Belasco had clearly won by the tenth round, and the referees decided to call the match in his favor.

Not desiring to retire from the ring with a loss, Belasco met George Weston, on 25 May 1824 near Shepperton Range for the sum of 16 pounds. Miles of Puglistica describes this match as a nearly comic encounter and a mismatch in which Weston was knocked about the ring, and surrendered after only three rounds.

Belasco had marriages to three women; Hannah Gomes DaCosta with whom he had around seven children, Elizabeth, and Leah.

== Post boxing careers ==
At the end of his prize fighting career, Belasco made a living sparring and acting as a second to other boxers engaged in prize fights, and worked for a period as an L. V. or licensed victualer or food merchant. Shortly following, Belasco retired permanently from the prize-ring and opened a gambling-house, a job that kept him in contact with drinking and debauchery. He had also operated night houses and supper clubs, but they served the lower classes and were also frequently visited by drunks, requiring occasional visits by constables needing to keep order.

=== Support for Lionel de Rothchild, 1847 ===
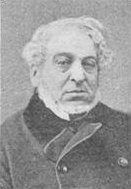
Lionel de Rothchild

Showing his support for the London working class and members of his own religion during the Parliamentary election of August 1847, Belasco and fellow Jewish boxer Barney Aaron led a lightly armed band of protestors with bludgeons patrolling and protecting the streets of London's East end in support of the election of the wealthy Jewish patron, and emerging politician Lionel de Rothschild to membership in the House of Commons for the city of London. Criticized for their brutish behavior and appearances, and said to "have gone about yelling and hooting in a fashion calculated to thoroughly disgust all whom it failed to terrify", Belasco and his followers were referred in a letter to the English newspaper the Liverpool Albion as "the lowest class of Jews in the east of London", and condemned for injuring the cause for which they marched. Though he won by a large margin, receiving 6792 votes, Rothschild would not be allowed to serve in Commons without taking a vow as a Christian upon a New Testament, which as a Jew, he refused to do. Several converted Jews already served in Parliament, as well as a few Jewish Sephardim. The event demonstrated Belasco's contributions to English society transcended boxing and entertainment. In 1858, the converted Jewish Conservative party politician Benjamin D'Israeli, as a leading voice in the House of Commons, reached a compromise that allowed Jewish members of the House of Commons to serve without taking an oath as Christians, though the House of Lords were allowed to continue to require the oath.

=== Descent into crime as public house owner ===
As late as 1 April 1830, he was charged with assaulting a Black man, Thomas Rastall at Bow-Street in London with a poker and required to appear in court. In May 1844, he was listed as the owner of the Sun and Star Public House in London, on Middlesex Street, formerly Petticoat Lane. In one account, his Pub or Gambling House may have housed a brothel. In fact, in September 1834, he was tried and convicted of "keeping a house of ill-fame" by the Middlesex Sessions, and sentenced to two years imprisonment, though the length of time he served is unknown. In late March 1834, his wife Leah had been convicted of keeping a brothel at Leg Alley in the Parish of St. Paul, but was required to serve only one year.

In May 1851, his brother Isaac, and son Joseph were charged with assault and cheating at a gambling house in connection with activities at their establishment, the Fountain Coffee house on Little-Catherine Street in the theatre district in London's West End, and a nearby coffee house on 4 Leicester Place. As late as 1854, Belasco was still working as proprietor of the Sun and Star public house, on London's Pettycoat Lane, but likely due to problems with the law his license was not renewed in the Spring of 1858.

In descending steps, he sank lower in the social order until, continually brought into conflict with the officers of the law, he lost all his friends, and died in nearly abject poverty in London, on 13 May 1859.

== Selected bouts ==
10 Wins, 5 Losses
Result	Opponent	Date	Location	Result/Duration	Notes
Win	Crib's Coal Heaver	Unknown	Unknown	30 mins	Decisive win; 5 guineas (GN)
Win	Josh Hudson	Unknown	Woolrich, Kent	2 hrs	In Egan's Boxiana
Win	Jack "The Butcher" Payne	3 Apr 1817	Moulsey Heath, Surrey	16 rnds	Received not a scratch
Loss	Tom Reynolds	23 Jul 1817	Moulsey Heath, Surrey	66 rnds, 1 hour, 20 mins	Reynolds badly battered But won in final rounds
Loss	*Jack Randall	30 Sep 1817	Shepperton Range, Surrey	6 rnds, 54 mins	Well fought; for 50 GN
Loss	Cyrus Davis	10 Jun 1818	Rickmansworth, Hertfordshire	9 rnds	
Win	Winchcomb Champion	Summer 1818	Cheltenham Racecrse., Gloucestershire	12 mins	For 20 GN
Win	Joe Townshend	9 Dec 1818	Coventry, Warwick	24 mins	Townshend weighed more; For 5 GN
Win	Phil Sampson	22 Feb 1819	Potter's street, Essex	Unknown	Ended in wrangle; 50 GN
Win	Phil Sampson	29 Feb 1820	London	9 rounds, both separated	May have been no winner
Win	Josh Hudson	19 Jul 1820	Burney's Bowling Green, Norwich	35 rnds., 14 minutes	To Settle dispute w/ Aby's brother Isaac
Loss	Phil Sampson	21 Dec 1820	Tennis Crt., Windmill St., Lond.	Unknown	Fought with gloves
Win	Pat Halton	8 Apr 1823	Harpendon Common; St. Albans, Herts	11 rnds, 27 mins	Halton quit; Won £50
Loss	Phil Sampson	25 Aug 1823	Crawley Downs, Sussex	Unknown	
Win	George Weston	25 May 1824	Near Shepperton Grange	3 rnds	Weston quit rnd 3
