= Richard Abbey =

American Methodist minister

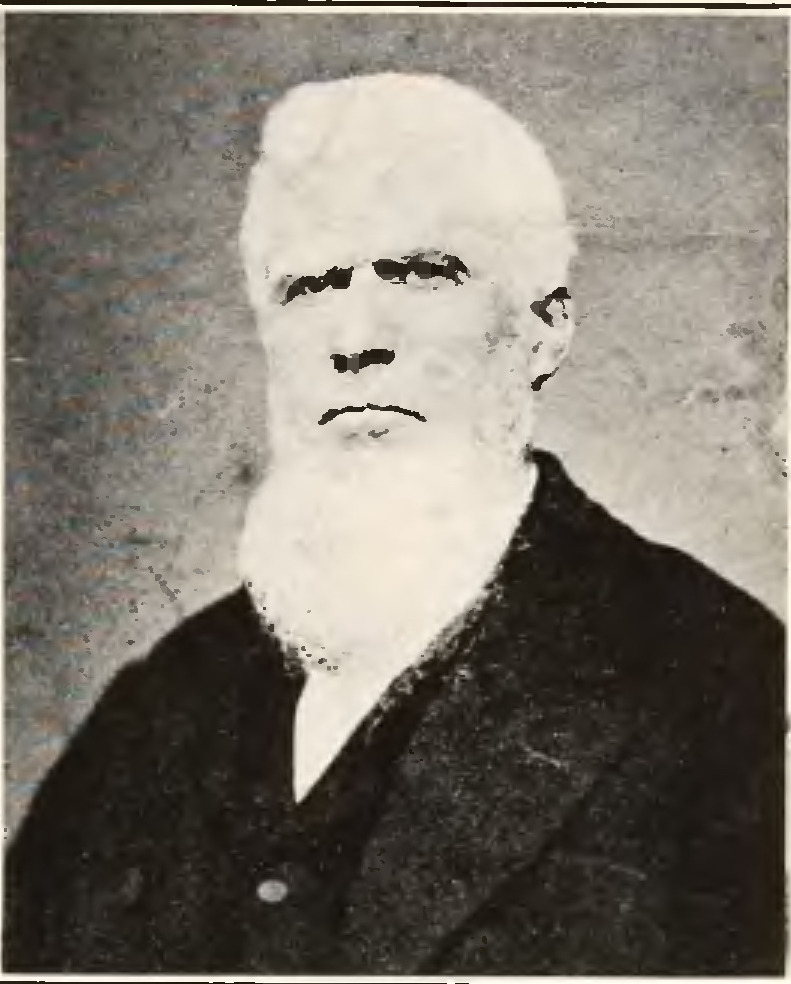
- Born: November 16, 1805; Genesee County
- Died: October 23, 1891 (aged 85); Yazoo City
- Occupation: Minister

Richard Abbey (November 16, 1805 – October 23, 1891) was an American Methodist minister.

Richard Abbey was born on November 16, 1805 in Genesee County. In 1825 he removed to Natchez, Miss., and became a minister in the Methodist Episcopal Church in 1844, and was identified with the movement separating that denomination into its northern and southern branches. He published Letters to Bishop Green on Apostolic Succession and End of the Apostolic Succession (1853); Creed of All Men (1855); Ecclesiastical Constitution (1856); Church and Ministry (1859); Diuturnitv (1866); Ecce Ecclesia, an answer to Ecce Homo (1868); The City of God and the Church-Makers (1872). In 1858 he was elected financial secretary of the Southern Methodist publishing house.

His other works include Baptismal Demonstrations, Divine Assessment, Strictures on Church Government, and The Divine Call to the Ministry. Richard Abbey died on 23 October 1891 in Yazoo City.
