= 3 FM =

Coordinates: 5°34′28″N 0°11′38″W

- Accra; Ghana
- Frequency: 92.7 MHz

Programming
- Language: English

Ownership
- Owner: MG Radio Limited; (Aewaha Company Limited)
- Sister stations: TV3

Links
- Webcast: http://3news.com/3fm/live

3 FM is a privately owned radio station in Accra, the capital of Ghana. The radio station is owned by Media General Radio Limited, which forms part of Media General, a media and communications company which owns several television and radio stations in Ghana.

== Staff ==
=== Presenters ===
- Godwin Asediba
- Giovani Caleb
