= Abbey, Devon =

Hamlet in Devon, England

Coordinates: 50°53′12″N 3°13′00″W

Abbey
- Hamlet
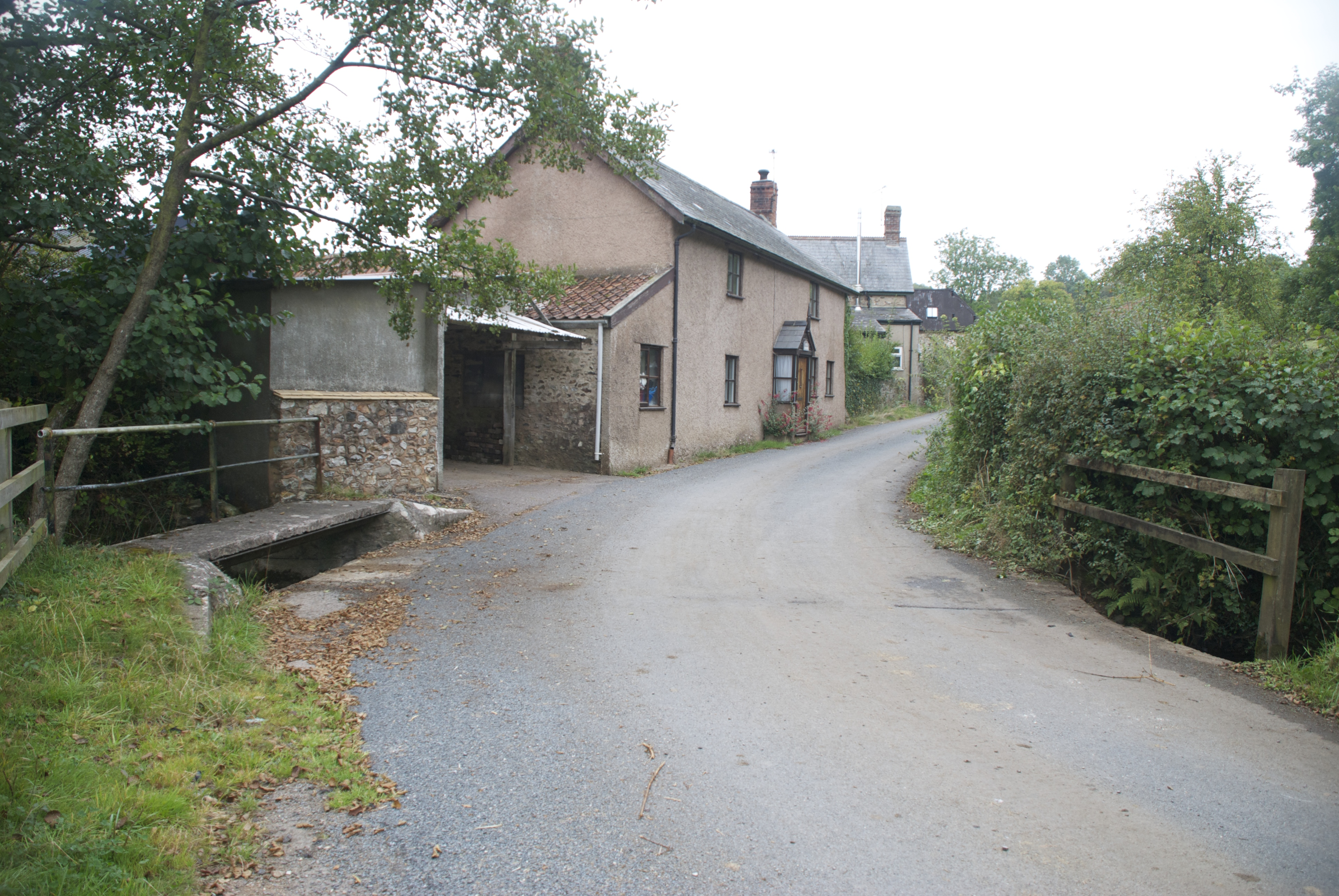
- The ford at Abbey

- Location within Devon
- OS grid reference: ST1410
- Civil parish: Dunkeswell
- District: East Devon
- Shire county: Devon
- Region: South West
- Country: England
- Sovereign state: United Kingdom
- UK Parliament: Honiton and Sidmouth

Abbey is a hamlet in the civil parish of Dunkeswell, in the East Devon district, in the county of Devon, England. It is located in the Blackdown Hills, a group of hills that border both Devon and Somerset. Dunkeswell Abbey is situated in the hamlet.

== Notes ==
- The geographic coordinates are from the Ordnance Survey.
