= Happy Sindane =

Notable South African (1985–2013)

- Born: Abbey Mzayiya; 25 June 1985
- Died: April 1, 2013 (aged 27); Tweefontein, Mpumalanga, South Africa
- Cause of death: Killed
- Parents: Henry Nick (suspected father); Rina Mzayiya (mother); Betty Sindane (caregiver); Koos Sindane (caregiver's father)

Abbey Mzayiya (known as Happy Sindane; 25 June 1985 – 1 April 2013) was a South African man known for claiming to be a white boy kidnapped by black people. He was raised in the village of Tweefontein, in KwaMhlanga, where he alleged he was mistreated, half-starved, and forced to live in poor conditions. He appealed to his supposed biological parents to come forward and reclaim him.

Sindane made headlines in May 2003 at the age of 16, when he laid a kidnapping case at the Bronkhorstspruit police station and reported being someone who was stolen from white parents as a toddler by a family domestic worker.

The story ended with an enquiry and a DNA test report in July 2003 that found Sindane was in fact the son of a black woman, Rina Mzayiya, who had died, and that his father was probably Henry Nick, a white man.

Sindane was of mixed-race and spoke Ndebele. He was raised by Rina's friend, Betty Sindane and her father Koos Sindane, his "grandfather", in KwaMhlanga.

He died in Tweefontein on 1 April 2013 after being stoned to death.

== Dulux paint controversy ==
In June 2003, Happy Sindane became a centre of attention and controversy when Dulux paints from South Africa used a photo of him, appearing above the tagline: "Any colour you can think of". Dulux and their advertising agency, Lowe Bull were taken to court amidst public outcry, and Sindane was awarded R100,000.
