= The Abbey (Daytona Beach, Florida) =

Historic house in Florida, United States

- U.S. National Register of Historic Places
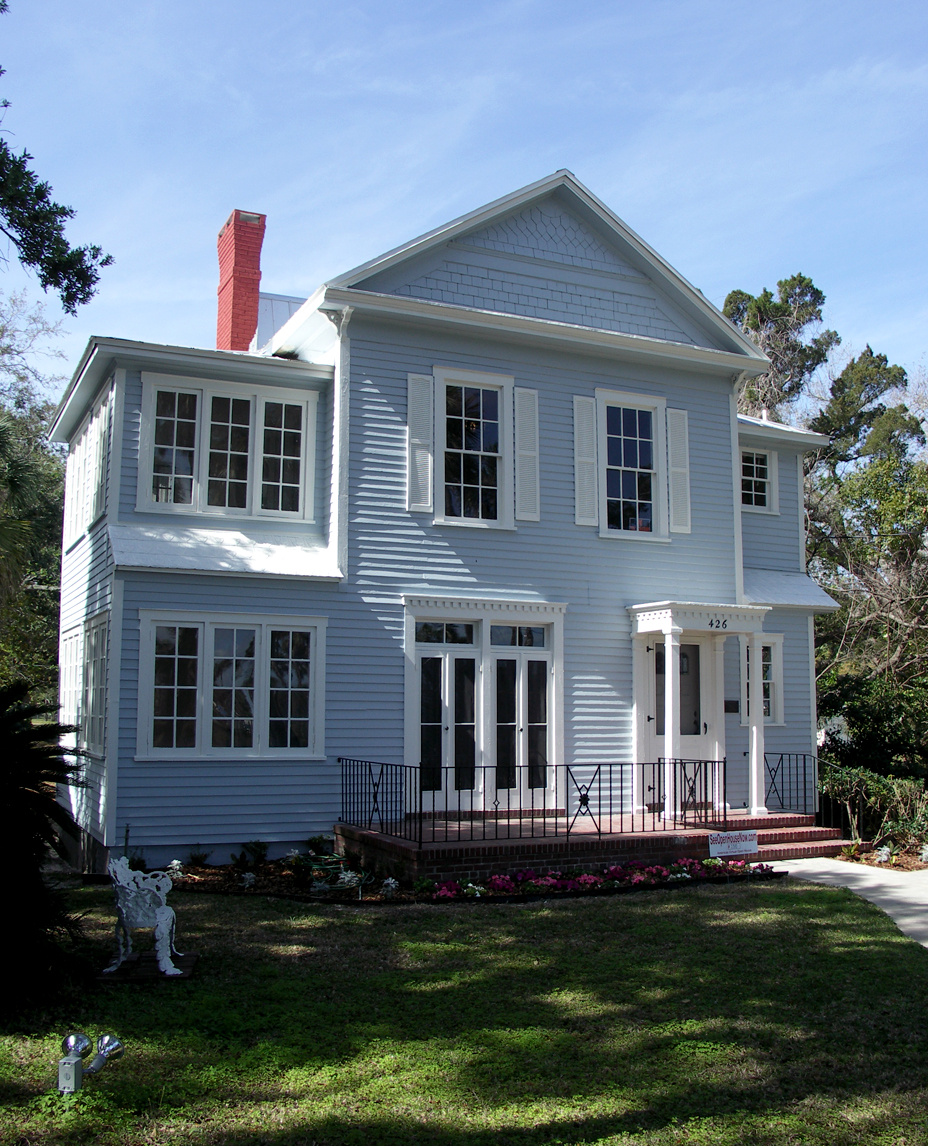

- Location within Volusia County
- Location: 426 S. Beach St., Daytona Beach, Florida
- Coordinates: 29°12′17″N 81°1′1″W
- NRHP reference No.: 87000615
- Added to NRHP: April 9, 1987

The Abbey (also known as Thompson's General Store or Rhodes House) is a historic site in Daytona Beach, Florida, United States. It is located at 426 South Beach Street. On April 9, 1987, it was added to the U.S. National Register of Historic Places.

== History ==
The Abbey was built in 1875 as the area's second general store, built and run by area businessman and long-standing town clerk and town council member, Laurence Thompson. While the vote to incorporate what was then simply Daytona was held at the area's first general store, the city incorporation papers were signed at the Abbey. It was, at various times, used as a church meeting room, a social hall, and a lending library. Laurence Thompson, who had by then moved into real estate and insurance, sold the property in 1891. In 1904, it was bought by Adelaide Rhodes, who heavily renovated the store into a residence, adding the two additions and peaked roof that give the structure its current look. Her son, Harrison Garfield Rhodes, prolific writer, playwright, travel writer and magazine editor, lived there seasonally from 1918 to 1929. The house was bought in 1955 by Dr. William Doremus, who applied for its place on the National Register of Historic Places in 1987.

On February 15, 2016, the Abbey Historical Trust held an event celebrating the building's 140th anniversary, where the City of Daytona Beach declared the day "Abbey Day" and the house was opened to the public from 1-5 PM.

== References and external links ==
- Volusia County listings at National Register of Historic Places
- Volusia County listings at Florida's Office of Cultural and Historical Programs
