= Abbey Fleck =

American engineer

Abigail (Abbey) M. Fleck is an American child inventor, born in St. Paul, Minnesota. She is known for her 1993 invention, Makin' Bacon, a microwavable bacon cooking plate. This device, which she created at the age of 8, is an inch-deep, dual compartment tray made of microwave-safe plastic, containing three T-shaped beams protruding up from the center. Abbey and her father, Jonathan Fleck, founded the A. de F. Ltd. company to manufacture this product. In 1996 their "microwave cooking vessel" was granted a U.S. Patent. Following an endorsement from Armour, Fleck embarked on a promotional tour of her product, which included appearances on The Oprah Winfrey Show, Late Night with David Letterman, and two features on Dateline NBC.
