= David Abbey =

English cricketer (born 1941)

David Robert Abbey (born 11 December 1941) is an English former first-class cricketer.

Abbey was born in Edmonton, Middlesex and played in two first-class matches for Middlesex County Cricket Club in 1967, as a right-handed batsman and a slow left arm orthodox bowler.

He currently resides in St. Merryn near Padstow in Cornwall.
