= Haumuri Bluff =

Palaeontological site in New Zealand

Coordinates: 42°33′30″S 173°30′30″E

Haumuri Bluff (also known as Amuri Bluff) is a headland on the coast of New Zealand's South Island on the south side of Piripaua (Spyglass Point), located several kilometres south of Oaro. It has been a major palaeontological site since the mid-19th century, and has lent its name to the Haumurian stage in the New Zealand geologic time scale. The bluff has also been the site of numerous shipwrecks.
