= Abbey (1853) =

Wooden brigantine wrecked in New South Wales

Coordinates: 31.84°S 152.76°E

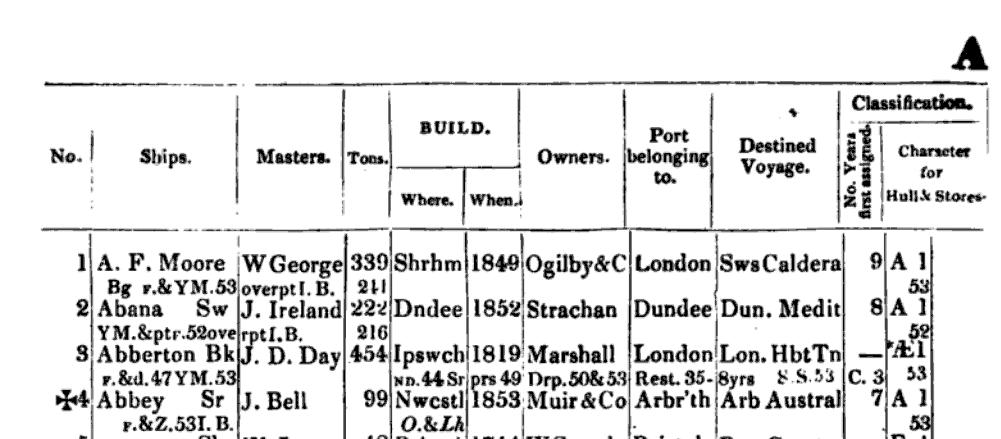
- Extract of Abbey (1853) Lloyd's Register of British and Foreign Shipping 1854 journal entry

History

New South Wales
- Name: Abbey
- Owner: John Phillips
- Port of registry: Sydney
- Builder: Unknown, Newcastle, County Down
- Completed: 1853
- Identification: Registration number: 52/1867; Official number: 31803
- Fate: Ran aground on 15 February 1868

General characteristics
- Type: Wooden brigantine
- Tonnage: 90 GRT; 90 NRT
- Length: 22.6 m
- Beam: 5.7 m
- Draught: 3.3 m

Abbey was a wooden brigantine that was wrecked at Crowdy Head, New South Wales in 1868.

== Career ==
Abbey was built at Newcastle, Ireland, in 1854. During the period 1858–1866, she was engaged mainly in the trade between Circular Head, Tasmania, and Hobsons Bay, Melbourne, carrying a cargo of general produce and items such as candles and soap. The ship's captain, James Crocket, made this journey at least five times between 5 July 1859 and the 7 May 1862.

Towards the end of Captain James Crocket's tenure, Abbey was being used in runs between Brisbane and ports such as Newcastle, New South Wales, the Clarence River and Port Frederick.

On 27 June 1866, Abbey was rammed by a cutter while at rest in the Brisbane River. A few months later, on 6 September, she was sold at a public auction in Melbourne, having had a "thorough overhaul".

In October 1866 the vessel sailed to Dunedin, New Zealand, under the command of T. W. Harrison. In 1867 the vessel made runs from Newcastle to Melbourne stopping on the return voyages at Sydney.

== Shipwreck event ==
On 14 February 1868, Abbey left Sydney for Newcastle. The following day, she ran aground three miles north of Crowdy Head, in a gale which claimed several other ships. She was insured for £800. The wreck was then sold by Messrs Bradley, Newton, and Lamb for the sum of £35.
