= Jeremy Rogers Limited =

British boatyard

- Company type: Limited company
- Industry: Yacht building
- Founded: 1961
- Founder: Jeremy Rogers
- Headquarters: Lymington, Hampshire, UK
- Key people: Kit Rogers
- Website: www.jeremyrogers.co.uk

Jeremy Rogers Ltd. is a British boatyard based in Lymington. Founded by English boatbuilder and sailor Jeremy Rogers in 1961, it is currently known for construction to order of the classic Contessa 32 design, and refurbishment of Contessa and other yachts. The yard is notable for the high quality handbuilding of the yachts, and the renowned seaworthiness of the designs compared to modern mass-production yards.

== History ==
The business was founded by Rogers in 1961, and by the early 1980s was employing 200 people in five factories in Lymington building the Contessa 26, Contessa 32 and the Doug Peterson designed Grand Prix 35s, 39s and 43s, and exporting the yachts worldwide. Although an insolvency forced production to stop, in 1995 the Contessa 32 moulds were bought back and production on a bespoke basis restarted. The yard currently offers refurbishment and parts support for Contessa yachts, as well as refitting of other yacht makes.

=== A 'Green' Contessa ===
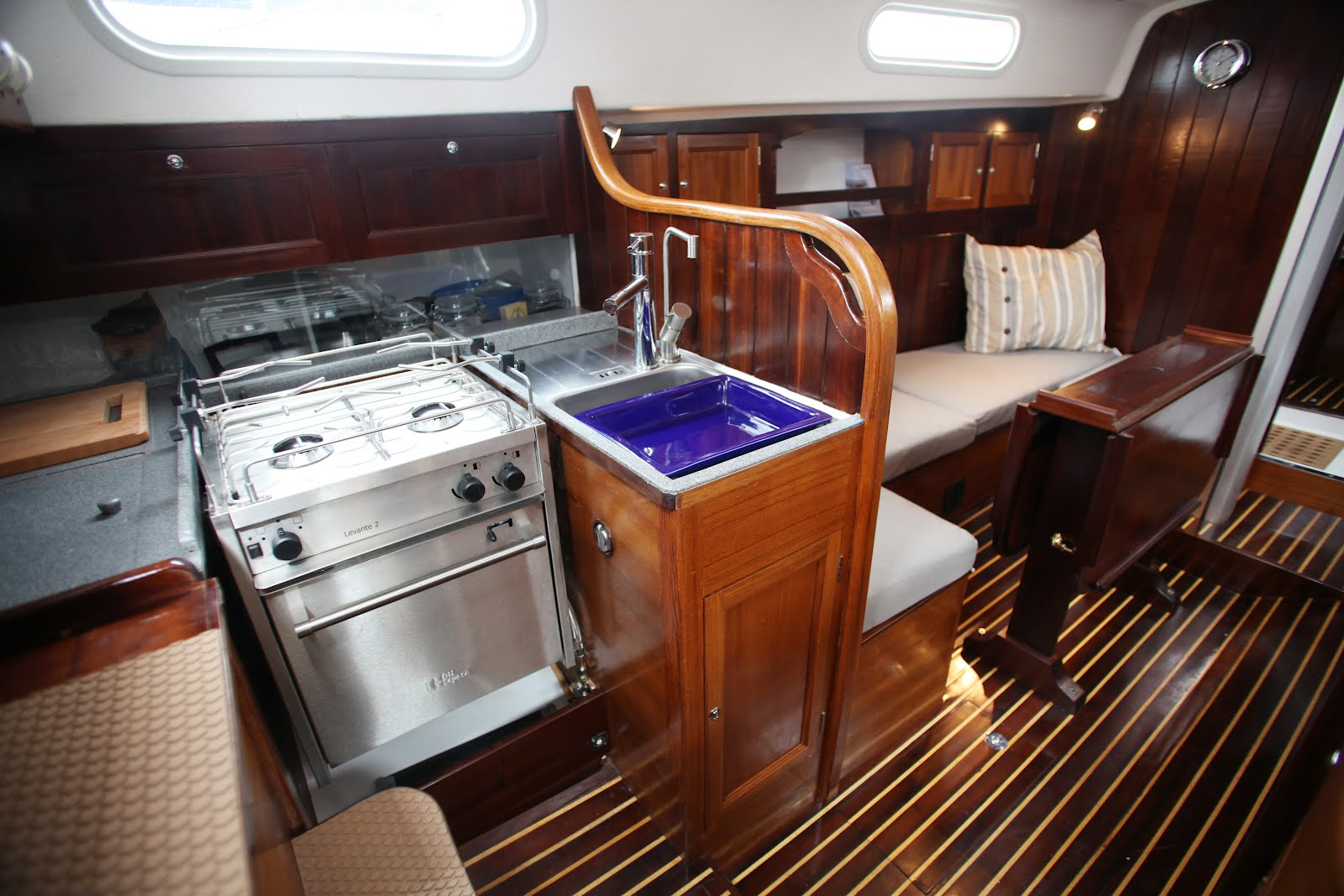
Saloon and galley of Calypso, showing the Kebony joinery.

2011, the 40th Anniversary of the Contessa 32, saw a renewed interest in new Contessa 32s after Rogers exhibited his new "greener" Contessa 32 Calypso at the Southampton Boat Show in collaboration with The Green Blue (a collaborative effort of the Royal Yachting Association and the British Marine Federation). Calypso showcased a variety of sustainable products and technology.

The deck and interior woodwork is made from sustainable 'Kebonised' maple rather than unsustainable tropical hardwoods such as teak and mahogany. A diesel-electric hybrid Beta 25 engine is used to lower fuel consumption, and a solar panel and wind generator are fitted. The deck is glued with Saba adhesive, which is solvent-free and unlike the more commonly used Sikaflex does not contain isocyanates which are linked to asthma and cancer. Linseed-based petrochemical-free Le Tonkinois varnish is used for the wood, and the hull is painted with Hempasil non-toxic antifoul.

== See also ==
- List of sailboat designers and manufacturers
- Contessa 26
- Contessa 32
