= Contessa 32 =

32-foot offshore keelboat

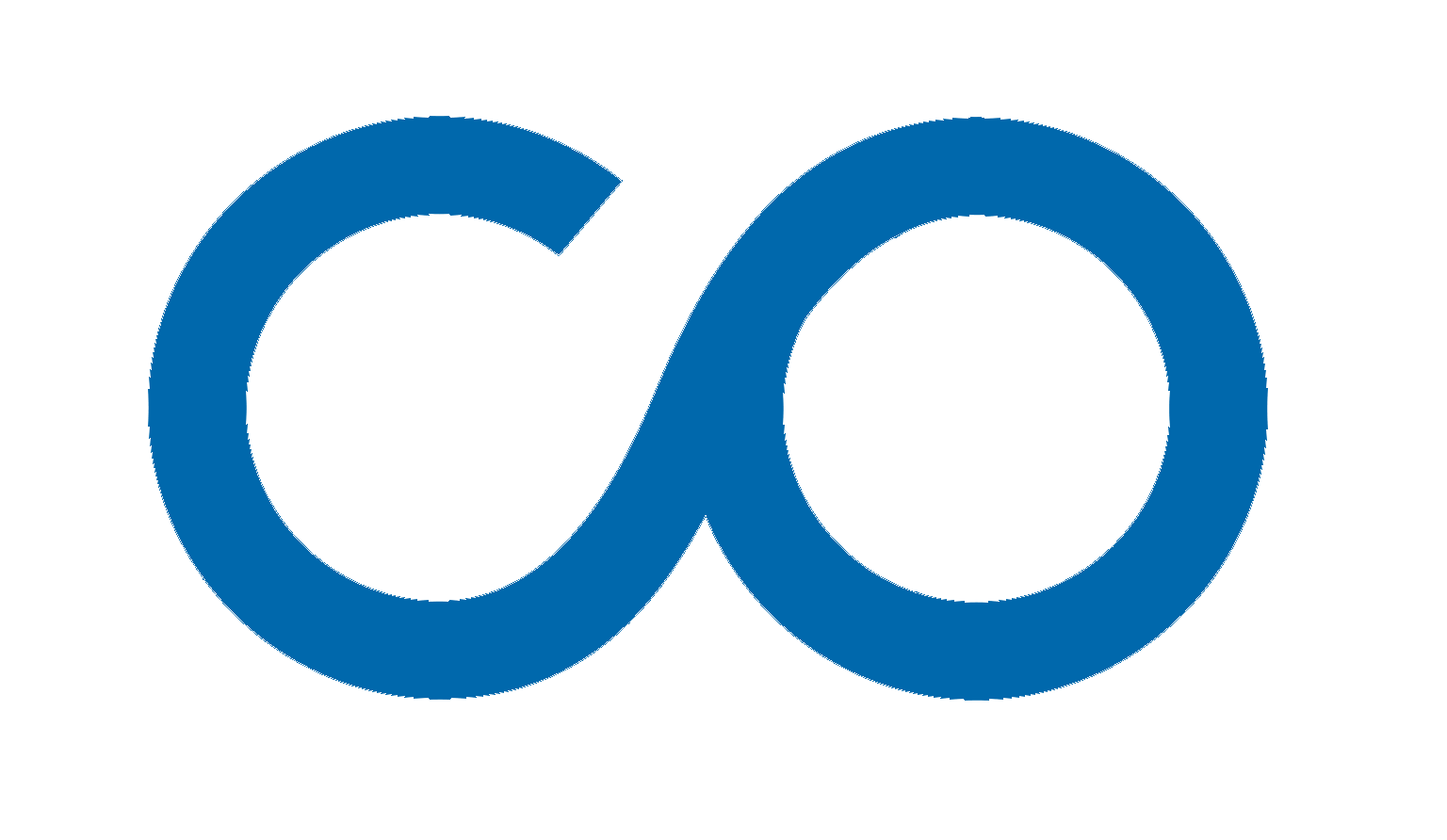
- Class symbol

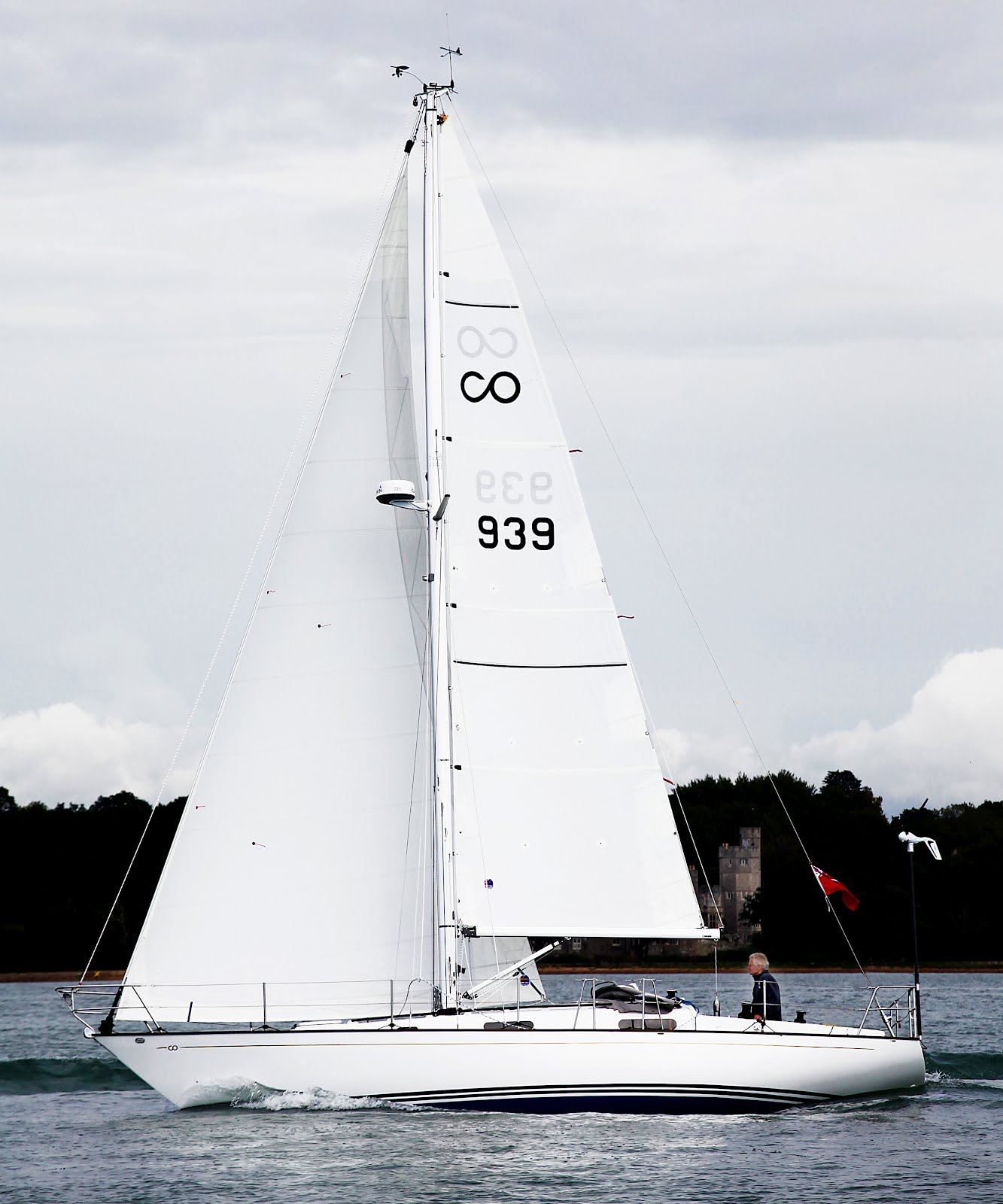
- Contessa 32 under sail

Development
- Designer: David Sadler
- Year: 1970
- Name: Contessa 32

Boat
- Crew: 1 to 7
- Draft: 5' 6"

Hull
- Type: Monohull yacht
- Hull weight: 9,520 lb
- LOA: 32' 0"
- LWL: 24' 0"
- Beam: 9' 6"

Hull appendages
- Keel: Fin & skeg

Rig
- Rig type: Bermudan sloop

Sails
- Total sail area: 562 ft^{2}

Racing
- RYA PN: 992

The Contessa 32 is a 9.75 metre (32 ft) fibreglass monohull sailing yacht, designed in 1970 by David Sadler in collaboration with yachtbuilder Jeremy Rogers, as a larger alternative to the Contessa 26. With over 750 hulls built, the yacht is among the widely produced one-design cruiser-racers of its class. The yachts have a masthead sloop rig, with a fin keel and a skeg-mounted rudder, a cutting edge concept for the period which now represents a cross between newer and older designs.

The Contessa 32 is seaworthy enough for offshore voyages in extreme weather conditions, but also performs well in races, and as a one-design racing class is administered by an active Association. The trait most often associated with the Contessa 32 though is its ability to endure harsh weather and rough seas. A Contessa 32 was the only yacht in the small boat class to finish the disastrous 1979 Fastnet race, in which 15 people died. Production by the Jeremy Rogers boatyard ceased in 1982, then restarted in 1996 and still continues. The qualities and long production span of the Contessa have given the yacht a dedicated 'cult' following.

== Production history ==
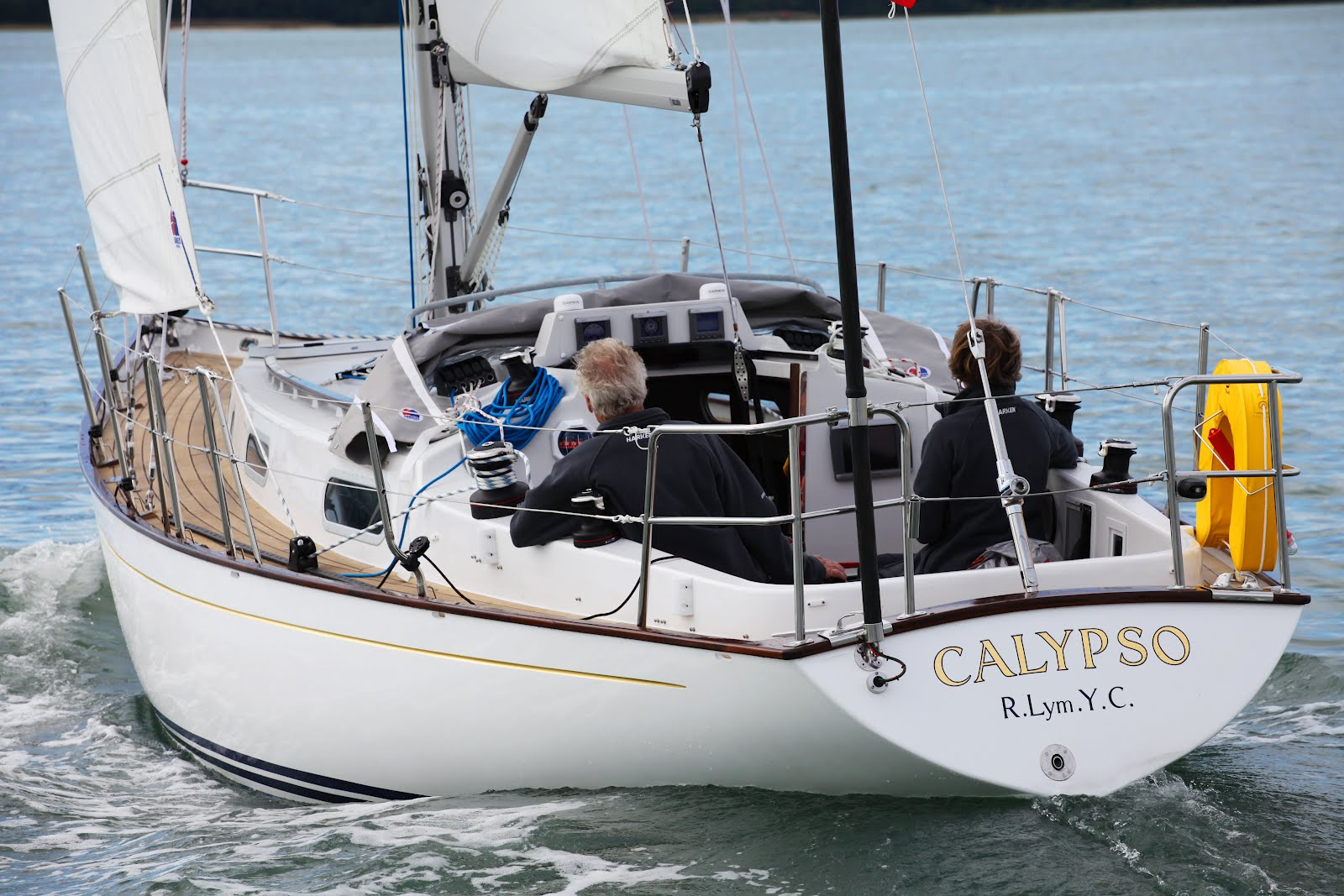
A Contessa 32 under sail, viewed from the port quarter.

The Contessa 32 was designed by David Sadler in 1970, in response to demand for a larger version of his popular Contessa 26 which had been launched by the Jeremy Rogers boatyard five years earlier. The first two hulls were moulded by Jeremy Rogers in the same year. The yacht was exhibited at the London Boat Show in 1971, and was an immediate success, winning 'Boat of the Show' and securing numerous orders. Demand rapidly outstripped production, and until new facilities were built the waiting list ran to two years. In the next decade, the Rogers yard built 500 Contessa 32s, and when production stopped in 1983 over 700 had been built, and had been sold around the world. Between 1973 and 1990, an additional 87 were built under licence by J.J. Taylor of Canada after a hull and deck were shipped out and a set of moulds produced. These 'Canadian Contessas' have various production differences; the tiller was replaced with a wheel, the rig was made 3 feet taller, more GRP mouldings rather than wood were used in the interior, and a coremat cored deck replaced the solid deck. At least two other Contessa 32s were built by MacBar Marine in Poole in 1986, and about 15 more were built between 1988 and 1995 by Mike Slack. In 1996, after rebuilding his bankrupt business from scratch, Jeremy Rogers was able to buy the moulds back, and after their restoration was able to resume production of the Contessa 32 on a bespoke hand-crafted basis. The first of these 'new Contessas', Wild Call, was built in the same year. By 2010 another 20 had been built, of which the Rogers family boat, Calypso, was exhibited at the Southampton Boat Show that year.

== Hull design ==
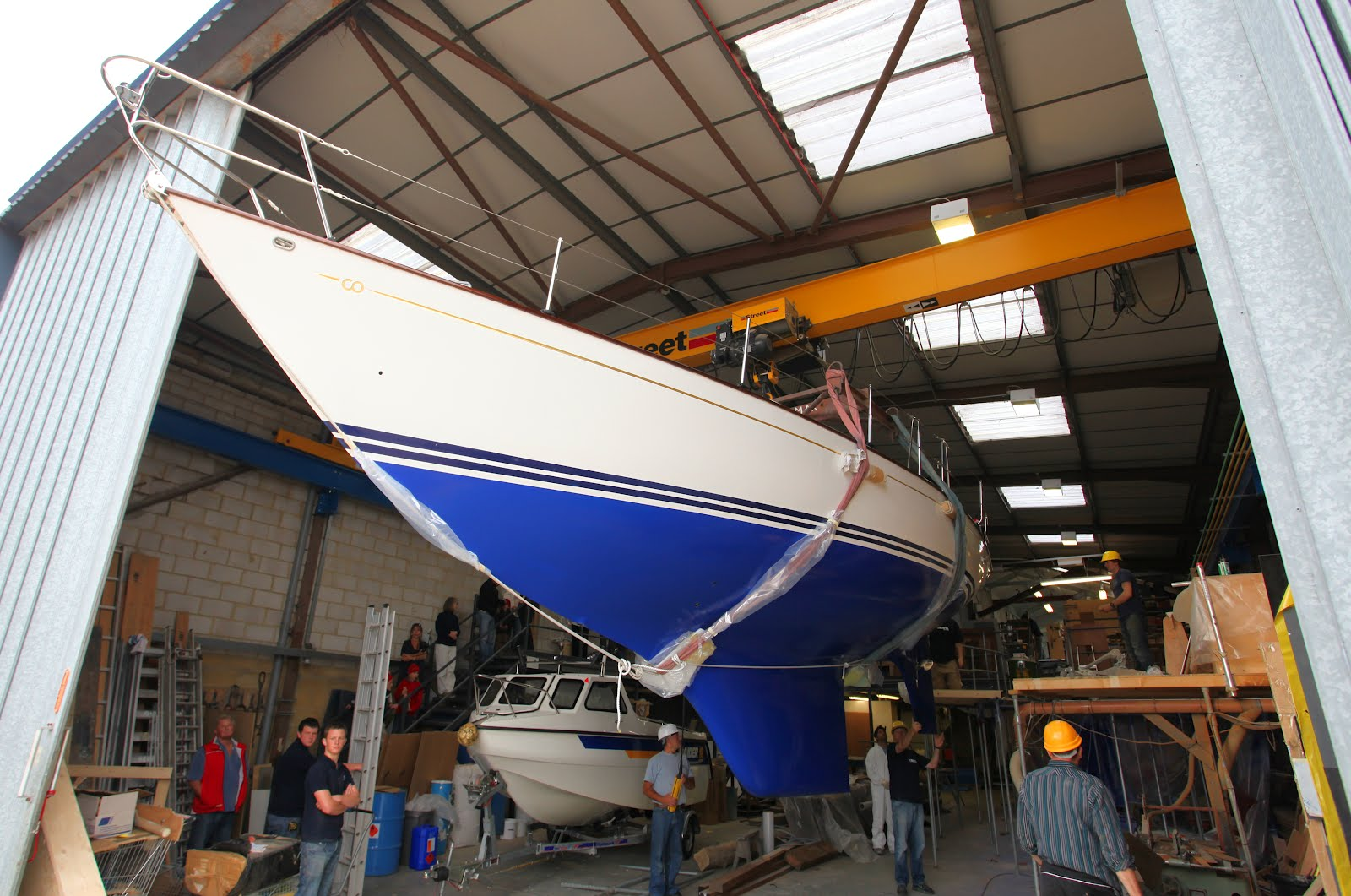
The underside of the hull, with fin keel and skeg visible.

The hull of the Contessa 32 is generally seen as a cross between older and newer designs. She has the well ballasted keel, low centre of gravity, and narrow beam of traditional English cutters, but has a fin keel characteristic of newer, lighter racing yachts. The narrow beam and substantial ballast provide a high degree of positive stability, with an AVS of 155°, although due to her small size the STIX is only 33. If knocked down or capsized, the Contessa readily rights herself. Because it is shorter than a full-length keel, a fin keel creates less drag. The blending of the keel into the hull forward captures the lateral stability of a full keel, and with the cut away aft portion lends greater responsiveness to the helm. While the skeg bestows additional lateral resistance to the hull aft producing directional stability, its robust design also supports and protects the rudder.

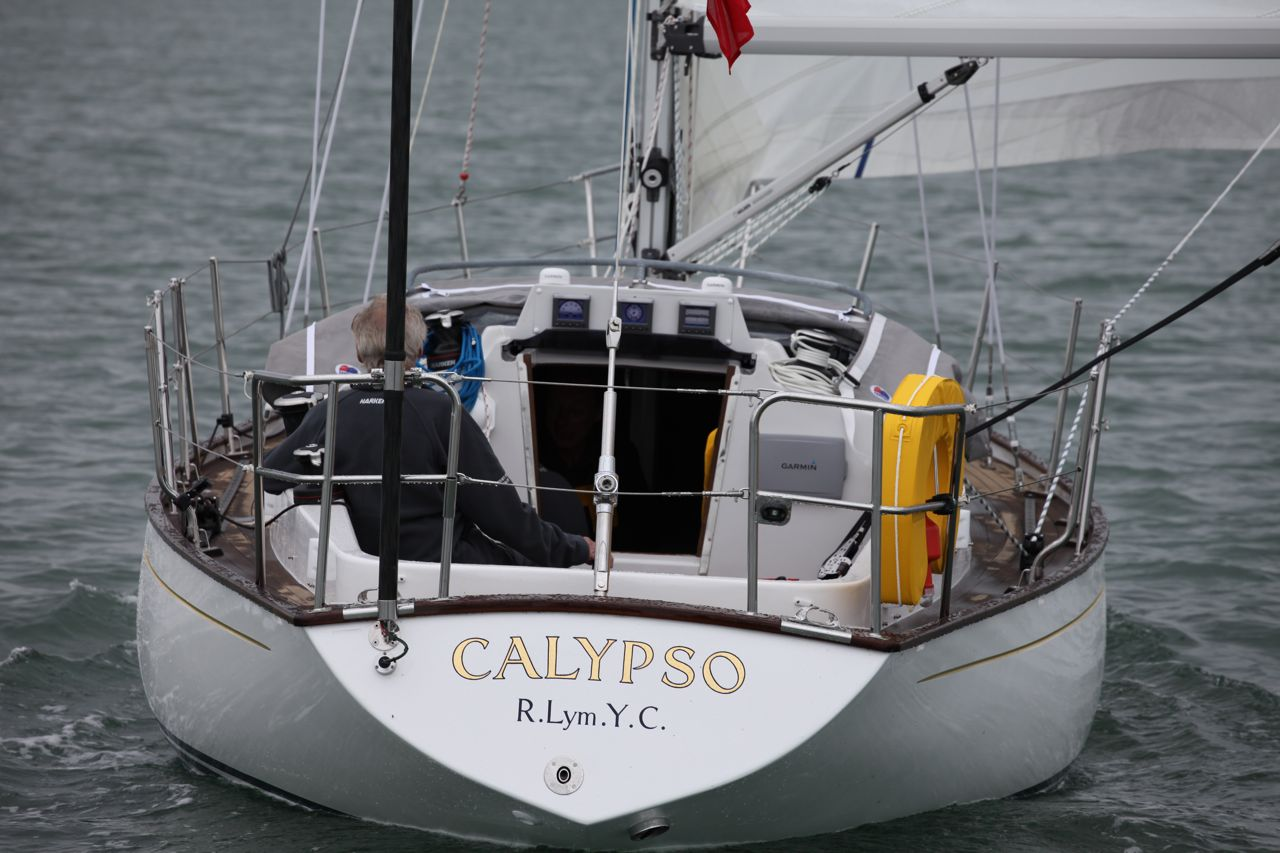
The stern, showing the reverse counter-stern design and the moderate tumblehome.

The hull is of conventional glassfibre construction, with a strong layup conforming to Lloyd's standards. The two tonnes of lead ballast is encapsulated in the hull, obviating the need for keel bolts. The hull is joined to the deck by a large bulwark, topped with a teak caprail. Unusually, the deck has no balsa core, instead using solid glassfibre construction. Although this makes for greater longevity of the hull as there is no core to rot or delaminate, a slight 'flex' can sometimes be felt. The mast is keel stepped, and is supported by double lower shrouds for greater redundancy. The standing rigging terminates at U-bolts in the deck. Although this type of chainplate is sometimes criticised, there is no recorded instance of a dismasting, and Rogers claims reinforcing this system would have no impact on safety. It has the benefit of simplicity and low cost.

The design owes much to the changes happening in yacht racing at the time. The transition was being made from the older RORC to the then newer IOR rule, and because of this the decision was made by Sadler and Rogers not to design the yacht 'to a rule', but simply to produce the best design. This means the Contessa avoided the sometimes extreme dimensions associated with boats designed to achieve a favourable rating rather than simply to perform well. As the design has lived through the transition from the IOR to the IMS, the IMS to the IRC, and increasing popularity of the ORC rule, the decision not to design to a rule has been thoroughly borne out, and the Contessa has gained a timeless, 'classic' aura.

== Cabin ==
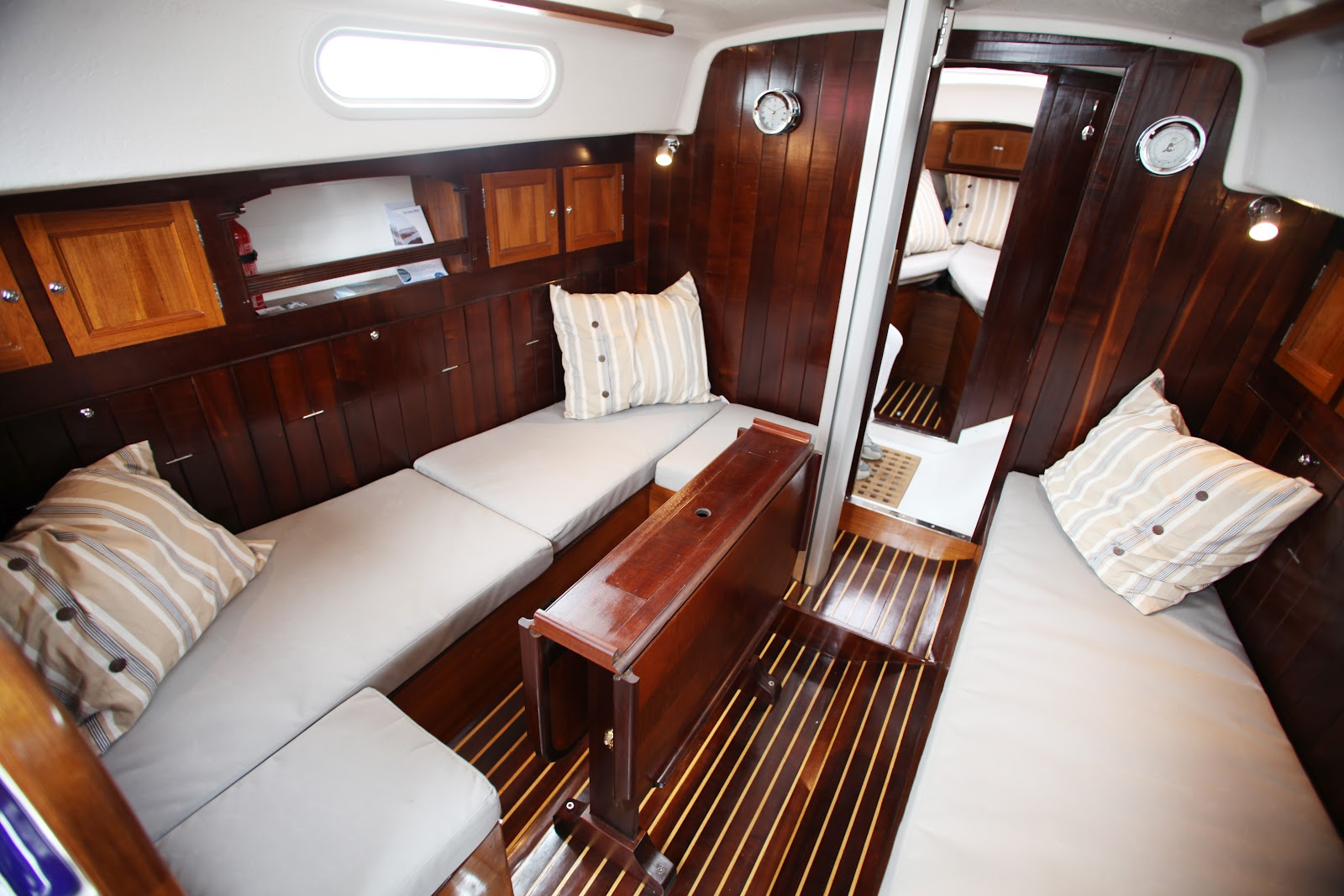
Saloon, with heads and forecabin visible.

The furnishings of the Contessa 32 cabin are typical of boats of her size and vintage. There is a V-shaped berth in the bow, followed by a small head (toilet) to port opposite a wet-locker and shower. The saloon (main cabin area) includes a folding table, with sofas that double as berths, the table lowering to convert the port berth to a double. At the aft end of the saloon next to the companionway, and to port, is a small U-shaped galley, consisting of a stove, sink (fed by an 18-gallon freshwater tank), and a counter. To starboard, there is a chart table, with a quarter berth extending aft of the navigators seat. An inboard marine diesel engine of 15 to 25 horsepower is mounted beneath the cockpit, fed by a 12-gallon fuel tank. Modern boats have a Beta Marine 20 or 25 horsepower engine with folding or feathering propeller, in conventional or hybrid configuration.

Though small in terms of accommodation in comparison with modern boats with wider beams and greater headroom, the compact cabin of the Contessa resulted from the low, narrow-beamed design that emphasized rough weather handling and seaworthiness at the expense of cabin space.

== A 'Green' Contessa ==
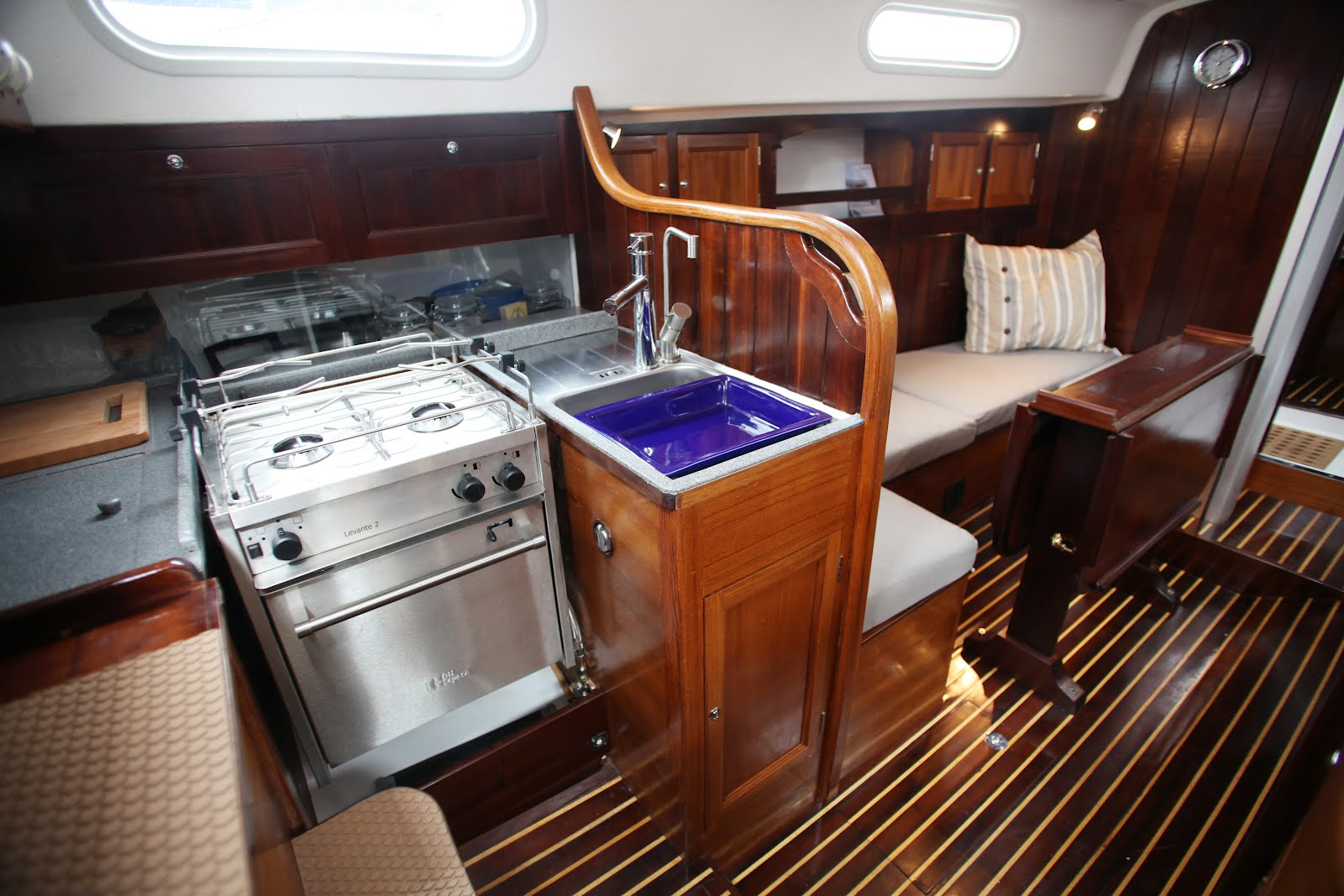
Saloon and galley of Calypso, showing the Kebony joinery.

2011, the 40th Anniversary of the Contessa 32, saw a renewed interest in new Contessa 32s after Rogers exhibited his new "greener" Contessa 32 Calypso at the Southampton Boat Show in collaboration with The Green Blue (a collaborative effort of the Royal Yachting Association and the British Marine Federation). Calypso showcased a variety of sustainable products and technology.

The deck and interior woodwork is made from sustainable 'Kebonised' maple rather than unsustainable tropical hardwoods such as teak and mahogany. A diesel-electric hybrid Beta 25 engine is used to lower fuel consumption, and a solar panel and wind generator are fitted. The deck is glued with Saba adhesive, which is solvent-free and unlike the more commonly used Sikaflex does not contain isocyanates which are linked to asthma and cancer. Linseed-based petrochemical-free Le Tonkinois varnish is used for the wood, and the hull is painted with Hempasil non-toxic antifoul.

== Racing ==
Despite being designed more than 50 years ago, the Contessa 32 is still active in yacht racing competitions. Among them there is a 'one design' season that consists of Inshore Series, National Championships, Cowes Week, and Round the Island Race. Within the IRC handicap system, the Contessa 32 manages to compete successfully with new boat designs, as can be seen from the result of the race Fastnet Race, where the family yacht Calypso ranked 12th in 2011 Round the Island Race.

== Operational history ==
In a review Michael McGoldrick wrote, "The Contessa 32 has a reputation as being one of the better 32 footers for weathering a serious gale, and rates right up there as one of the more seaworthy boats for bluewater cruising. In fact, it was the smallest boat to finish the infamous 1979 Fastnet Race (known as the deadliest race in history of modern yachting). The Contessa 32 is a no nonsense design that does not attempt to trade seaworthiness for a larger interior or to mimic apartment-like accommodations below decks. As a result, it is a little less beamy and roomy than many other 32 footers on the used market."

In 1984, in a Contessa 32 named Gigi, John Kretschmer and the owner, Ty Techera, sailed from New York City down to Cape Horn, rounding the Horn against the prevailing winds and currents, and sailed up to San Francisco. This was recorded in Kretschmer's book Cape Horn to Starboard. Gigi was then bought in Florida by Kley Hughes from Texas. She was sailed in the Gulf of Mexico on multiple coastal races and twice in the former "Regata de Amigos" which crossed the Gulf from Galveston, TX to Veracruz, MX. "Gigi" was then purchased and completely refurbished by builder Jeremy Rogers in 2007.

From 1979 to 1983, Declan Mackell sailed around the world alone in a Contessa 32 named Sean-Ois. In January 2003, Seb Clover, a 15-year-old from Great Britain, became the youngest person to sail across the Atlantic alone, in a Contessa 32 named Reflection. Also in 2003, the Contessa 32 Hurrying Angel won the Fastnet Race double handed division, crewed by Harry Allaway and Kathy Claydon. The most often mentioned exploit involving a Contessa 32, however, is the 1979 Fastnet race. A sudden storm of near hurricane strength brought death and destruction to the race, capsizing 25% of the 303 participating boats. Among the 58 boats in the smallest class (28 – 32 ft), only one managed to finish the race: a Contessa 32 named Assent, owned by Willy Ker and sailed by his son Alan.

In 2018/19, French sailor and philosopher Pierre-André Huglo completed the non-stop, round-the-world La Longue Route 2018 challenge in his Contessa 32 Fresh Herring, to celebrate the 50th anniversary of the legendary one-and-an-half circumnavigation by Bernard Moitessier for the Golden Globe Race 1968/69, after which the famous French sailor and writer Moitessier published La Longue Route, which Huglo cites extensively as his inspiration for his own circumnavigation, praising also the seaworthyness of his Contessa 32. Not only was she the smallest boat to complete the circumnavigation but also the first boat home in just 221 days 18 hours and 46 minutes. Huglo and his Fresh Herring repeated this successful circumnavigation a second time on the occasion of the second edition of La Longue Route, in 2024.

== See also ==
- Contessa 26
- S&S 34
- UFO 34 (yacht)
- Jeremy Rogers
- Jeremy Rogers Limited
