= Corvette Motoryacht =

British motor yacht

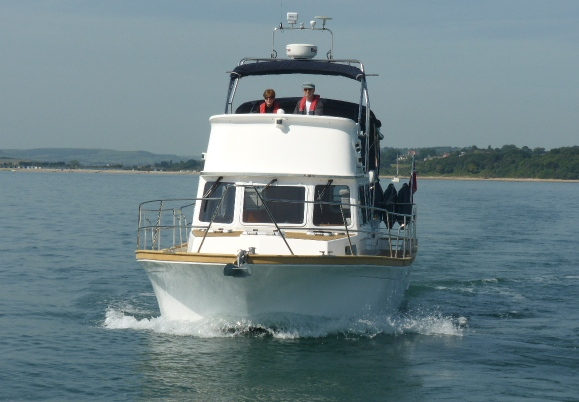
Corvette 320 motor yacht

The Corvette Motoryacht originally was a British-built "trawler-styled" motorboat with a nominal hull length of 32 feet (9.75m, SSR rating) and a beam of 13 feet (3.96m). The styling was traditional rather than contemporary, with a raised aft deck, wide walkaround side-decks, flybridge and fore & aft twin cabins, both with their own shower and toilet. Particular attributes were the spacious internal accommodation facilitated by the relatively wide beam and the full use of the two-level external deck space, providing comfortable social seating for eleven. The very wide one-level side decks also facilitated safe movement and working around the boat. Unusually for a trawler yacht, by virtue of its semi-planing hull design, speeds in excess of 20 knots were achievable, depending on the engines used. Twin engines were almost universally used, but there were some rare variants specially custom-built with a single engine in the 1980s. The Corvette was noted for its good sea-keeping qualities, by virtue of its somewhat unorthodox hull form. Production started in 1974 with the Corvette 32 and through a number of company changes and developments became the Corvette 320 and finally the 340, a development of the 320 based on the same hull but with a revised aft deck/cabin, when production moved to Taiwan in 2009 and continues currently. The Corvette is a hand-built boat of some exclusivity, only having been manufactured in relatively very small numbers for a boat of this type over its four decade history.

== History ==
=== Introduction ===
Corvette production has spanned five different companies since 1974. Manufacturing in the early days was not without its commercial problems, involving episodes of company liquidation, changing of ownership, changing of company premises and employee buy-outs. Corvette production was in the UK from 1974 to 2008 but then moved to Taiwan, where the current yard is based.The following summaries chart the progress and changes in these companies.

=== First Era: Corvette Marine, Lymington: 1974–1977 – Corvette 32 ===
Corvette production started in 1974 in Lymington by Corvette Marine with the introduction of a 32 ft British-built, "trawler"-styled family cruiser designed by naval architect, Terry Compton of Compton-McGill. This, however, was a trawler yacht with a difference. The Corvette 32 had a most unusual hull shape (round bilge sections flanked by shallow vee flats out to the chine). This semi-planing design gave the Corvette significantly better performance than normally achieved by the more traditional displacement hull used on this type of craft.

The engines favoured by the original builders were twin 106 hp Volvo Penta D32s, linked to sterndrives, and 105 hp Mercedes-Benz OM352s, with V-drives, top speed being about 16 knots in each case. This configuration generally required more use of the trim tabs to travel at the optimum angle. In the boats built in the 1970s, the aft cabin was quite limited, much of the space at the stern being taken up by the sterndrive or V-drive engines that were then installed, although there was still space on the port side for a double berth (the foot of which stretched under the after part of the saloon seating) and a small toilet/shower compartment. Access to the engines was via a door in the cabin.

The Corvette 32 exhibited at the 1974 Southampton Boat Show was priced at £25,500 ex VAT (equivalent in 2014 to about £269,000) with a pair of 106 hp Volvo Penta D32A diesel sterndrives. About 30 were made before the company went into liquidation in 1977.

=== Second Era: Corvette Cruisers, Nottingham: 1984–1991 – Corvette 32 and "Classique" branding ===
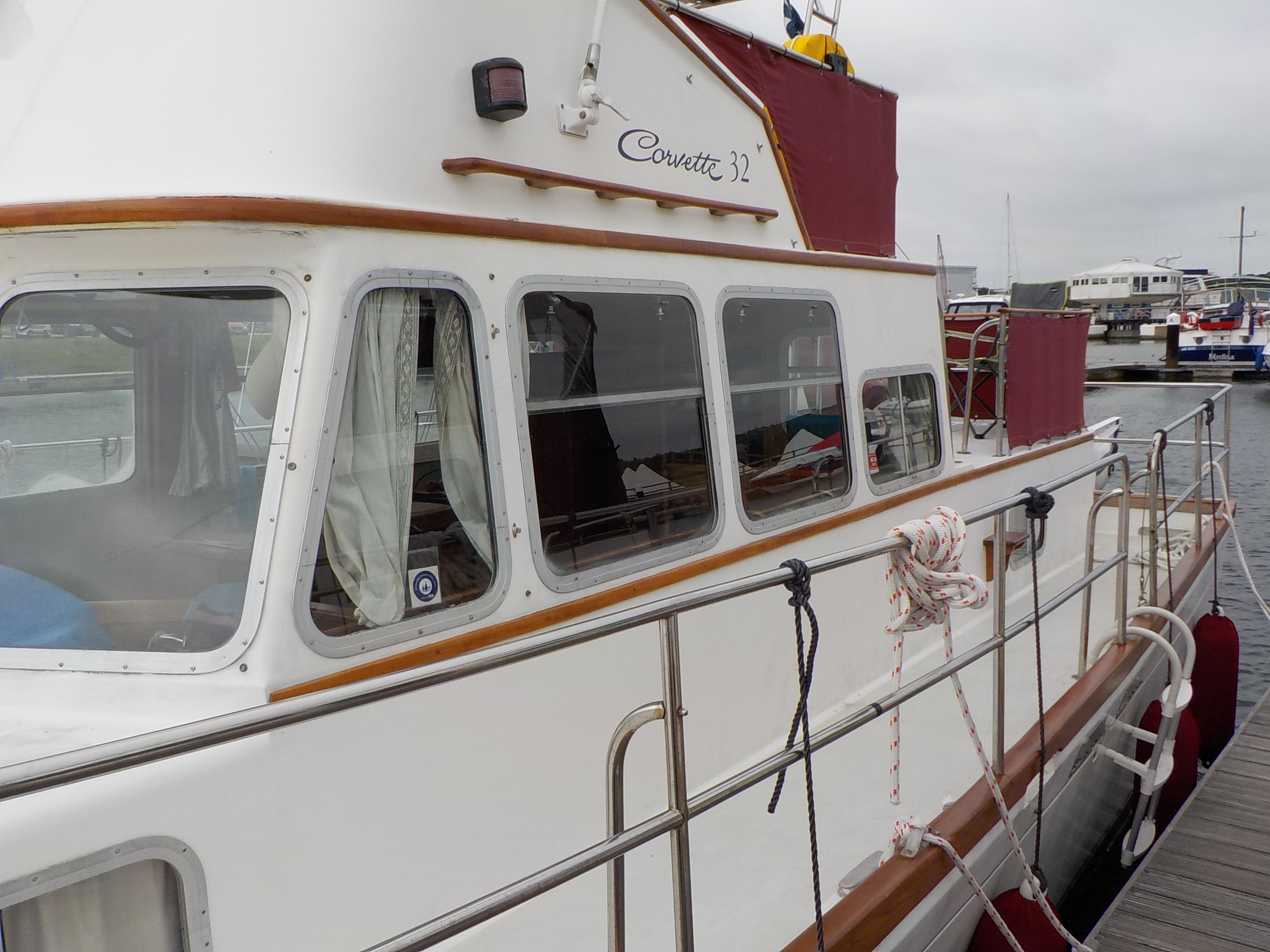
Corvette 32 probably from 1985 showing early half-height side window. In later models this was full height

In 1984 the moulds were bought by a new company, Corvette Cruisers of Nottingham, who redesigned the interior and built another 70 up to 1991. During that time significant changes were made to its design to improve handling and overall performance. The sterndrives or V-drives (which were only used on the first 10 boats) were changed to a traditional shaft system, with the engines being moved mid-ships for better weight distribution and enhanced sea-keeping characteristics. Thus, in boats built since the 1980s the aft cabin was an altogether more spacious affair. Corvette Cruisers also managed to increase the width of the front berths so they were big enough, at a squeeze, to sleep two people on each.

Corvette Cruisers offered a great variety of engine options, including Volvo TAMD41s up to 200 hp, which produced a top speed of 18-20 knots, and Cummins up to 210 hp, for 20-22 knots. A few single engine Corvettes were also specially commissioned. The shaft-driven Volvo Pentas were a great leap forward in handling, as the engine weight was no longer at the transom but centered around the middle of the boat. Whilst one would expect the craft with shaft driven installations to handle better at idling speeds, the rather small rudders fitted by Corvette Cruisers made them susceptible to being blown about in a strong wind. Handling at tick over, or when maneuvering in and out of locks or marina berths for example, was not one of their strong points.

The Corvette 32 displayed in 1986(?) by MDL Boat Sales, agents for Corvette Cruisers at that time, was priced at £51,300 ex VAT (equivalent to about £139,300 at 2023 prices) with two 105 hp Volvo TAMD30As working through conventional shaft drives.

Unfortunately the company's quality control was suspect and some of the Corvette 32s produced became as well known for their faults as for their excellent design. One of the biggest problems was rusting of the mild-steel fuel tanks that were fitted as standard. The engine air vents were not really large enough for the larger engines and a vacuum was being created in the saloon causing some air to be sucked in. Some rain and spray could enter through the windows and door, as well as through the engine air vents themselves. This water was absorbed by the foam beds surrounding the mild-steel tanks causing them to rust. Poorly fitted windows and doors contributed to this problem. Some of the boats were fitted with stainless steel tanks and these do not appear to have had any problems.

Other problems included poor engine alignment and teak decking that was poorly stuck down. There were also some local weak spots in the deck and superstructure. Corvette Cruisers made some modifications to improve the situation and added the suffix Classique to its name, probably to enhance their marketing. (There were models called the "Classique 600", "Classique 500", "Classique 420" and the "Classique 400" – these apparently referring to the total engine installed hp and not the boat length!). The company started to run into financial difficulties at this time and there was some cost cutting in materials and fittings. None of these problems was insurmountable and whilst the company was still trading, some owners had their problems corrected under warranty, including fitting new fuel tanks.

Corvette Cruisers built two variants on the same hull shape in the late 1980s, one called the Corvette Mediterranean and the other the Corvette Europa. It is thought they only built two each of these boats (1 Mediterranean is known of, based in Ireland; 2 Europas are known of: one is in France and the other is in Kent). The Europa had no flybridge and low air draft (2.6m) for canal use. The Mediterranean featured a large aft deck area in lieu of the aft cabin. An extension to the flybridge afforded some protection from the sun. Corvette Cruisers built about 70 boats, before they too went into liquidation in 1991.

=== Third Era: Seacoral Motor Yachts, Reedham: 1992–1994 – Corvette 320 ===
In 1992, the company changed hands from Corvette Cruisers Nottingham to a new owner, Michael White of Seacoral Motor Yachts of Reedham. They changed the model name to Corvette 320 and set out to resolve the quality issues and build boats that would ensure the continuance of this exceptional trawler yacht. It was not long before Seacoral were producing a far superior vessel terms of construction, engineering and overall finish.

The Corvette 320 that Seacoral took to Southampton in 1992 was priced at £94,300 ex VAT (equivalent to about £177,000 in 2014) with two 200 hp Volvo TAMD41s.

Volvos and Cummins were fitted by Seacoral as standard and in some of the boats they exported to Japan they increased the size of the engines to a combined 600 hp of Cummins or Yanmar.

Seacoral also improved handling at idling speeds by adding 3in to the length of the rudders.

Seacoral took advantage of the change of engine specification and siting, to make the double bed in the aft cabin larger and swivel it round at an angle from the port corner creating a walk-around oval bed and more room in the toilet/shower area and more stowage space. (In later years, the double berth standard was against the side wall with the island berth an option. Although the island berth allowed access from both sides, it intruded somewhat into the floor space of the cabin but ultimately remained a personal choice). They also rounded off a lot of the sharper corners throughout the accommodation and dispensed with the balustrade rails to the shelves. The boat's level of performance caught the attention of journalists and avid cruisers, and the popularity of the Corvette 320 grew.

Seacoral had built 12 boats when in 1994 the owner decided to leave the boatbuilding business.

=== Fourth Era: Corvette Marine, Reedham: 1995–2008 – Corvette 320 ===
2008 Corvette 320, the last one to be made at the Reedham yard

There was an employees' buy-out by Rod Nixon and Steve Robson in 1995, who then founded and renamed the company Corvette Marine, which ran until 2008. The popular 320 continued to be refined, resulting in a series of enthusiastic press reviews and solid sales throughout Europe and Japan. The quality improvements started under the Seacoral banner continued and the hand-built boats produced at the Reedham factory were of the highest standards in boatbuilding. The Corvette Europa (referred to above in the "second era") was also shown in their 2002 and 2006 brochures as an alternative model, yet it is uncertain whether any were actually made since the 1980s. They also undertook re-fits of earlier boats. Their customer service aftercare was legendary, and there are many accounts of customers who have been impressed by the quality of service and help that was available at that time.

The most popular choice of engine from the early 2000s up until 320 production finished in 2007/8 was the 315 hp Yanmar 6LPA (or in some cases this engine's predecessor, the 250 hp Yanmar 6LP-DTE, which was basically based on the same marinised Toyota 4.2 litre engine as the 6LPA except with 2 valves/cylinder rather than 4 as on the 6LPA). The 330 hp Volvo D6 was also an option in the later 2000s and a few boats used the Perkins Sabre 265. (More details on engine options are given in the section on "Standard specifications", below)

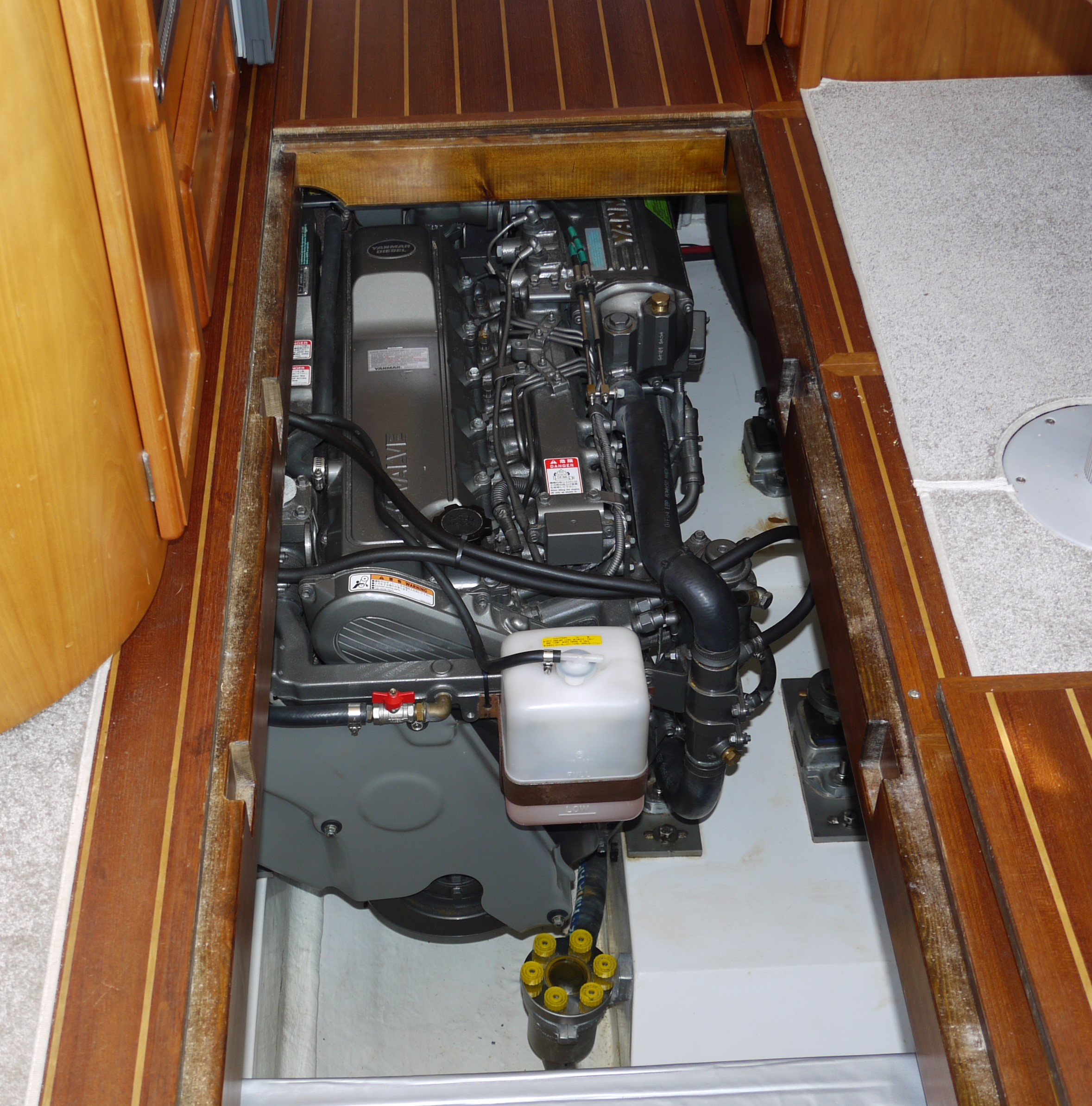
Yanmar 6LPA engine installation in a Corvette 320

The downturn of the global economy and the unique challenges of the hard-hit boatbuilding industry caused Corvette Marine to close its doors in the UK in 2008. New construction of the Corvette 320 ceased as of 2007/8, the last UK-built 320 being commissioned in October 2008. 46 Corvette 320s were made by this company, Corvette Marine.

=== Fifth Era: Corvette Marine (HK), Taiwan: 2009–date – Corvette 340 ===
Following the closure of the Reedham yard, the Fleming team of Cowie and Shard stepped in, and production of an all-new model, the Corvette 340, began in 2009–2010 at the Tung Hwa yard in Taiwan. Although using much of the 320's infrastructure, including the original hull, the 340's most significant change was the creation of a full-width aft cabin with a central island berth. This, together with other developments, added some 1200 kg to the displacement, but the main hull dimensions remained the same (as can be seen in the later table). The full-width aft cabin, however, came at the price of compromising the single-level walkaround decks which many 32 and 320 owners appreciated and now became two-level, rising to the aft deck height, which now spanned the full beam. There were other minor changes to the hull at the stern, adding a cavitation plate and modifying the exhaust outlets. (These are detailed in the Design section below). Tung Hwa's craftsmanship is highly respected throughout the boating world, being associated with the Fleming Yachts brand, and has proved instrumental in adding to the overall quality of the Corvette. The iconic Corvette Motoryacht thus continued in the form of the new 340 model, produced alongside Fleming Yachts, but to date (2017) only 5 have been made. Also, to date (2017) no Corvette 320s have been made in the Taiwan yard. The standard engine package offered for the 340 is twin Yanmar 6LP-STP (315 hp) although the Cummins QSB 5.9 litre 330 hp is available as an up-grade.
