= Sadler 25 =

The Sadler 25 is a 7.42-meter (24 ft 4 in) fiberglass sailing yacht, designed in 1974 by David Sadler of Great Britain as an evolution of his earlier Contessa 26 which was in turn an evolution of the Nordic Folkboat. Although both the Folkboat and the Contessa 25 had relatively narrow long keel hulls, Sadler's new design utilised a wider hull to give more form stability and the (then) new finkeel together with a skeg-mounted rudder.

Built between 1974 and 1981, the Sadler 25 was normally rigged as a masthead sloop, and was offered with the option of deep or shallow fin keels, twin bilge keels or a centre plate.

In its deep-fin configuration, the Sadler 25 was a successful cruiser-racer which quickly became popular in yacht clubs throughout the U.K., and completed Round Britain and Trans-Atlantic voyages.

The Sadler 25 is widely regarded as one of the classic late-20th-century production yachts, and many examples are still giving faithful service both cruising and racing.

== Specifications ==
LOA: 7.42 m (24 ft 4 in)
LWL: 5.84 m (19 ft 2 in)
Beam: 2.67 m (8 ft 9 in)
Draft (fin keel): 1.42 m (4 ft 8 in)
Draft (shallow fin): 1.16 m (3 ft 10 in)
Draft (bilge keel): 0.99 m (3 ft 3 in)
Draft (centre plate): 0.7 m/1.5 m
Displacement: 1814 kg (4000 lb)
Ballast Ratio: 47%
