= Jeremy Rogers =

British yacht builder and racer (1937–2022)

Jeremy Charles Rogers MBE
- Born: 16 September 1937; Thaxted, Essex, England
- Died: 12 October 2022 (aged 85)
- Occupation: Boatbuilder

Jeremy Charles Rogers, MBE (16 September 1937 – 12 October 2022) was a British boat builder and sailor, based in Lymington, Hampshire, and the manager of the Jeremy Rogers Limited boatyard.

During his 50-year career Rogers was responsible for the construction of a large number of well-known yachts and established himself as a first-class yachtsman.

== Early life ==
Evacuated to rural Canada during the Second World War, Rogers and his brothers passed the long winters making model boats, but it was back in England that Rogers built his first proper dinghy at the age of ten whilst at Clayesmore School in Dorset. Then, after serving his apprenticeship with Jack Chippendale MBE as a traditional wooden boatbuilder, he set up in business in 1961 at the age of 23. Despite his training in wooden boatbuilding, he was one of the first to appreciate the potential of glass-reinforced plastic (GRP), and he went initially into the production of GRP dinghies, followed in 1966 by a modified GRP Folkboat called the Contessa 26. This was an instant success, as was the subsequent Contessa 32, designed in collaboration with David Sadler.

== Seventies heyday ==
The Contessa 32 was voted the London Boat of the Show in 1972, and with approximately 650 of them already in the water, demand is such that after 40 years the yacht is still in production.

By the late 1970s and early 1980s, Rogers' company included five purpose-built factories in Lymington and a workforce of nearly 200 employees. Production included Contessas ranging in size from the traditional 26 to the Doug Peterson designed grand prix 35s, 39s and 43s, many of which were exported to a worldwide market. In 1978 and conjunction with the late Colin Chapman's Lotus car team, Rogers developed vacuum assisted resin transfer moulding, which was used on the Doug Peterson designed OOD 34.

== The sailor ==
Apart from boat building Rogers has made a significant contribution to the world of yacht racing. In 1974 he skippered his Contessa 35, Gumboots, to take the international One Ton Cup trophy, but in so doing he and his crew took time out of one of the offshore races to rescue a family from a sinking life-raft – for this he was voted Yachtsman of the Year (and the international racing rules were subsequently changed to allow for redress in such circumstances).

In 1977 and 1979 he and his crew competed as members of the British Admirals Cup Team, and in '77 Rogers' Contessa 43, Moonshine, was the top scoring boat.

Admirals Cup Yachts must compete in the Fastnet Race as part of the series, but in the 1979 Fastnet race this ocean race encountered near hurricane conditions, which caused one of the worst disasters in yachting history: many yachts were lost and 15 people died during the race. Consequently, the race results were understandably insignificant, but Rogers' Contessa 39, Eclipse, came in second overall to Ted Turner's Tenacious, a yacht twice her size.

The following year Rogers received his MBE from H.M. the Queen at Buckingham Palace.

== Later life and death ==
After setting up in business again following the bankruptcy of his original company, Rogers has concentrated on building new Contessa 32s and the complete refurbishment of many of the other boats built at the former yard.

Two of these refurbishments were his own Contessa 26, Rosina of Beaulieu, and Contessa 32, Gigi. Rosina, sailed by Rogers and his three sons, was uniquely three times winner of the coveted Gold Roman Bowl for overall winner of the Round the Island Race in 2002, 2003 and 2006.

Gigi had become famous in 1984, when she was sailed by Americans, John Kretschmer and Ty Techera, in record time around Cape Horn; Kretschmer then wrote Cape Horn to Starboard about the adventure. Rogers purchased Gigi in 2005 and restored her to new condition.

Rogers died from complications of Alzheimer's disease and COVID-19 on 14 October 2022, at the age of 85, during the COVID-19 pandemic in England.

== See also ==
- Jeremy Rogers Limited
- Contessa 26
- Contessa 32
