= Sadler 29 =

British sailing yacht designed by David Sadler

The Sadler 29 is a popular British sailing yacht designed by David Sadler. Over 400 Sadler 29s were produced. In April 1988 the Sadler 29 was the oldest design to take part in Yachting World’s Mini Rally.

== Construction ==
The hull is made of GRP with a full GRP inner molding, the space between these skins is filled with polyurethane foam, this meant the boat is unsinkable in the event of taking on water. If the boat should become full of water she should still float according to the famous Archimedes principle. The old naval wartime experience that "your ship is your best lifeboat" helps explain why designers thought that there was a need for an unsinkable yacht to promote further safety at sea. Fire could still sink such a vessel, this method of construction should be viewed as one of the many design features that can help promote safety-at-sea. For more information see International Convention for the Safety of Life at Sea.

== Measurements ==
- L.O.A. (excluding rudder) 28' 5"
- L.W.L. 22' 10"
- Beam 9' 6"
- Draft (fin keel) 5' 0"
- Draft (shallow fin) 4' 0"
- Draft (bilge keels) 3' 8"
- Displacement 8,200 lb
- Ballast 3,400 lb
