= David Sadler (yacht designer) =

- Born: 13 February 1921; Tollesbury, Essex
- Died: 5 March 2014 (aged 93); Bay of Islands, New Zealand
- Occupation: Yacht designer
- Notable work: Contessa 26, Contessa 32, Sadler 25, Sadler 29, Sadler 32

David Sadler (13 February 1921 – 5 March 2014) was a British yacht designer who was responsible for a number of classic production yachts during the period from 1960 to 1980. His designs include the Contessa 26, the Contessa 32, the Sadler 25, the Sadler 29 and the Sadler 32. The Contessa 32 is his most successful design, with over 750 built.
