= Contessa 26 =

Fiberglass monohull sailboat

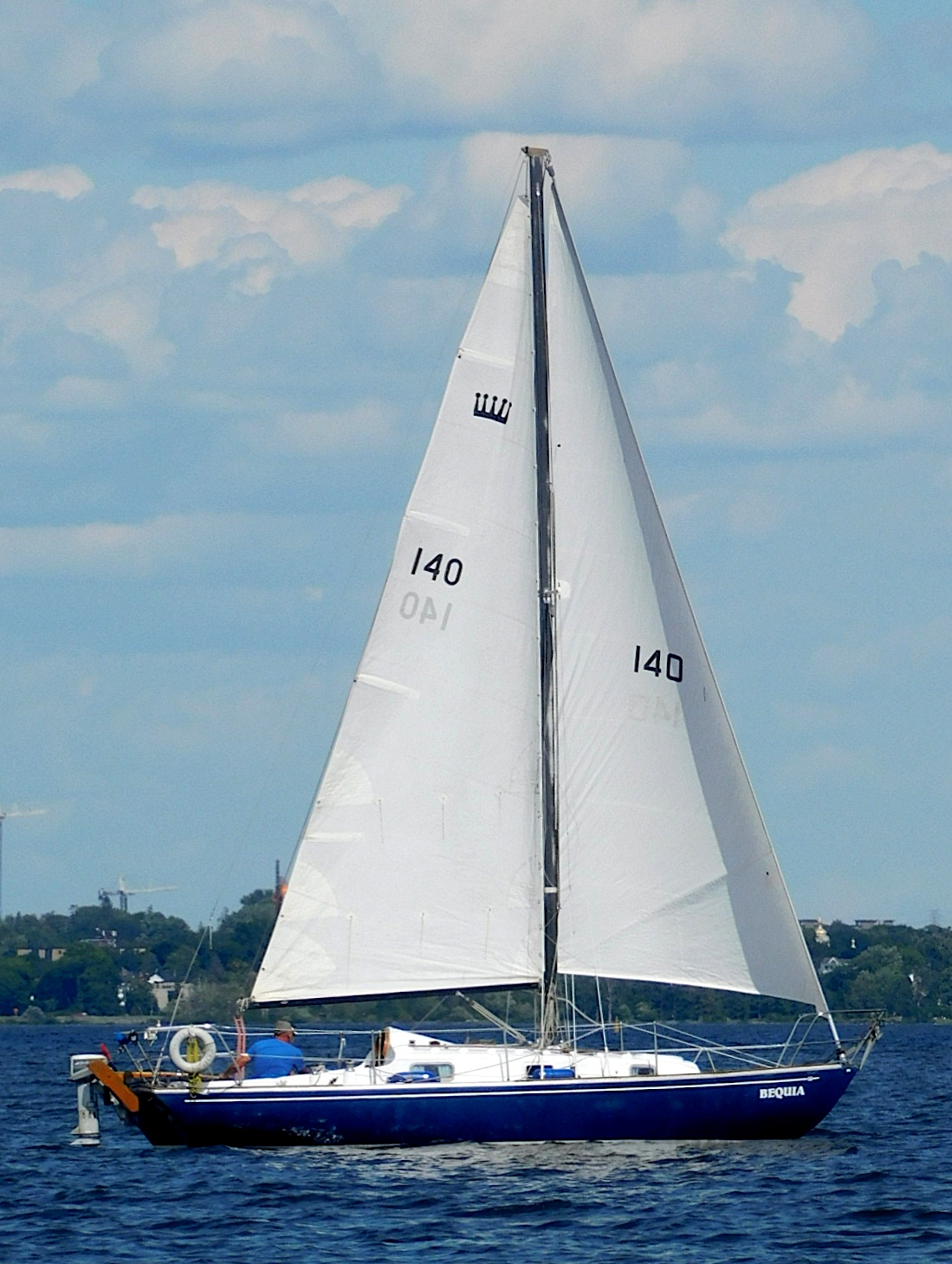

Development
- Designer: David Sadler
- Year: 1966

Boat
- Crew: 1 to 5
- Draft: 4' 0"

Hull
- Type: Monohull keelboat
- Construction: Fibreglass
- Hull weight: 5,400 lb
- LOA: 25' 6"
- LWL: 20' 0"
- Beam: 7' 6"

Hull appendages
- Keel: Long keel

Sails
- Mainsail area: 120 ft^{2}
- Jib/genoa area: 184 ft^{2}
- Spinnaker area: 440 ft^{2}
- Upwind sail area: 304 ft^{2}

Rating
- RYA PN: 1168

The Contessa 26 is a 7.77 metre (25.6 ft) fiberglass monohull sailboat, brought about when Jeremy Rogers, with a background in traditional wooden boatbuilding along with one of his Folkboat customers, David Sadler, created a modified version of the same boat in glass reinforced plastic (GRP). Rigged as a masthead sloop, with a long keel and a hull-mounted rudder, the Contessa 26 was launched in 1966 and early boats proved to be very successful racers, including long-distance events. Jeremy Rogers Limited went on to produce the Contessa 32.

== Design evolution ==
The design characteristics of the Contessa 26 comes from the Nordic Folkboat which was conceived by the Royal Gothenburg Sailing Club in 1939 as a new one design class for the masses which would provide more accommodation for the cruising family than the traditional Dragon Class. This idea effectively spawned a competition organised by the Swedish Sailing Association in 1940 that attracted 58 entries. Choosing one winner proved difficult so the final design was effectively decided by committee and Tord Sundén was commissioned to draw a boat based upon designs from Sweden's Jac Iversen and Denmark's Kned Olsen. Sometimes named the VW of the seas, the Folkboat concept was the same as Porsche's Volkswagen: to make a car/boat that was appealing across a wide section of society. In 1942 the Folkboat was as much a creation of the century of the common man as the bicycle. It's one of the most popular designs of all time and Loibner says there are more than 4,000 still around. With her graceful lines, acutely raked transom and easily handled rig, she proved almost as fast as a Dragon, and considerably more seaworthy.

== Production history ==
The Contessa 26 was first manufactured by Jeremy Rogers in Lymington, England in 1966. The Rogers boat works built approximately 350 Contessa 26s from 1966 to 1977, after which the moulds were sold to Chris Carrington of Maclan Marine, Lymington, who produced a few more during 1977/8. Another set of moulds was shipped to Canada, where they were built until 1990 under licence by J. J. Taylor & Sons Ltd. of Toronto. J.J. Taylors built another 400 or so boats, originally being sold as Contessa 26s, but after 1984 being called J J Taylor 26s - some of these later boats had a slightly modified deck moulding with an enlarged 'hump' by the hatchway to give greater headroom, and a slightly revised interior layout, although the hull always remained the same.

== Major race results ==
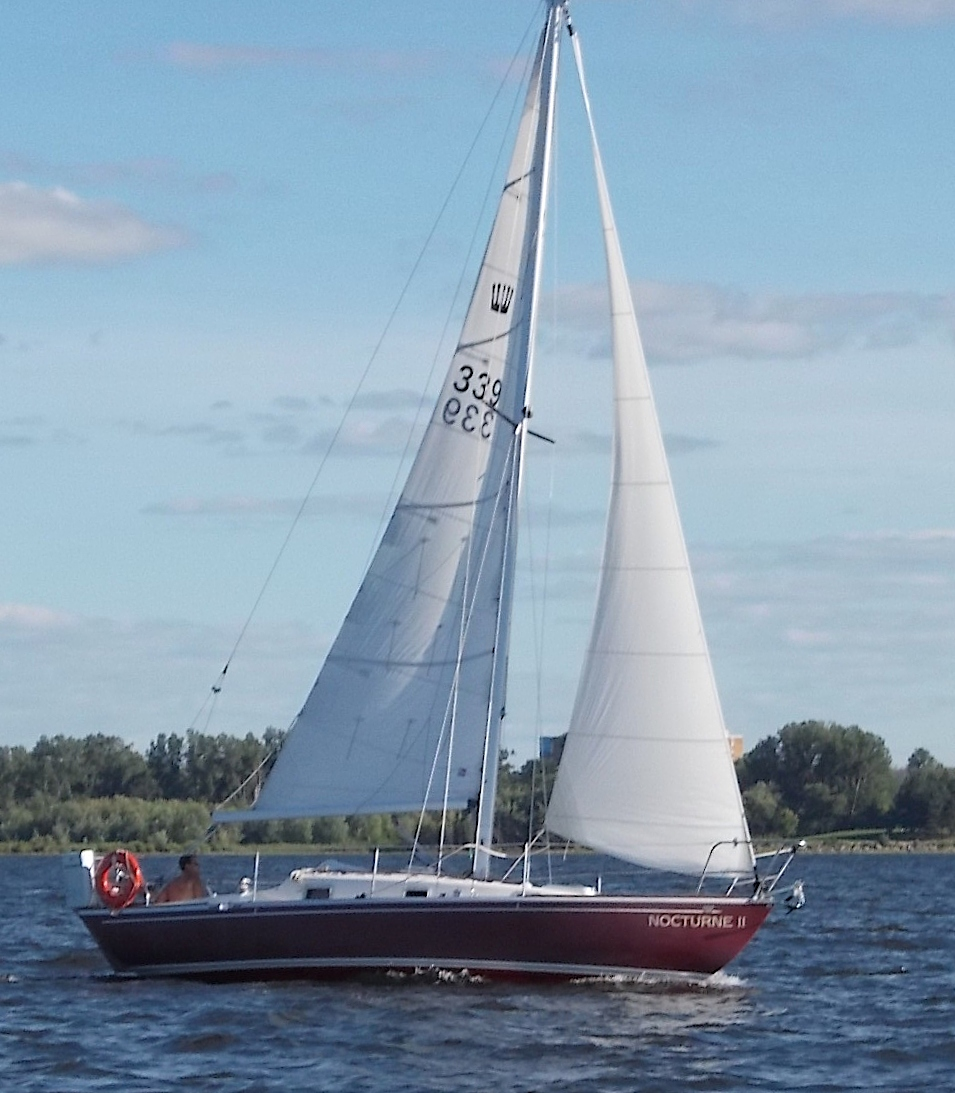
Contessa 26

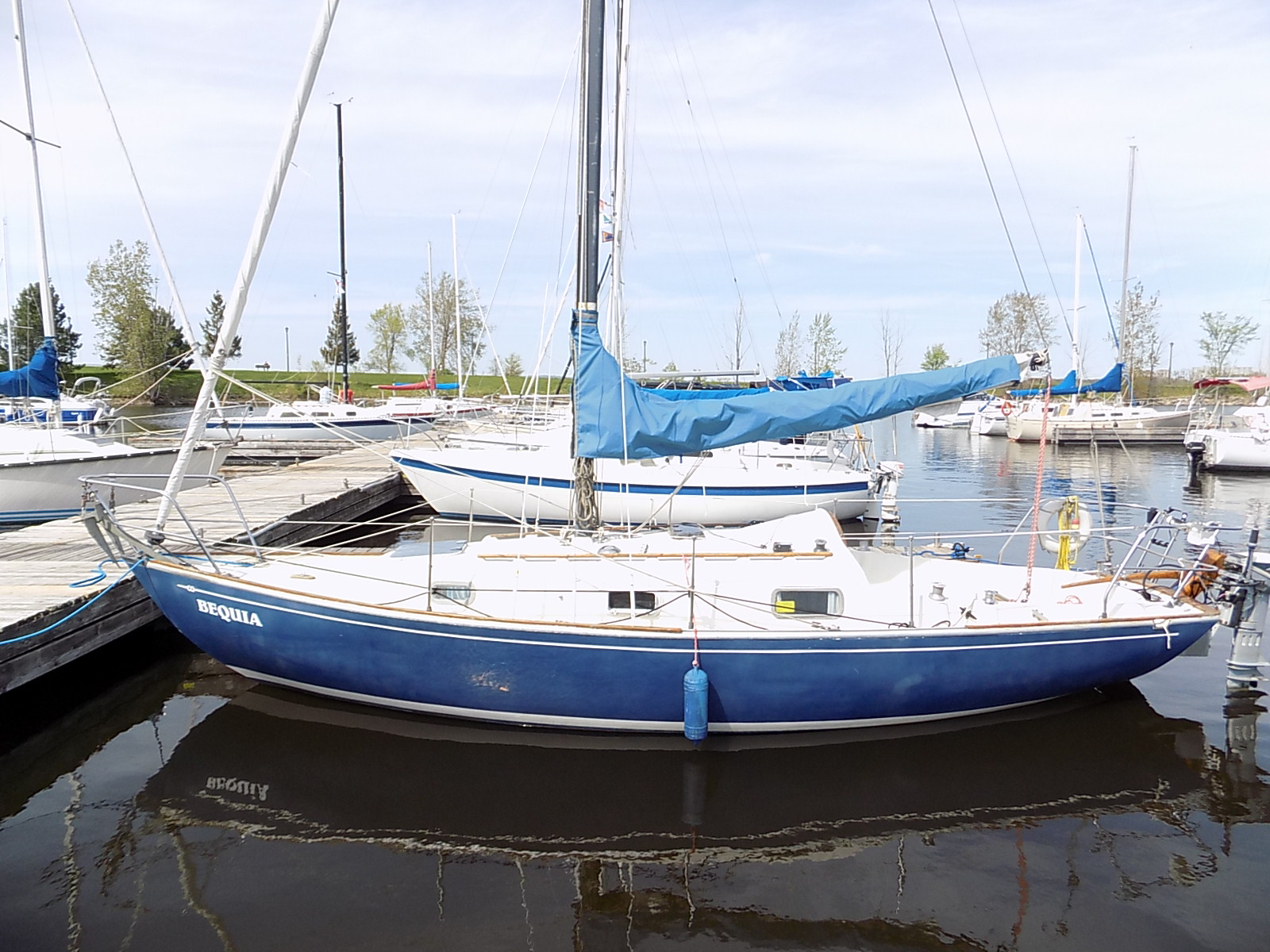
Contessa 26

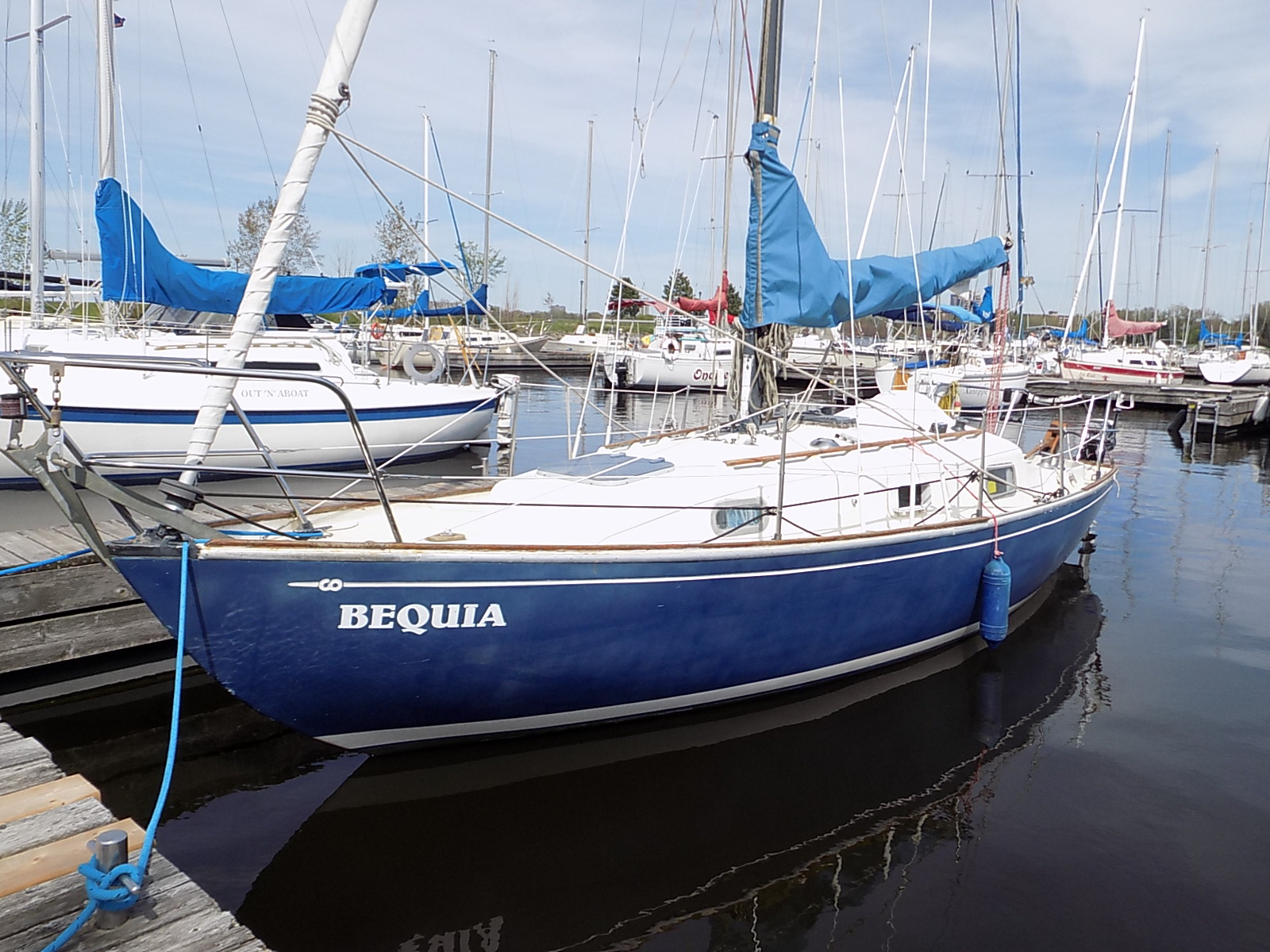
Contessa 26

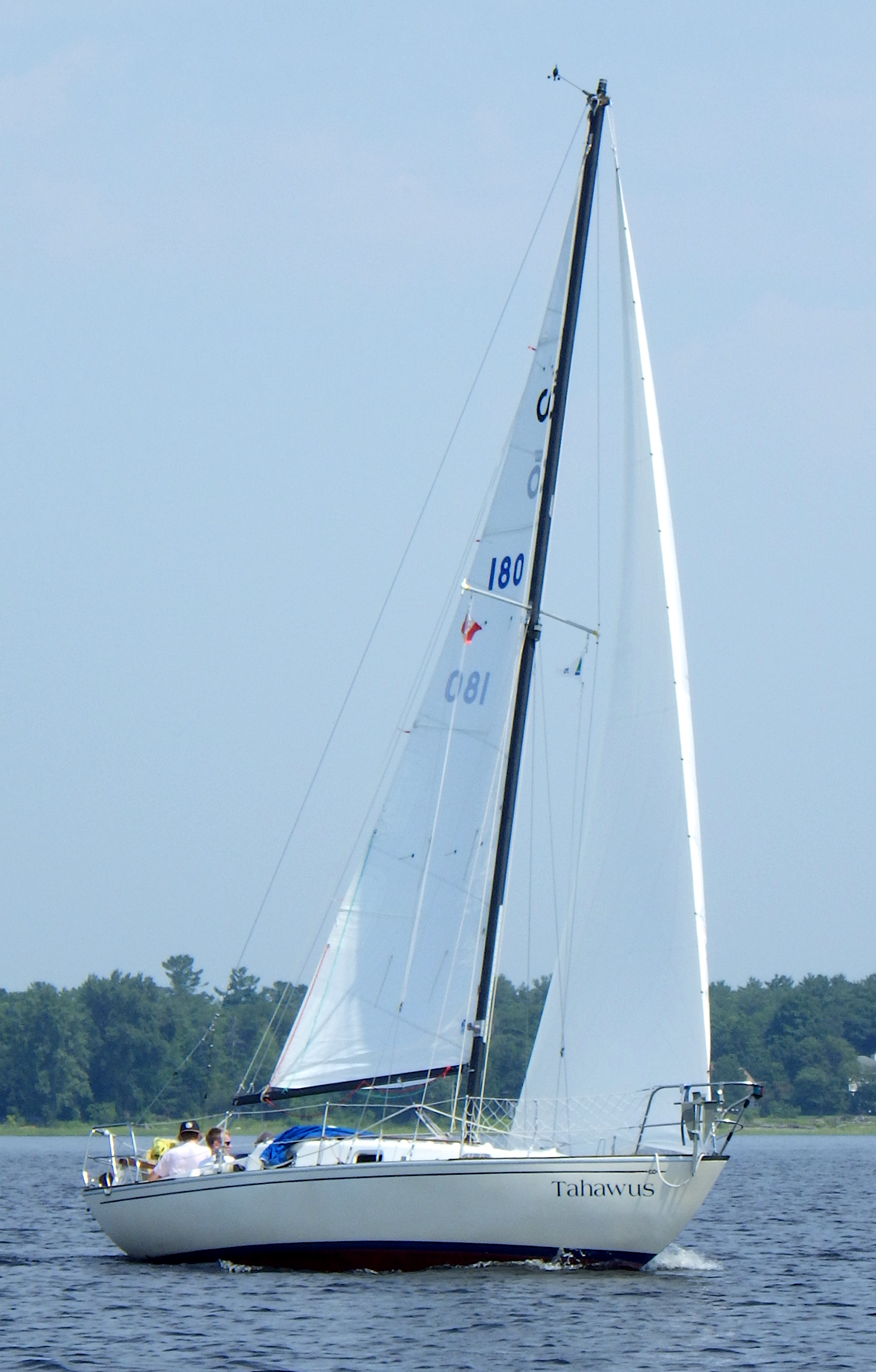
Contessa 26

1970 Round Britain

Mike McMullen with Martin Read as crew took Binkie, the smallest entrant to 15th place overall in the Observer/Daily Express Round Britain Race after 27 days and 15 hours of racing.

1972 Observer Single-handed Trans-Atlantic Race (OSTAR)

Richard Clifford completed in Shamaal, taking 38 days, taking 25th place overall out of 55 starters.

1974 Round Britain

Richard Clifford with David Barrie as crew sailed Shamaal ll to 24th overall, fourth on handicap, out of 61 starters and 39 finishers, after 25 days and 20 hours of racing.

1976 Observer Single-handed Trans-Atlantic Race (OSTAR)

David Sutcliffe sailed Lady Anne of St Donats to a 61st place overall, 43rd in the Jester Class (yachts under 38 feet LOA) in a time of 44 days and 3 hours.

Richard Clifford sailed Shamaal II, to a 30th place overall, 18th in the Jester Class, out of a starting field of 125 of which 73 finished.

== Operational history ==
In a review Michael McGoldrick wrote, "The Contessa 26 ... is clearly robust and overbuilt, and it has to rate as one of the very best ocean-going production boats in its size category. For example, it has no sliding hatch over the main companionway, a feature which makes the cabin roof much stronger and better able to withstand a pounding in an offshore storm. Evidence of this boat's abilities as a bluewater cruiser can be found in the fact that it was chosen by both Tania Aebi and Brian Caldwell in their separate attempts to set the record as the youngest person to complete a single-handed circumnavigation. Because of the nature and origins of this design, the Contessa 26 has a narrow beam and limited elbow room down below."

In a 2010 review Steve Henkel wrote, "best features: Good sea boat, very good tracking ability (good for windvane steering), good pointing ability. She also looks pretty. Worst features: Low coach roof and narrow beam give the cabin a closed-in feeling. There's no space to stand up under a companionway hatch, since there is no hatch; instead, a “bubble” facilitates entry to the cabin. Low freeboard gives a wet ride in rough conditions. Some boats need scuppers relocated."

Peter Hancock tells of his travels in Kylie in Sailing out of Silence, Sailing into Sunshine, and Sailing Home. Several transoceanic voyages have been completed, including two circumnavigations: by Tania Aebi in Varuna, as described in her book Maiden Voyage, and by Brian Caldwell who in 1995 aged 19, began a journey of 27,000 miles (43,000 km) in Mai Miti Vavau to become, at the time, the youngest person to sail around the world alone. These latter two sailed in the J. J. Taylor built Canadian version of the 26.

Australian Nick Jaffe sailed singlehanded in his Jeremy Rogers 1972 Contessa 26 named Constellation, to Sydney, Australia. He set off from Monnikendam, the Netherlands on 17 September 2007 and arrived in Sydney in the early hours on 1 February 2010.

Canadian Stéphane Tremblay, sailed singlehanded and engineless from Sandy Hook, New Jersey to Spain via the Azores and back against the trade wind, aboard his J.J. Taylor Contessa 26 Joshua III on 15 May 2008.
