= Southampton Boat Show =

Boat show

Coordinates: 50°53′52.05″N 1°24′31.46″W

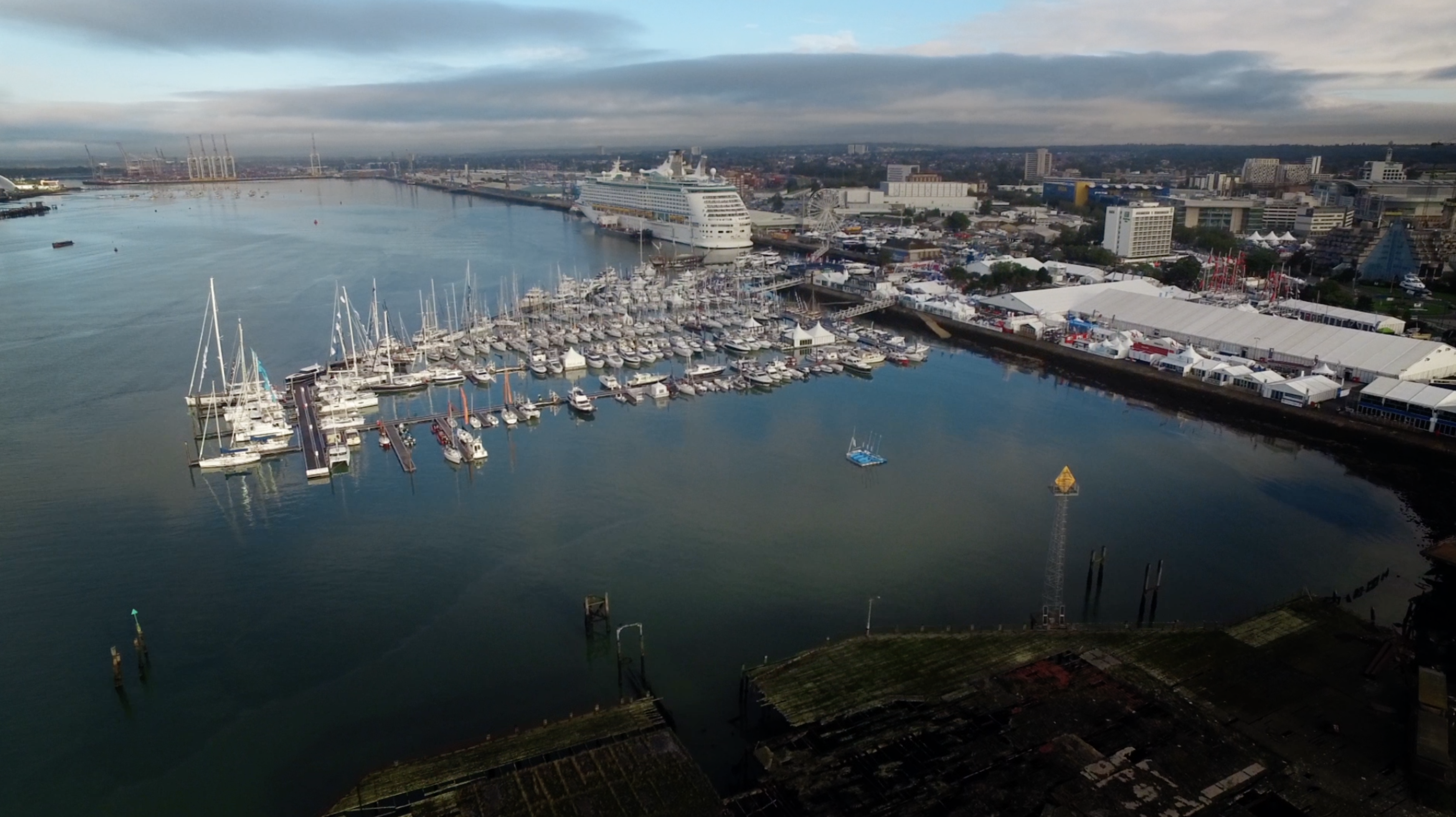
Aerial shot of the Southampton Boat Show 2015

The Southampton Boat Show, also called the Southampton International Boat Show, is an on-water boat show, one of the largest in Europe and the biggest of its type in the UK. The show is held annually in September in Mayflower Park, Southampton, England. The Southampton Boat Show is run by British Marine, the trade association for the leisure, superyacht and small commercial marine industry. The 2025 event will take place from 19 to 28 September.

The Southampton Boat Show is an important sales platform for both national and international businesses, attracting over 110,000 visitors. The show attracts high net worth individuals from the UK and around the world, with an attendance sex ratio of 77% male, 23% female and an average age of 51 years. The average amount spent at each show is over £880 per head (excluding spending on boats).

== History ==
The show began in 1969. In its first year it had a single pontoon for the display of boats on loan from the army. Since September 1997, the Boat Show has been a ten-day event, after the passing in July of the Southampton International Boat Show Act 1997 that allows Mayflower Park to close for 10 days instead of 9. Past events have attracted a large number of visitors, with more than 123,000 attending the 2004 event. The 2005 event featured a makeshift beach, with tonnes of sand being imported to the event.

== Recent Editions ==
=== 2025 ===
The 56th Southampton International Boat Show took place from 19 to 28 September 2025 at Mayflower Park, Southampton. This edition featured a reimagined layout, including a new entrance on Mayflower Park, and introduced new thematic zones such as the Powerhub and the Wooden Boat Stage. The show also expanded its on-water entertainment with performances from Jack Moule, Team Endeavour Racing, and JETSURF. Oyster Yachts showcased the Oyster 595 on berth M639 during the event.

=== 2023 ===
The 54th Southampton International Boat Show was held from 15 to 24 September 2023 at Mayflower Park. The event attracted over 92,000 visitors despite changeable weather conditions. It featured more than 600 exhibitors and over 300 boats displayed in what is claimed to be Europe's largest purpose-built show marina.

=== 2024 ===
The 55th edition took place from 13 to 22 September 2024. With a reported attendance of over 100,300 visitors, it was one of the most successful editions of the show. More than 650 craft were showcased, including 350 boats afloat in the marina. The event featured 87 world and UK product debuts.

Notable attendees included HRH The Princess Royal, who toured the exhibition and met with exhibitors. Television personalities Captain Glenn Shephard and Daisy Kelliher from Below Deck Sailing Yacht also made guest appearances at the show.

The 2024 show introduced a revised marina layout designed to group similar yacht styles together, enhancing the visitor experience by enabling easier direct comparison between vessels. New zones included the Watersports Zone, Dinghy Zone, Classic & Day Boat Zone, and "The Shipyard", a new entertainment area offering live music, food and drink, and informal talks from marine experts.

=== Sustainability ===
British Marine, the organiser of the show, implemented several environmental initiatives in 2024. These included the use of recyclable stand materials, reuse of event signage, and a mandatory Environmental Pledge for exhibitors. The show also hosted the sixth annual Exhibitor Sustainability Awards, recognising efforts to improve environmental responsibility across the event.

Sunsail and The Moorings were joint winners of the British Marine Sustainability Award 2024 for their commitment to sustainable tourism and operations.

=== Southampton International Boat Show Act 1997 ===
Southampton International Boat Show Act 1997
- Act of Parliament
- Parliament of the United Kingdom
- Long title: An Act to amend section 60 of the Hampshire Act 1983 to permit closure of Mayflower Park in Southampton or the restriction of public access to it for 10 rather than 9 consecutive days each year for the purposes of the Southampton International Boat Show; and for connected purposes.
- Citation: 1997 c. i

Dates
- Royal assent: 15 July 1997
- Commencement: 15 July 1997

Status: Current legislation

Text of statute as originally enacted

The Southampton International Boat Show Act 1997 (c. i) is an act of the Parliament of the United Kingdom. It is a local act. Section 1 provides the short title. Section 2 amends section 60 of the Hampshire Act 1983. The effect of the amendment made by section 2(2) is to allow Mayflower Park to close for 10 days instead of 9 during the Southampton International Boat Show.

By 2008, the act had not received any amendment of a kind listed in the Chronological Tables.

The bill for this act was the Southampton International Boat Show Bill.

== Exhibitors ==
The exhibitors at the Boat Show cover every aspect of the leisure marine industry from boat builders, sail makers, chandlers and engine manufacturers to marine finance, clothing specialists, navigation equipment. There are thousands of boats, brands, products and suppliers for the ten day Show.

== Organisers ==
British Marine is the trade association for the UK boating industry. Run by the industry, for the industry, the profits from both Shows are reinvested back into the UK leisure marine industry through the services and representation provided by British Marine. British Marine has over 1,600 members, which account for a substantial amount of the industry's turnover and employ around 30,000 people. They are drawn from both the seagoing and inland sectors of the marine industry covering the leisure boat, hire fleet, commercial work boat and superyacht categories and supporting services.
