= British Marine =

United Kingdom trade association

British Marine logo

British Marine is the trade association for the UK leisure, superyacht and small commercial marine industry, currently representing 12 regional associations, 16 Group Associations and 1600+ members across the UK marine supply chain. These include the Superyacht sector, chandlers, boatbuilders, brokers, suppliers of equipment for yachts and motorboats, to flag makers, Sailing Training and operators of marinas both coastal and inland. British Marine also promotes career opportunities in the marine industry and advice and assistance through their Environment and Boating Facilities, and Training and Technical teams.

== History ==
The Boat, Yacht and Allied Trades Association was formed in 1913 with the aims of promoting and protecting its members, promoting or opposing government legislation and helping companies in monetary and legal matters. By 1919, the Association had 108 Full and 74 Associate members and a full-time secretary. In 1947 the Association became the Ship and Boat Builders National Federation. In 1973, the Federation joined forces with the Royal Yachting Association and lobbied MP's to oppose a Labour Government imposed 25% VAT on boats. After an audience with then Chancellor Denis Healey, the following year the rate was halved and eventually returned to the standard rate.

In 1986 the Federation became the British Marine Industries Federation, in 2008 it was renamed the British Marine Federation and finally, in 2015, it was rebranded as British Marine.

== Boat Shows ==
Starting in 1914, a joint exhibition took place at Olympia, London with the Society of Motor Manufacturers and Traders (SMMT) but in 1954, an independent London Boat Show was held at the Empire Hall, Olympia. This moved to the Earls Court Exhibition Centre in 1957 and finally to its current location, ExCeL, in 2004. National Boat Shows, rebranded British Marine Boat Shows in 2015 and then British Marine in 2017, was set up to run the organisation's Boat Shows, and made a successful acquisition of the Southampton Boat Show.

The cancellation of London Boat Show from 2019 was announced in May 2018, with organisers citing the show as commercially unviable for the industry in its current format.

The Southampton Boat Show is currently a ten-day event held annually in September in Mayflower Park, Southampton, England.

== Training Programmes ==
British Marine promotes a variety of training programmes in U.K. Some of them are:

- Marina Managers Course
- Short Courses
