= Outrigger boat =

Boat with one or more lateral support floats

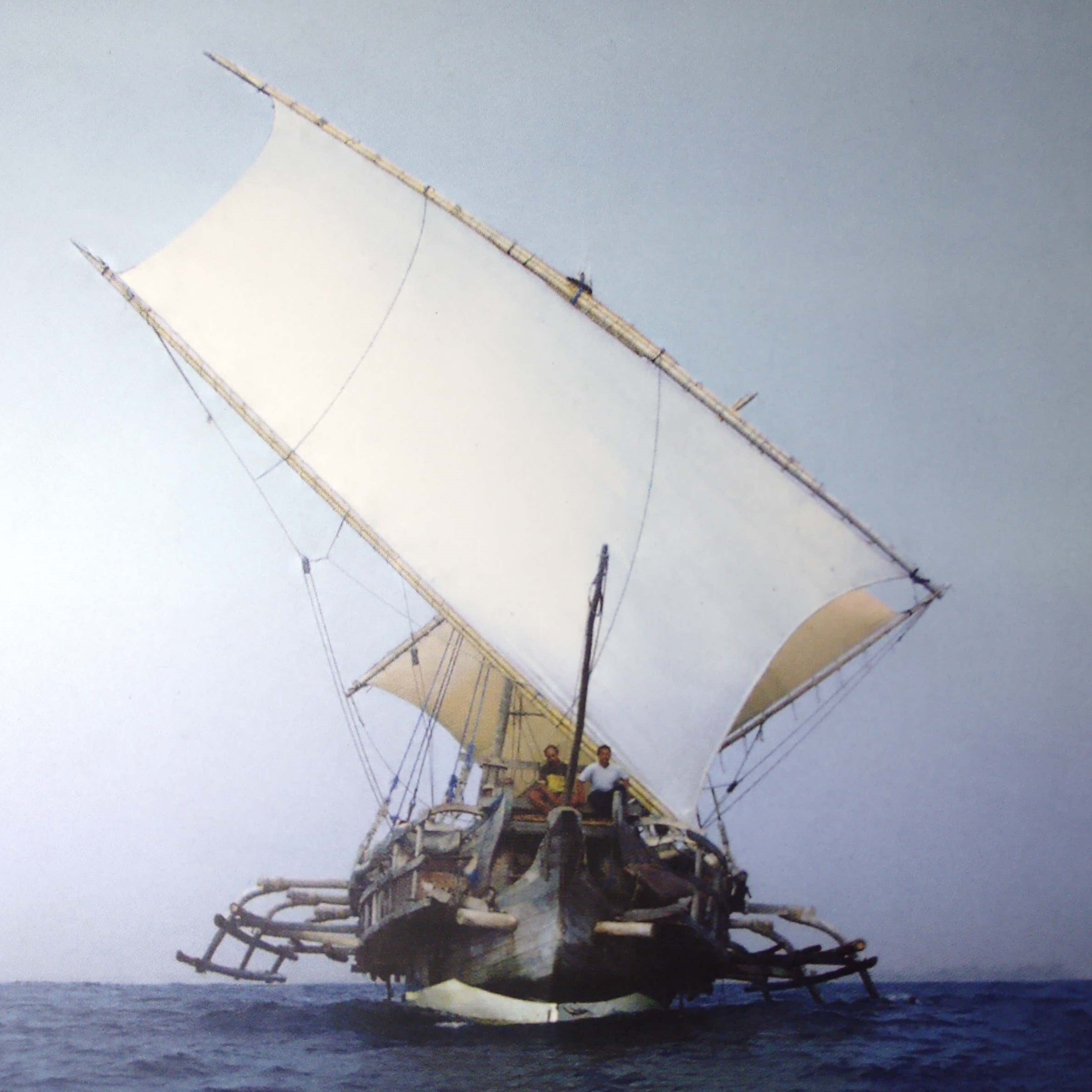
Samudra Raksa ship, a replica of Javanese 8th century double outrigger vessel depicted in Borobudur bas relief. From 2003 to 2004 it sailed from Indonesia to Madagascar and to Ghana.

Outrigger boats are various watercraft featuring one or more lateral support floats known as outriggers, which are fastened to one or both sides of the main hull. They can range from small dugout canoes to large plank-built vessels. Outrigger boats can also vary in their configuration, from the ancestral double-hull configuration (catamarans), to single-outrigger vessels prevalent in the Pacific Islands and Madagascar, to the double-outrigger vessels (trimarans) prevalent in Island Southeast Asia. They are traditionally fitted with Austronesian sails, like the crab claw sails and tanja sails, but in modern times are often fitted with petrol engines.

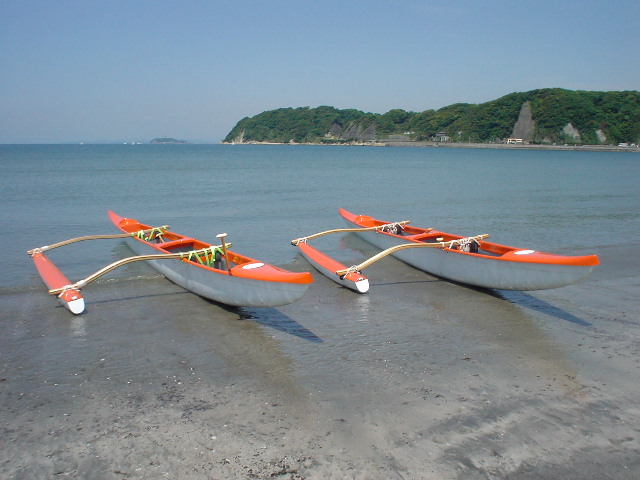
Single-outrigger canoes from Polynesia

Unlike a single-hulled vessel, an outrigger or double-hull vessel generates stability as a result of the distance between its hulls rather than due to the shape of each individual hull. As such, the hulls of outrigger or double-hull boats are typically longer, narrower and more hydrodynamically efficient than those of single-hull vessels. Compared to other types of canoes, smaller outrigger canoes can be quite fast, yet are also capable of being paddled and sailed in rougher water. This paddling technique, however, differs greatly from kayaking or rowing. The paddle, or blade, used by the paddler is single sided, with either a straight or a double-bend shaft.

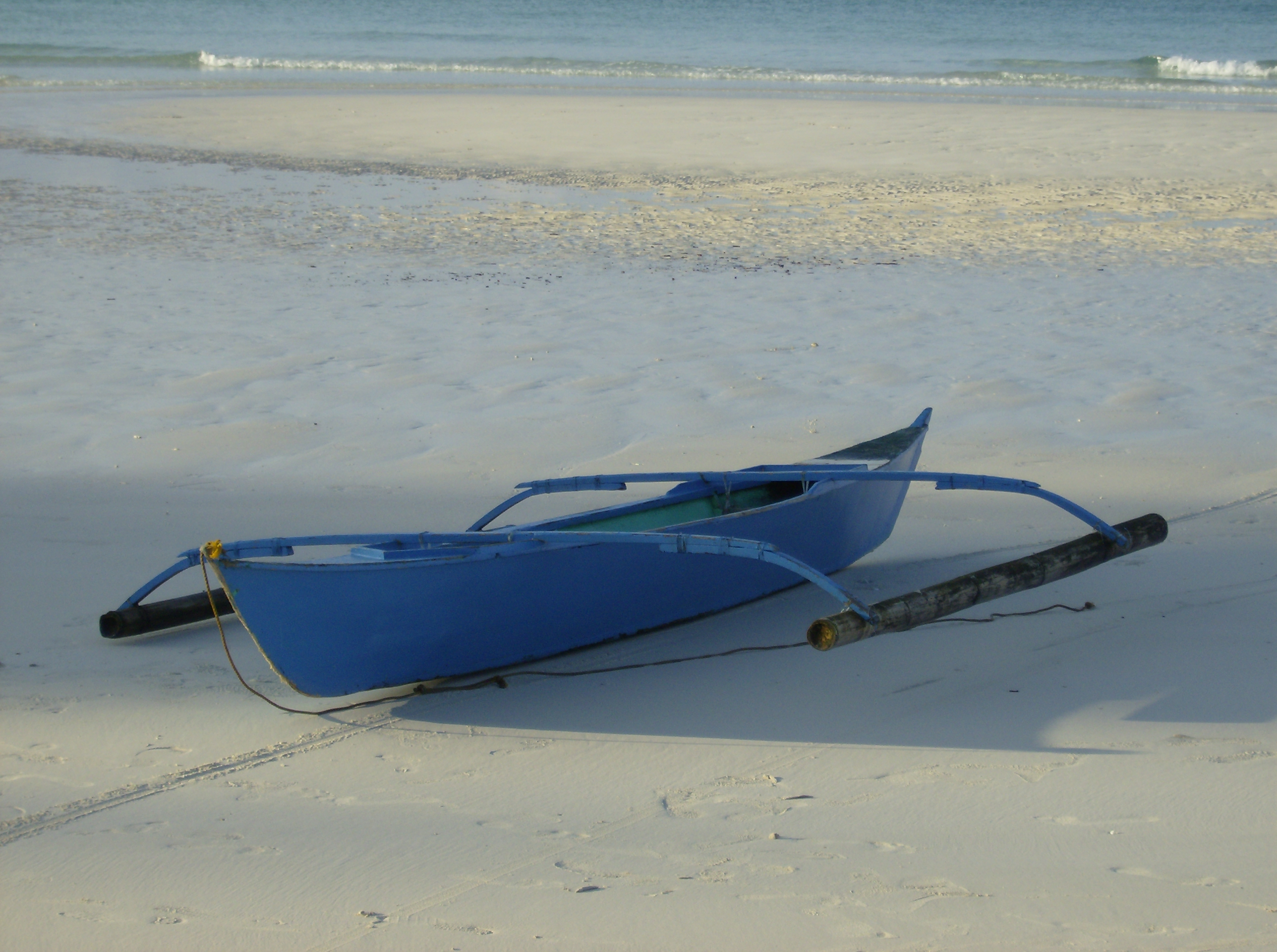
A double-outrigger canoe from the Philippines

These vessels were the first true ocean-going ships, and are an important part of the Austronesian heritage. They were the vessels that enabled the Austronesian expansion from Taiwan into the islands of both the Indian and Pacific Ocean from around 3000 BC. They comprise the bulk of traditional boats in Island Southeast Asia, Island Melanesia, Micronesia, Polynesia, and Madagascar. They have spread to other cultures Austronesians came into contact with, notably in Sri Lanka and southern India as well as in the coast of East Africa. In modern times, outrigger vessels are used in the sport of sailing. Catamaran and trimaran configurations are also widely used for high speed craft.

== History ==
Map showing the migration and expansion of the Austronesians

Outrigger boats were originally developed by the Austronesian-speaking peoples of the islands of Southeast Asia for sea travel. It is believed that the use of outriggers may have been initially caused by the need for stability on small watercraft after the invention of crab claw sails some time around 1500 BCE.

Outrigger boats were essential in the transportation of Austronesians both eastward to Polynesia and New Zealand and westward across the Indian Ocean as far as Madagascar during the Austronesian migration period. The Austronesian peoples (Malagasy, Maritime Southeast Asian, Micronesian, Melanesian, Taiwanese indigenous peoples, and Polynesian peoples) continue to be the primary users of the outrigger boats.

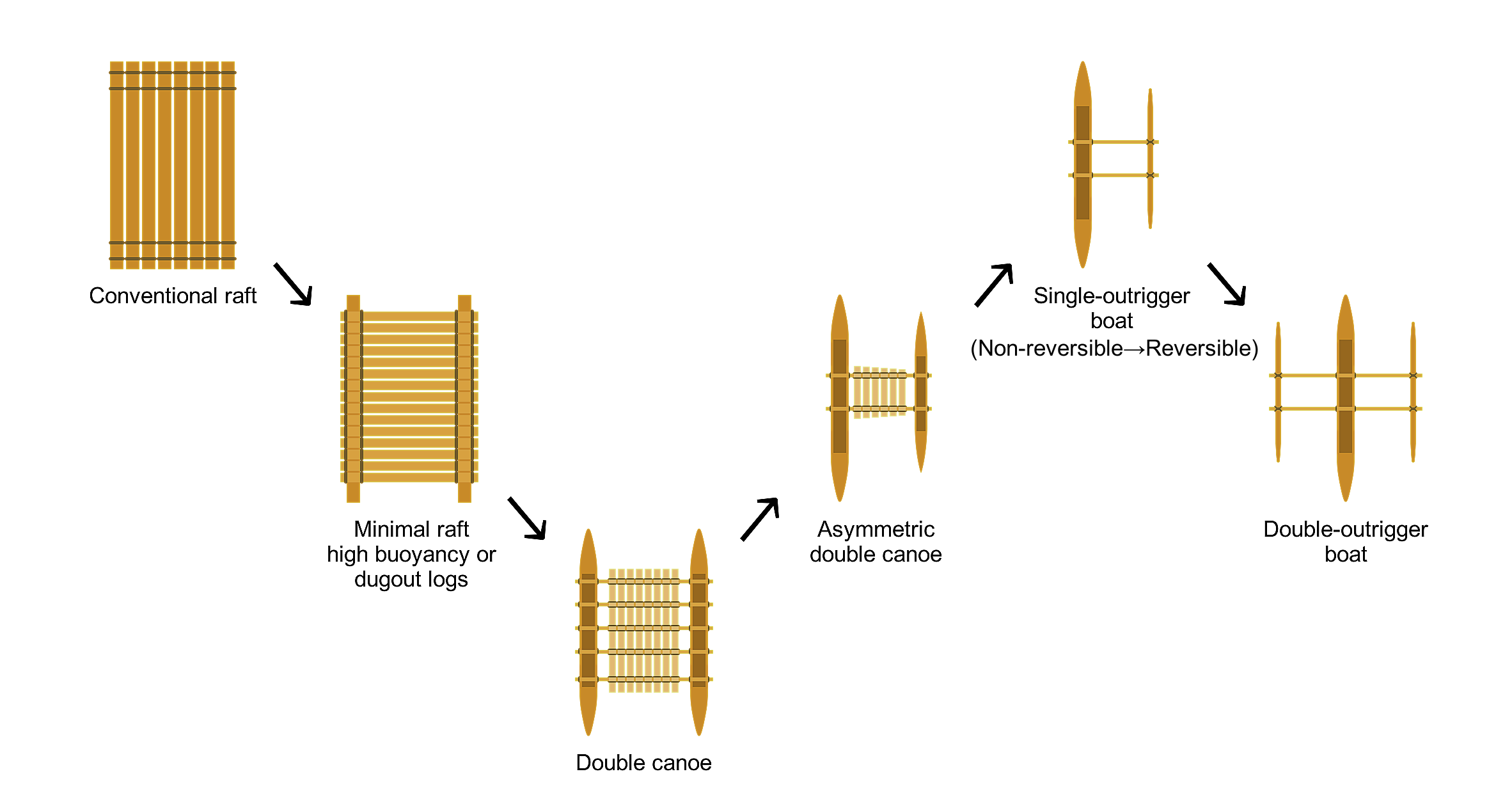
Succession of forms in the development of the Austronesian boat (Mahdi, 1999)

The simplest form of all ancestral Austronesian boats had five parts. The bottom part consists of single piece of hollowed-out log. At the sides were two planks, and two horseshoe-shaped wood pieces formed the prow and stern. These were "sewn" together with dowels and lashings. They had no central rudders but were instead steered using an oar on one side. The ancestral rig was the mastless triangular crab claw sail which had two booms that could be tilted to the wind. These were built in the double-canoe configuration or had a single outrigger on the windward side. In Island Southeast Asia, these developed into double outriggers on each side that provided greater stability. The triangular crab claw sails also later developed into square or rectangular tanja sails, which like crab claw sails, had booms spanning the upper and lower edges. Fixed masts also developed later in both Southeast Asia (usually as bipod or tripod masts) and Oceania.

Early researchers like Heine-Geldern (1932) and Hornell (1943) once believed that catamarans evolved from outrigger boats, but modern authors specializing in Austronesian cultures like Doran (1981) and Mahdi (1988) now believe it to be the opposite.

Two canoes bound together developed directly from minimal raft technologies of two logs tied together. Over time, the double-hulled canoe form developed into the asymmetric double canoe, where one hull is smaller than the other. Eventually the smaller hull became the prototype outrigger, giving way to the single outrigger canoe, which diverged into the reversible single outrigger canoe in Oceania. Finally, the single outrigger types developed into the double outrigger canoe (or trimarans).

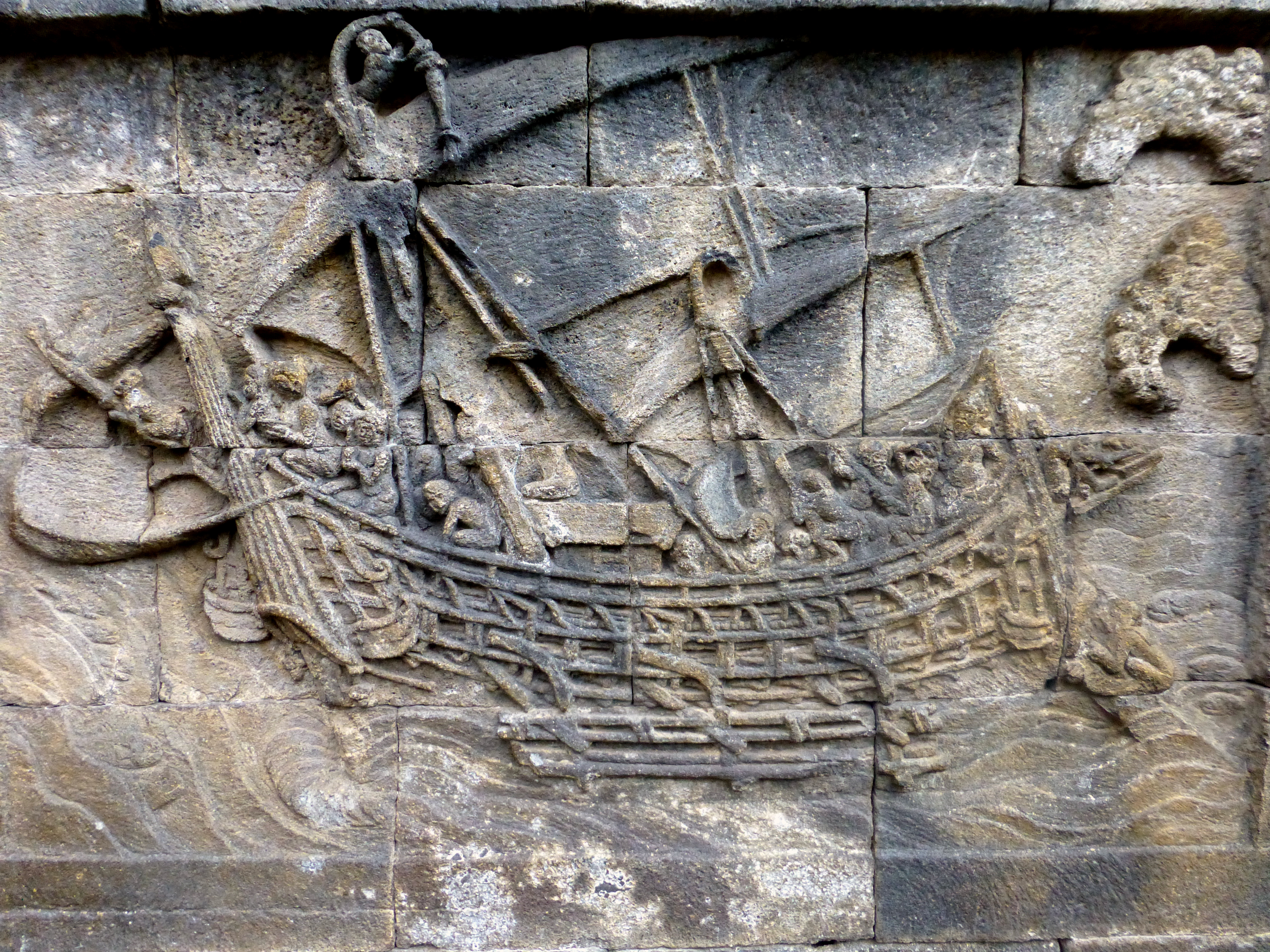
A bas relief of Borobudur ship, a double outrigger vessel depicted in 8th century Borobudur temple, Java, Indonesia.

This would also explain why older Austronesian populations in Island Southeast Asia tend to favor double outrigger boats, as it keeps the boats stable when tacking. But they still have small regions where catamarans and single-outrigger boats are still used. In contrast, more distant outlying descendant populations in Micronesia, Polynesia, Madagascar, and the Comoros retained the double-hull and the single outrigger boat types, for the technology of double outriggers never reached them (exceptions being western Melanesia). To deal with the problem of the instability of the boat when the outrigger faces leeward when tacking, they instead developed the shunting technique in sailing, in conjunction with reversible single-outriggers.

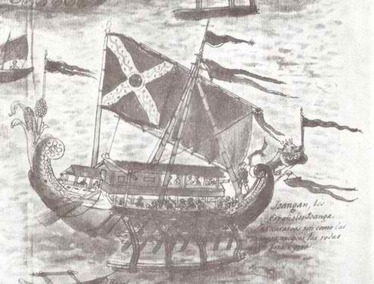
17th-century depiction of a Spanish-owned karakoa, a very large Visayan double-outrigger warship

When Magellan's ships first encountered the Chamorros of the Mariana Islands in 1521, Antonio Pigafetta recorded that the Chamorros' sailboats far surpassed Magellan's in speed and maneuverability. Similarly, the Spanish priest Francisco Combés, describing the large karakoa outrigger warships of the Visayan Islands in the Philippines, remarked:

"That care and attention, which govern their boat-building, cause their ships to sail like birds, while ours are like lead in this regard."

— Francisco Combés, Historia de las islas de Mindanao, Iolo y sus adyacentes (1667)

Outrigger fishing canoes are also used among certain non-Austronesian groups, such as the Sinhalese in Sri Lanka, where they are known as oruwa, as well as among some groups in the Andaman and Nicobar Islands. They can also be found in East Africa (e.g., the ungalawa of Tanzania).

The acquisition of the catamaran and outrigger boat technology by the non-Austronesian peoples in Sri Lanka and southern India is the result of very early Austronesian contact with the region, including the Maldives and Laccadive Islands. This is estimated to have occurred around 1000 to 600 BCE and onwards. This may have possibly included limited colonization that have since been assimilated. This is still evident in Sri Lankan and South Indian languages. For example, Tamil paṭavu, Telugu paḍava, and Kannada paḍahu, all meaning "ship", are all derived from Proto-Hesperonesian *padaw, "sailboat", with Austronesian cognates like Javanese perahu, Kadazan padau, Maranao padaw, Cebuano paráw, Samoan folau, Hawaiian halau, and Māori wharau.

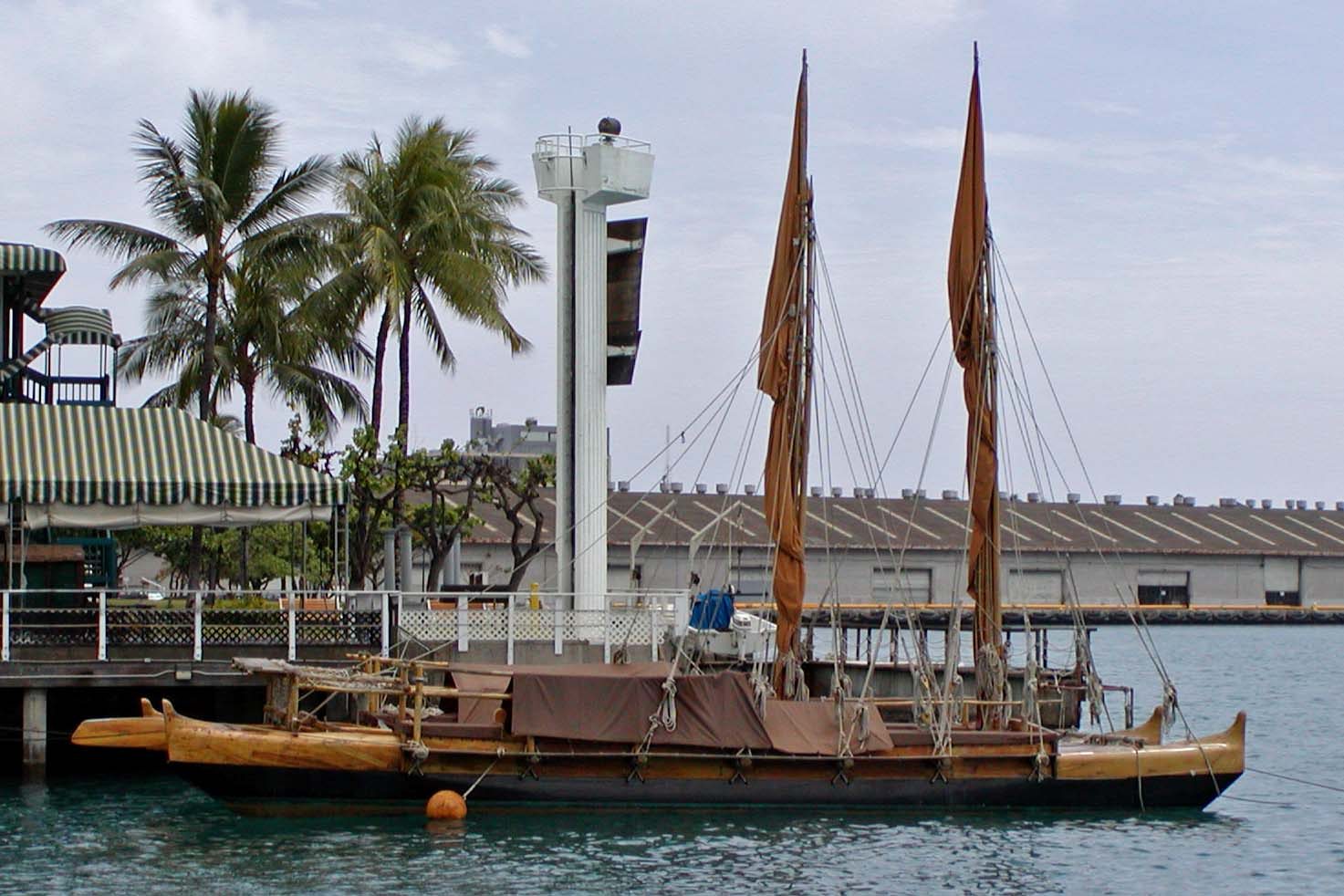
Hawaiiloa, a double-hull (catamaran) sailing canoe built as a replica of Polynesian voyaging canoes

The technology has persisted into the modern age. Outrigger boats can be quite large fishing or transport vessels. In the Philippines, outrigger boats (called bangka or paraw) are often fitted with petrol engines. The links between seafaring and outrigger boats in the Philippines extend through to political life, in which the smallest political unit in the country is still called "barangay" after the historical balangay outrigger boats used in the original migrations of the first Austronesian peoples across the archipelago and beyond. The Polynesian Voyaging Society has two double-hull sailing catamarans, Hokulea and Hawaiiloa, and sails them between various islands in the Pacific using traditional Polynesian navigation methods without instruments. The Hikianalia and Alingano Maisu are other extant double-hulled voyaging canoes.

== Terminology and linguistics ==
The German linguist Otto Dempwolff (1871-1938) originally reconstructed the Proto-Austronesian word for "boat" as *waŋkaŋ, and included the reflexes for both *baŋkaʔ and *waŋkaʔ as its descendants. However modern linguists like Robert Blust generally reject this. Mahdi (2016) instead reconstructs four words for "boat" in the Austronesian languages, all ultimately derived from the monosyllabic protoforms *Cu and *baŋ. They are:

a) *qaCu - cognates include Squliq-Atayal qasuʔ, Pazeh ʔasuʔ, and Bunun hatoʔ
b) *qabaŋ - cognates include Kanakanavu abaŋɯ, Oponohu-Rukai havaŋu, Siraya avang, Gaddang ʔabaŋ, Tiruray ʔawaŋ, Iranun awaŋ, Mentawai abak, and Moken kabaŋ
c) *baŋkaʔ - cognates include Kavalan baŋka, Tagalog baŋkaʔ, Tausug baŋkaʔ, Mori and Muna baŋka, and Sumbawa baŋka
d) *waŋkaʔ' - cognates include Manggarai and Rembong waŋka, Tobati wăgě, Yabem waŋ, Suau waga, Hiw wakə, Mota aka, Fijian waqa, Tongan vaka, Māori waka and Hawaiian waʻa; Tahitian and Samoan vaʻa

Instead of being cognates, the protoforms *baŋkaʔ and *waŋkaʔ are believed to be doublets. The protoforms *qabaŋ and *baŋkaʔ are composites with a common precursor, with the *qa- and -*ka positioned differently. Only *qaCu and *qabaŋ can be traced back to Proto-Austronesian, with the rest being later developments.

The outrigger float is called the ama in many Polynesian languages (compare Hawaiian ama, Māori ama, and Samoan ama, all meaning 'outrigger float'), realisations of Proto-Malayo-Polynesian *saRman 'outrigger float'. Similar terms also exist in other Malayo-Polynesian languages, such as Pohnpeian dahm, Yapese thaam, Ambonese Malay semang, all meaning 'outrigger float', as well as Chamorro sakman meaning '[a] large canoe.' The outrigger boom—spars connecting the ama to the main hull (or the two hulls in a double-hull canoe)—are called ʻiako in Hawaiian and kiato in Māori (with similar words in other Polynesian languages), ultimately from Proto-Oceanic *kiajo or its doublet *kayajo both meaning 'outrigger boom' (compare Loniu kiec, Kiribati kiaro, and Tongan kiato, as well as Seimat ayas and Gedaged ayad, all meaning 'outrigger boom'). In Philippine languages, the outrigger floats are called katig or kate, from Proto-Philippine *katiR.

== Types ==
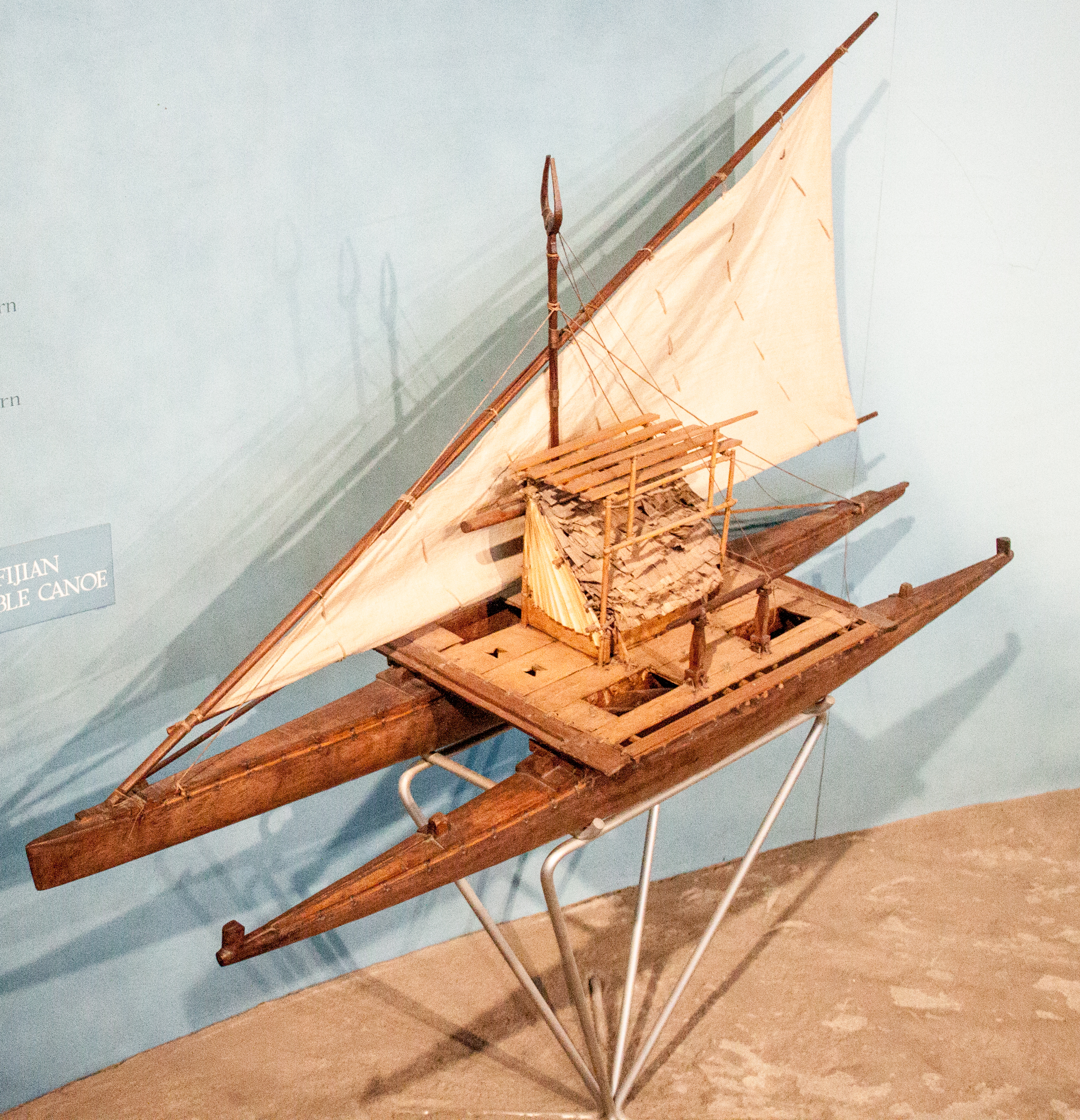
Model of a Fijian drua, an example of a double-hull proa

Double-outrigger boats are more prevalent in Southeast Asia, though single-outriggers and catamarans also exist. They have two outrigger floats connected to spars lashed across a single hull. They range in size from small vessels like the jukung, vinta, and the paraw; to medium-sized trading and fishing vessels like the balangay and basnigan; to very large warships like the karakoa and kora kora. In Philippine vessels, additional booms called batangan are usually added across the outrigger spars (tadik), in between the outrigger floats (katig) and the main hull (bangka). In modern terminology, especially in leisure or sport boating, double-outrigger ships are usually termed trimaran or triple-hull ships.

An unusual type of double-outrigger boat design, preserved in scale models in the Pitt Rivers Museum, forms a triangle shape. The front ends of the outriggers are attached directly to the hull, while the rear ends are splayed out. These boats were small and used exclusively as passenger ferries in the Pasig River of the Philippines.

Catamarans and single-outrigger canoes are the traditional configurations in Polynesia, Micronesia, and Madagascar. In the Pacific Islands, a single outrigger float is called an ama. It is connected to the main hull by spars called ʻiako (Hawaiian), ʻiato (Tahitian), or kiato (Māori). The ama, which is usually rigged on the left side, provides stability. The paddlers need to be careful to avoid leaning too far on the opposite side of the ama, as that may cause the canoe to capsize (huli or lumaʻi). Double-outrigger configurations, a later innovation from Southeast Asian Austronesians, never reached Oceania.

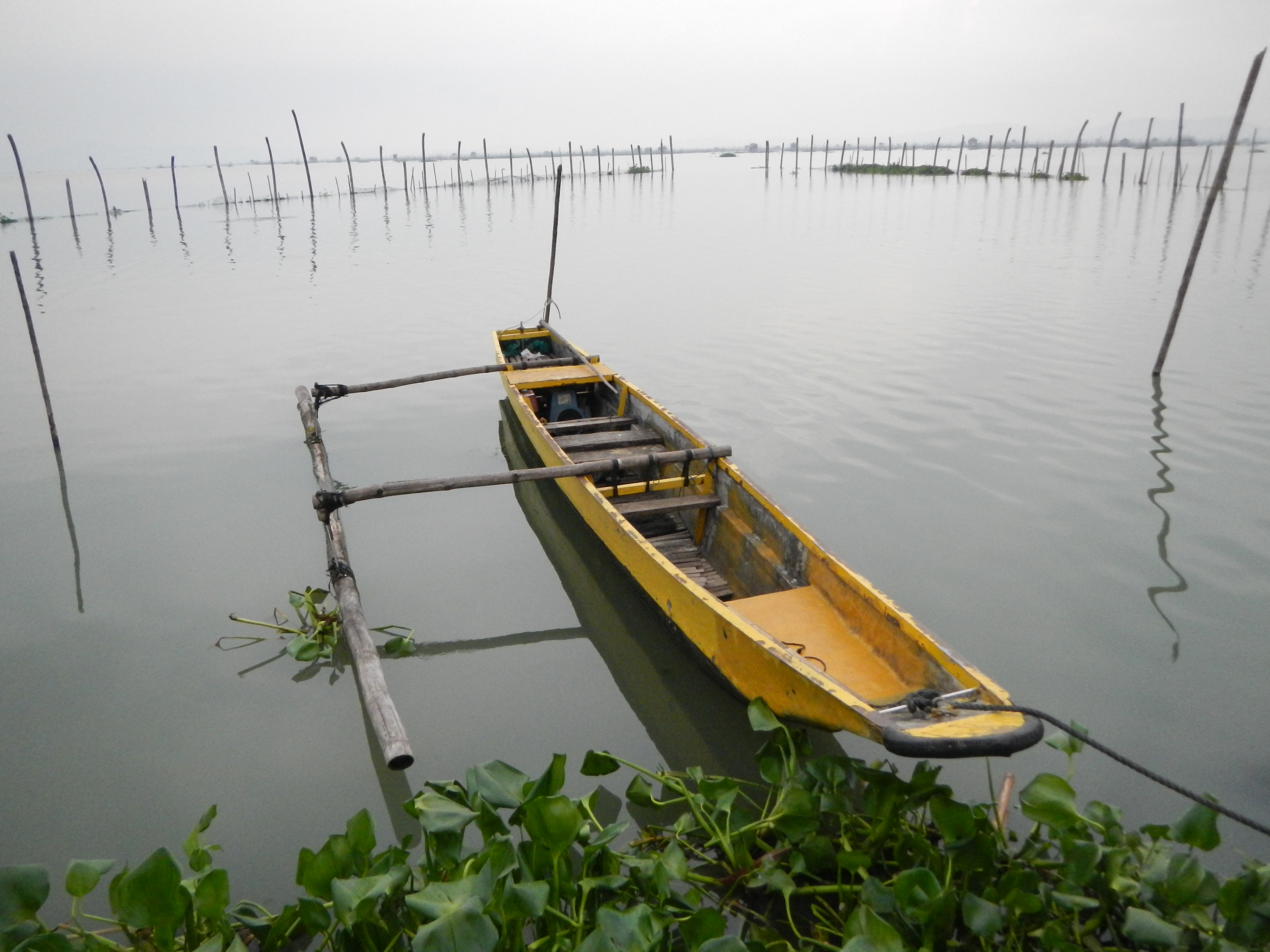
A single-outrigger motorized armadahan from Laguna de Bay, Philippines

Single-outrigger dugout canoes also exist in the Philippines. Examples include canoes from Laguna de Bay, as well as boats from Lake Bulusan and Lake Buhi of the Bicol Region. A notable example is the armadahan of Laguna de Bay, which were dugouts typically 10 to 12 m (33 to 39 ft) long and 1 to 1.3 m (3.3 to 4.3 ft) wide. They were equipped with two masts. The single outrigger float (palangoy) on the starboard side was either two bamboo poles lashed together or a flattened elongated beam. It also featured a counter-balance beam projecting off the port side known as the paltek. In modern times, these types of boats are usually motorized or paddled. And the single outrigger is used to provide lateral stability, while still allowing fishermen to work with fishing nets. They were more widespread in the Philippines in the past, with a specimen in the University of Southampton from Manila Bay collected in the 1940s for example. But they have largely disappeared in modern times, partly due to the scarcity of suitable timber and partly due to the relative cheapness of fiberglass boats.

== List of traditional outrigger vessels by region ==
The following is an incomplete list of traditional Austronesian outrigger vessels. It also includes catamarans.

=== Island Southeast Asia ===
==== Indonesia ====
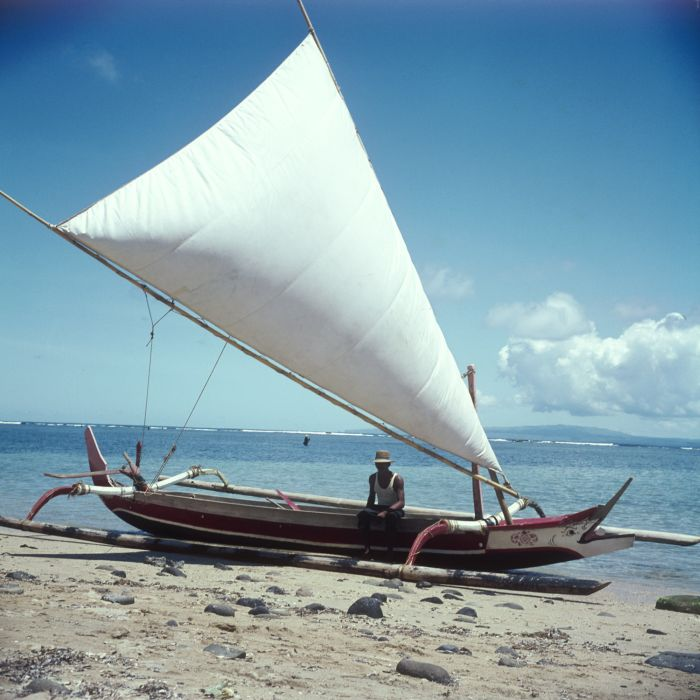
A jukung from Indonesia

- Borobudur ship
- Jellore
- Jukung
- Knabat bogolu
- Kora kora
- Londe
- Paduwang
- Paledang
- Pangajava
- Pangkur
- Pelang
- Perahu
- Sandeq

==== Malaysia ====
- Penjajap
- Pelang
- Perahu

==== Philippines ====
The double-outrigger paraw in Boracay, Philippines

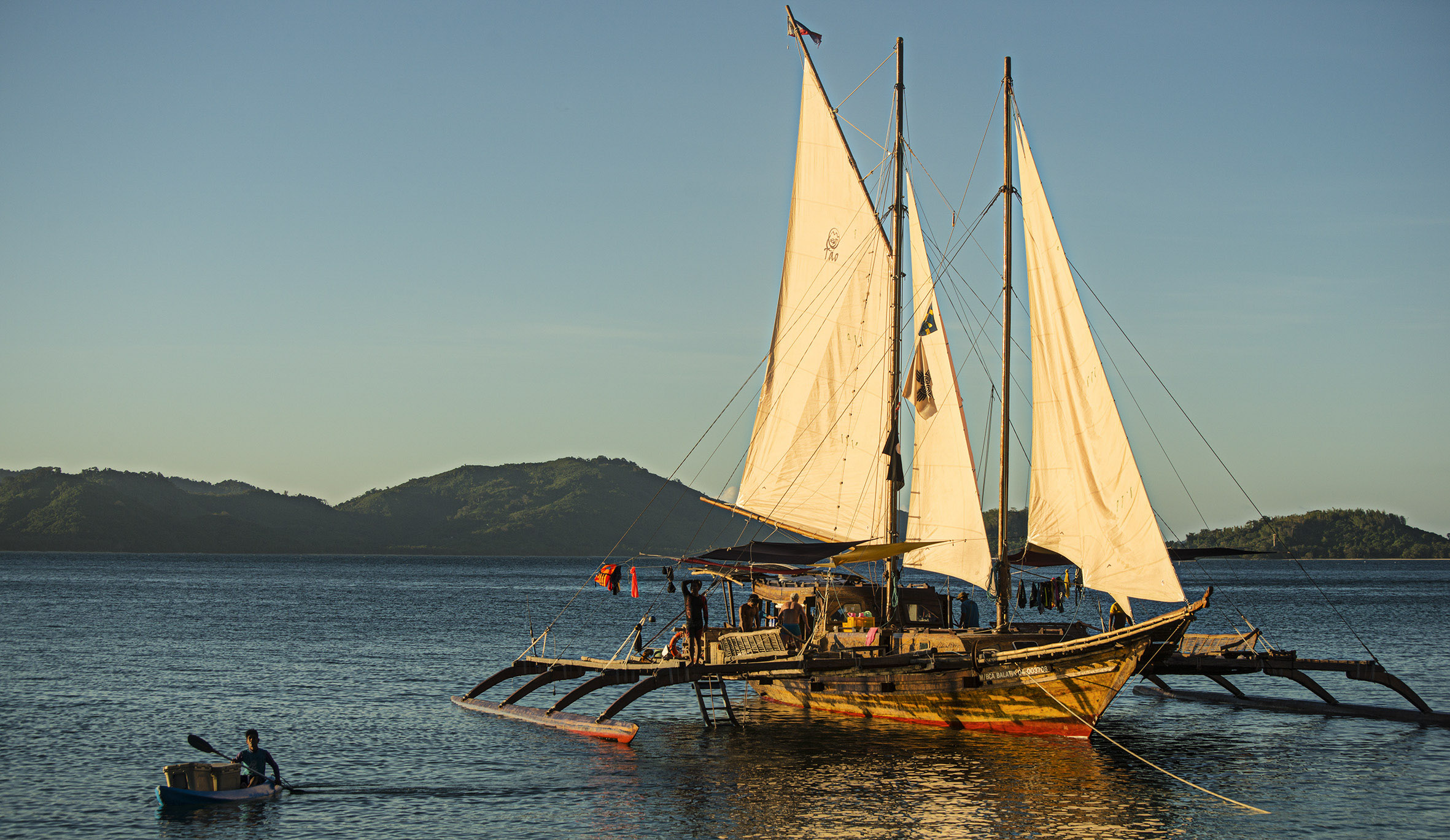
Large double-outrigger paraw in Palawan, Philippines

- Armadahan
- Balación
- Balangay (Baloto, Biray, Biroko)
- Bangka (Sakayan)
- Bangka anak-anak
- Basnigan
- Bigiw
- Casco
- Djenging (Balutu, Kubu)
- Guilalo
- Junkun
- Karakoa
- Lanong
- Pangayaw
- Paraw
- Salisipan
- Tataya
- Vinta (Dapang, Pilang)

=== Melanesia ===
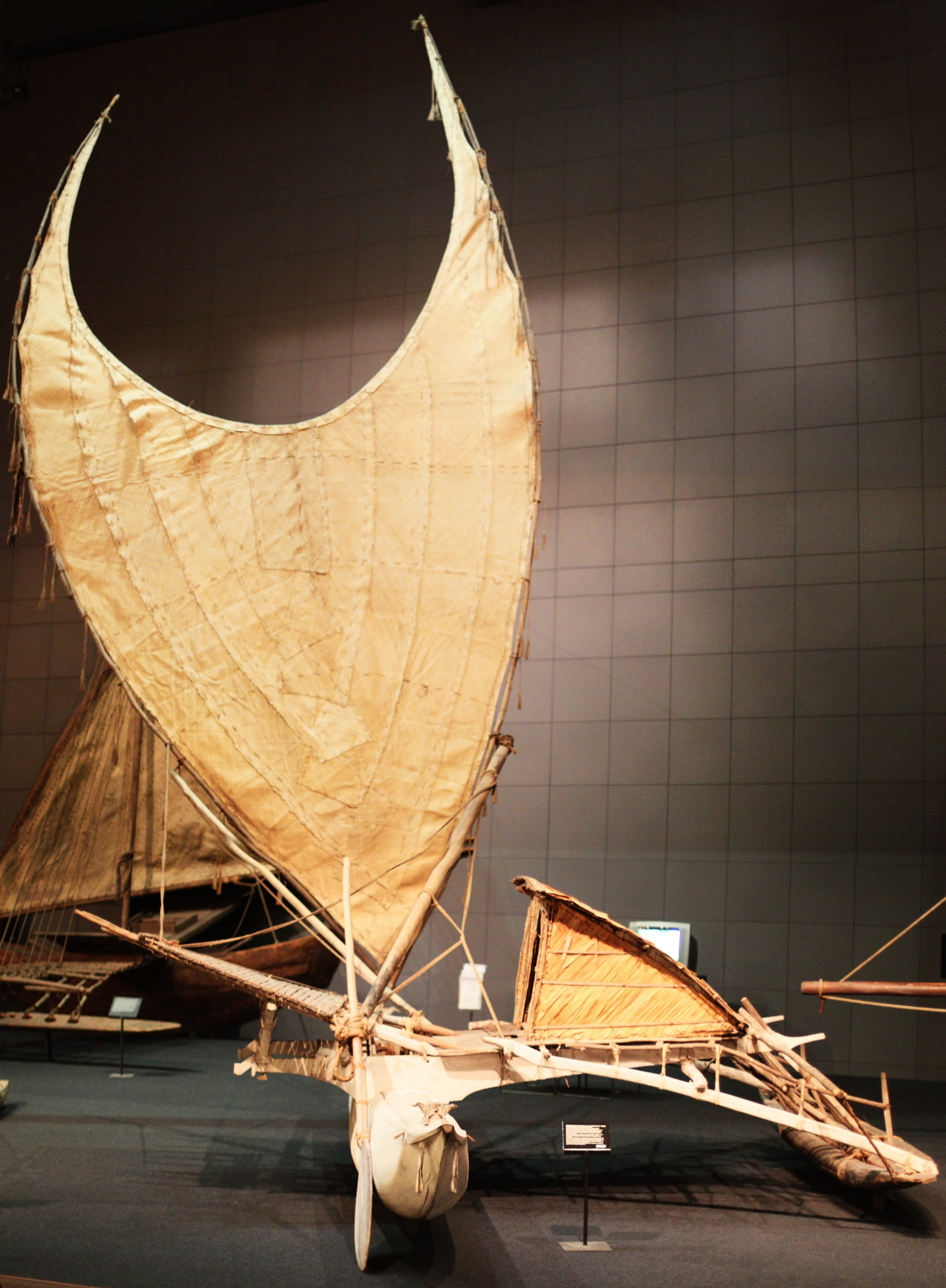
A tepukei from Taumako, Solomon Islands

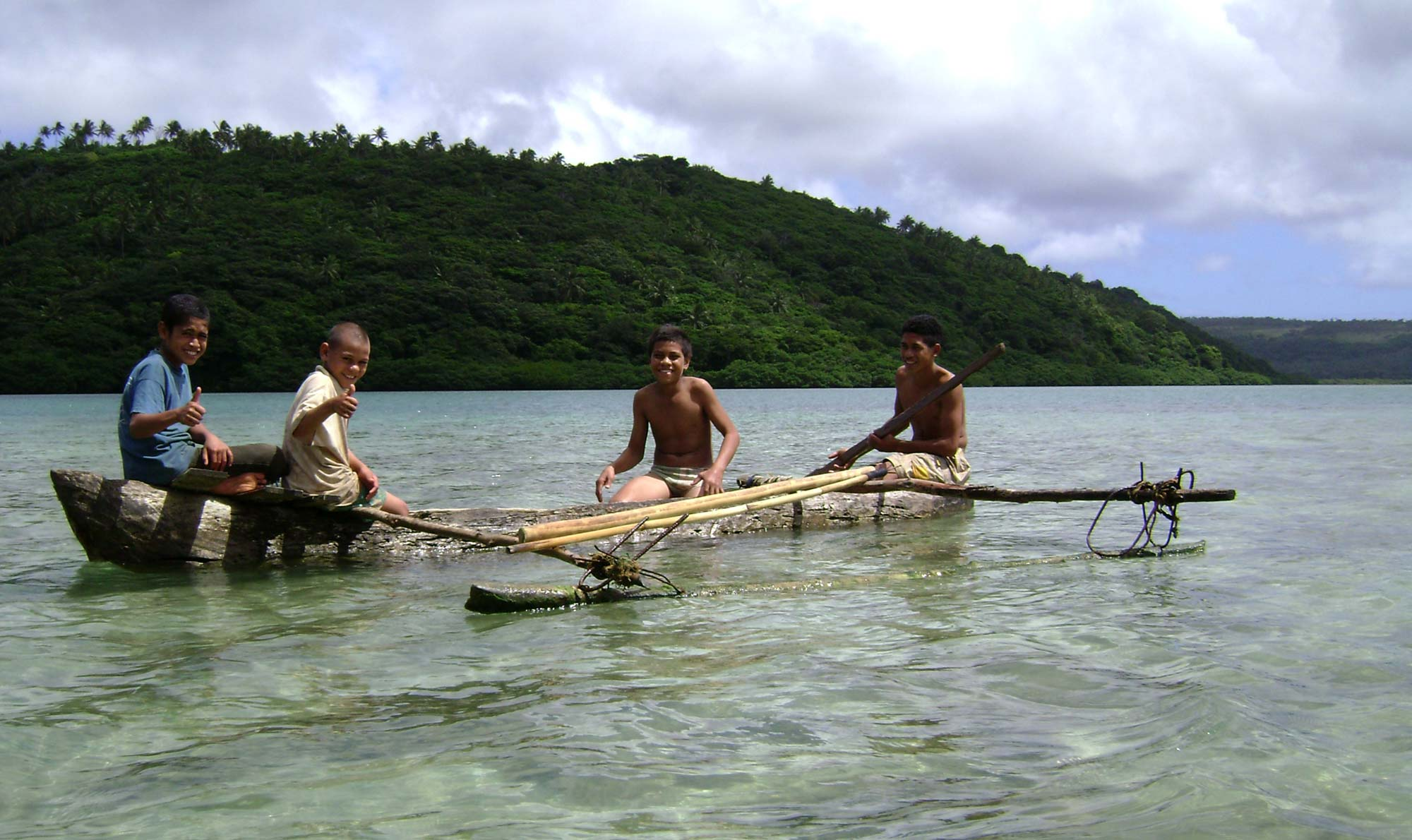
The traditional pōpao of Tonga

==== Fiji ====
- Camakau
- Drua (Wangga tabu)
- Takia

==== Papua New Guinea ====
- Lakatoi

==== Solomon Islands ====
- Tepukei

==== Vanuatu ====
- Aka
- Angga
- Wangga

==== Australia (Torres strait islands) ====
- kulbasaibai

=== Micronesia ===
A single-outrigger wa from Yap, Caroline Islands

==== Caroline Islands ====
- Wa
- Wahr
- Waserak

==== Kiribati ====
- Baurua

==== Marshall Islands ====
- Korkor
- Tipnol
- Walap

==== Mariana Islands, incl. Guam ====
- Ladjak
- Sakman (Flying proa)

==== Palau ====
- Kaep
- Wa

==== Yap ====
- Chugpin
- Popow
- Wa

=== Polynesia ===
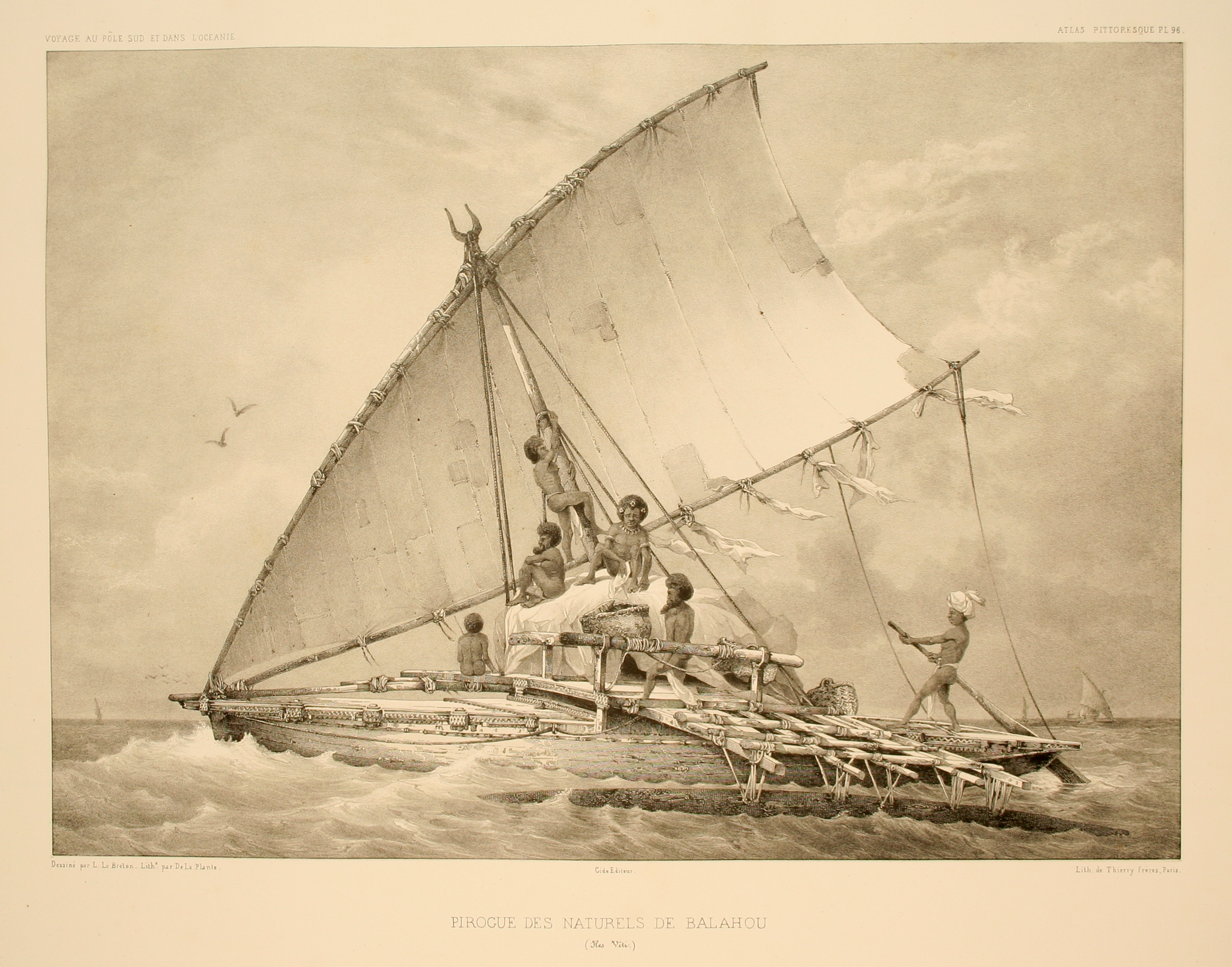
Illustration of a Fijian camakau (1846)

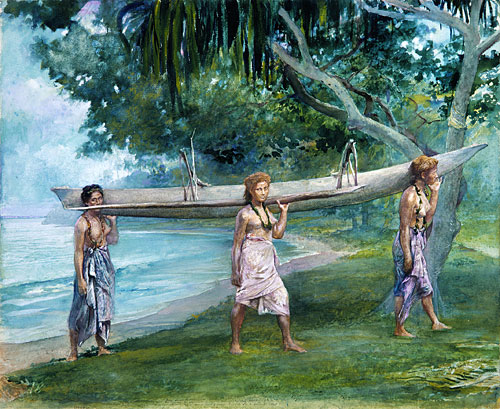
Painting by John LaFarge showing Samoan girls carrying a va'a (1891)

==== Cook Islands ====
- Vaka
- Vaka katea

==== Hawaiʻi ====
- Malia
- Wa'a
- Wa'a kaulua

==== Marquesas ====
- Vaka touʻua

==== New Zealand ====
- Waka ama
- Waka hourua

==== Samoa ====
- ʻAlia
- Amatasi
- Laʻau
- Lualua (Foulua)
- Paopao
- Vaʻa
- Vaʻa-alo
- Vaʻa-tele

==== Society Islands ====
- Ivahah
- Pahi
- Tipairua
- Vaʻa

==== Tonga ====
- Hamatafua
- Kalia
- Pōpao
- Tongiaki

==== Tuvalu ====
- Paopao

=== Madagascar ===
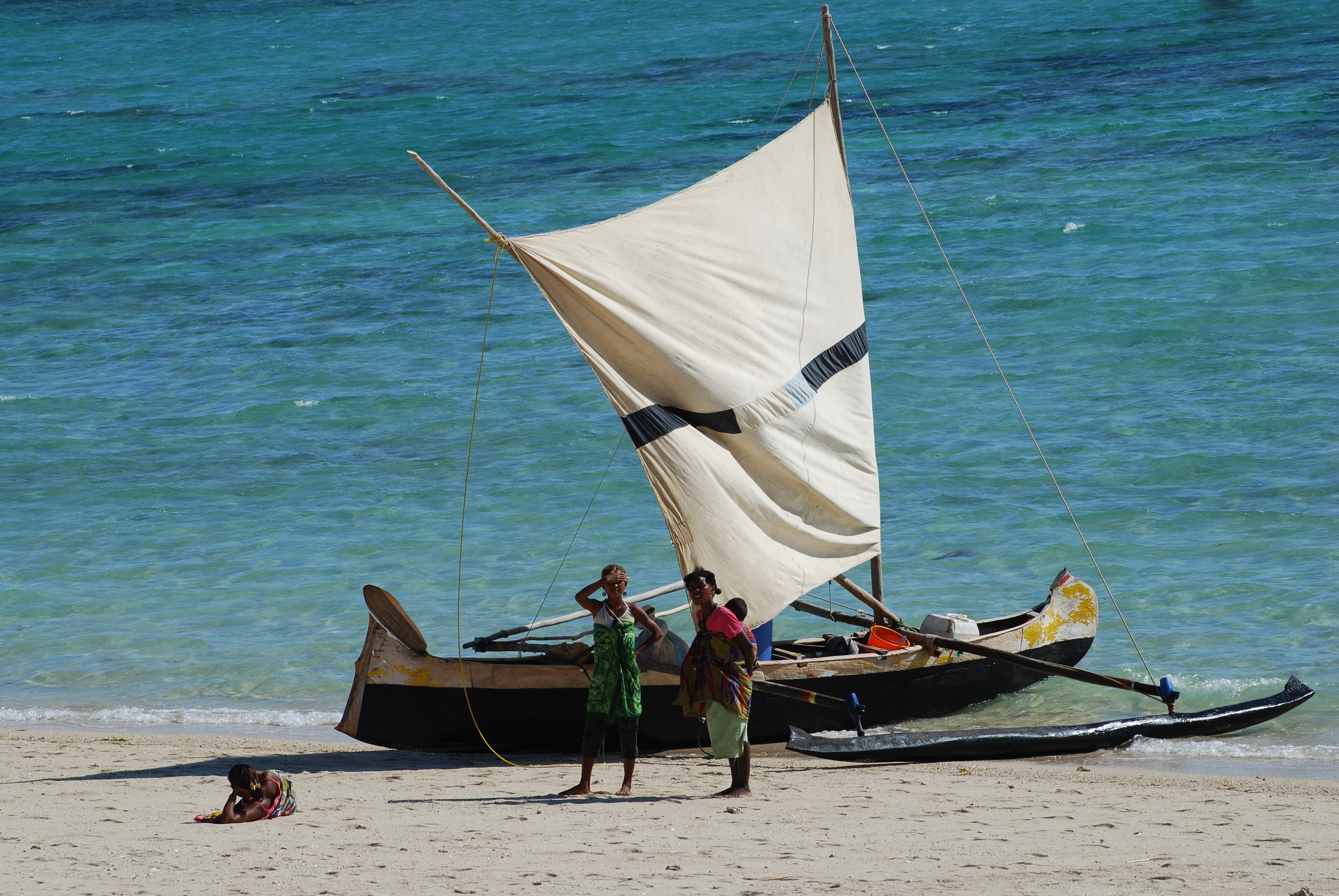
A single-outrigger lakana from Madagascar

- Lakana

=== Non-Austronesian outrigger boats ===
The following are traditional outrigger boats acquired by other cultures from contact with Austronesian sailors.

==== Sri Lanka ====
- Oruwa
- Yathra doni

==== East Africa ====
- Ngalawa
- Laana

==== Australia (Aboriginal) ====
- Aboriginal single outrigger canoe
- Aboriginal double outrigger canoe

==== Andaman and Nicobar Islands ====
- Sentinelese outrigger boat
- Nicobari canoe

== Modern sport ==
Outrigger canoe racing has become a popular canoeing sport, with numerous clubs located around the world. Outrigger Canoe Racing is the State sport of Hawaii and an interscholastic high school sport. In Hawaii, entire families participate in summer regattas with age groups from keiki (children as young as 6 with an adult steersperson) and age 12 through age 60+.

Major races in Hawaii include the Molokaʻi Hoe 43 mi (69 km) men's race from the island of Molokai to Oahu across the Kaiwi Channel, Na Wahine O Ke Kai (same race for women) and the Queen Liliʻuokalani Race held near Kona on the Island of Hawai'i.

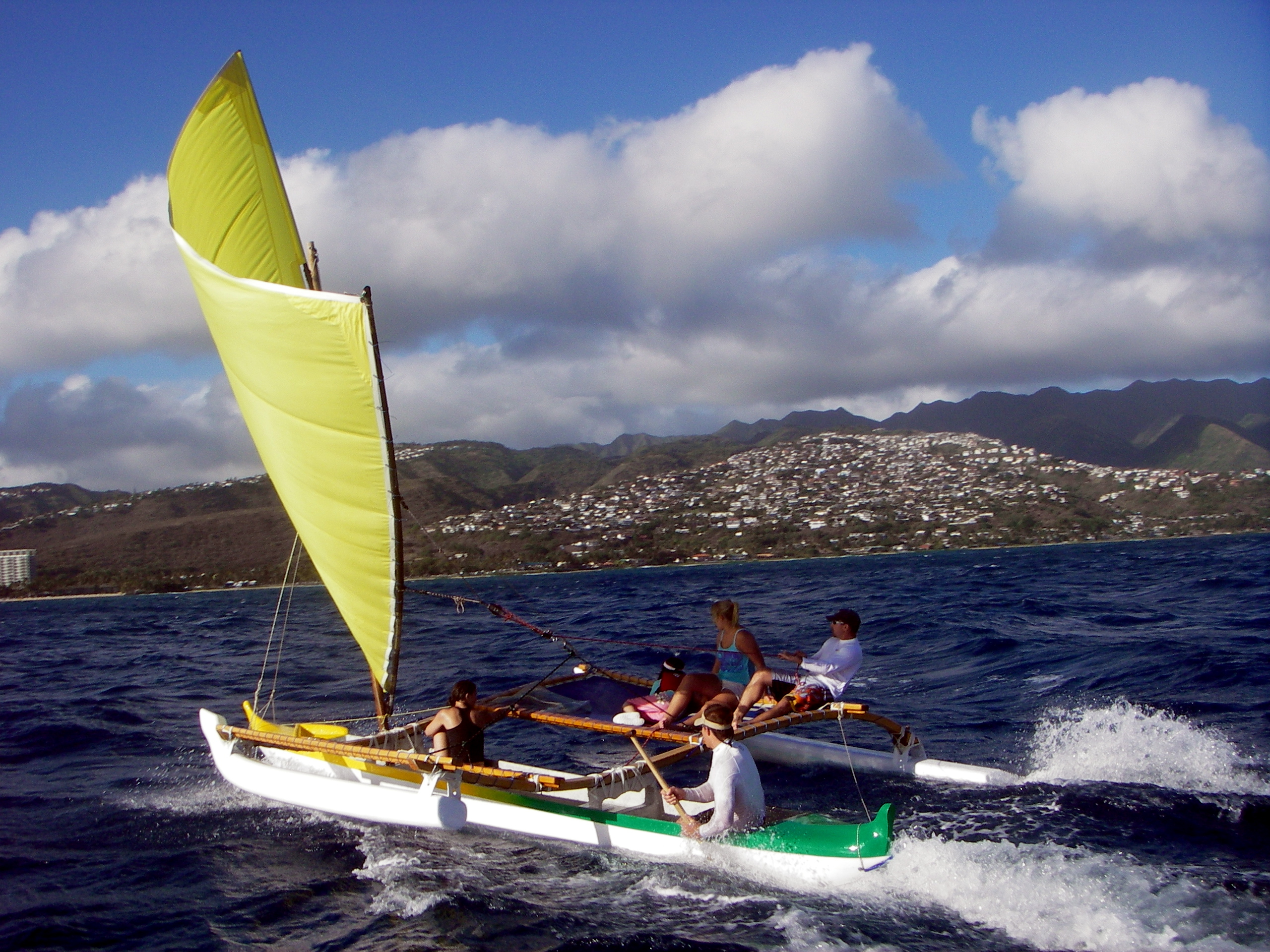
Modern double-outrigger canoe in Hawaii, US

In modern sport outrigger canoeing, ships are classified according to the configuration and number of the hulls and the number of paddlers, including the OC1, OC2, OC3, OC4 and OC6 (with the respective number of paddlers using a single-hull outrigger canoe), and the DC12 or OC12 (with twelve paddlers using a double-hull outrigger canoe, two six-person canoes rigged together like a catamaran). Outriggers without a rudder are referred to as V1, V2, etc. (where V refers to vaʻa).

Six-person outrigger canoes (or OC6) are among the most commonly used for sport use; single-person outrigger canoes (or OC1) are also very common. Two and four-person outrigger canoes are also sometimes used, and two six-person outrigger canoes are sometimes rigged together like a catamaran to form a twelve-person double canoe.

Modern OC6 hulls and amas are commonly made from glass-reinforced plastic. However, some canoes are made of more traditional materials. In Ancient Hawaii, canoes were carved from the trunks of very old koa trees. These canoes, although rare, are still very much in use today. The ʻiako are usually made of wood; the ʻiako-ama and ʻiako-hull connections are typically done with rope wrapped and tied in an interlocking fashion to reduce the risk of the connection coming completely apart if the rope breaks.

Modern OC1 hulls and amas are commonly made from glass-reinforced plastic, carbon fiber reinforced plastic, and/or Kevlar to produce a strong but light canoe. OC1 are often made with rudders operated by foot pedals. More traditional designs do not have rudders. OC1 commonly use ʻiako made of aluminium or carbon fiber, with a mechanism for quickly assembling and disassembling the canoe (snap buttons, large wing nuts, etc.).

=== Roles ===
In an outrigger canoe, the paddlers sit in line, facing toward the bow of the canoe (i.e., forward, in the direction of travel, unlike rowing). The seats are numbered from 1 (closest to the bow) to the number of seats in the canoe, usually 6. The steerer (or steersman or steersperson) sits in the last seat of the canoe (seat 6 in the common OC6) and, as the name indicates, is primarily responsible for steering. The paddler sitting in seat 1 is called the stroke (or stroker) and is responsible for setting the pace of the paddle strokes. The stroker should have a high level of endurance to keep the rate (the number of strokes taken in a given amount of time) manageable for whatever the situation may be. The first two positions may also be involved in certain steering manoeuvers. This usually involves the draw stroke. During a tight turn, the one seat might poke to make the canoe turn the opposite way. In the middle of the canoe (seats number 3 and 4) known as the powerhouse are the strong and powerful paddlers. Any of the 2 can be the 'caller' who directs when to switch over their blades, when to pick up or slow down the stroking pace, etc. Whoever is caller must have very good leadership skills and know how to think off the top of their heads in any situation. Every position has an important role to play in the canoe.

In an OC1, the single paddler must also steer the canoe. Some OC1s have rudders operated by foot pedals, while OC1s without rudders must be steered by drawing and paddling as needed for steering purposes while paddling to move the canoe forward.

==== Steersman ====
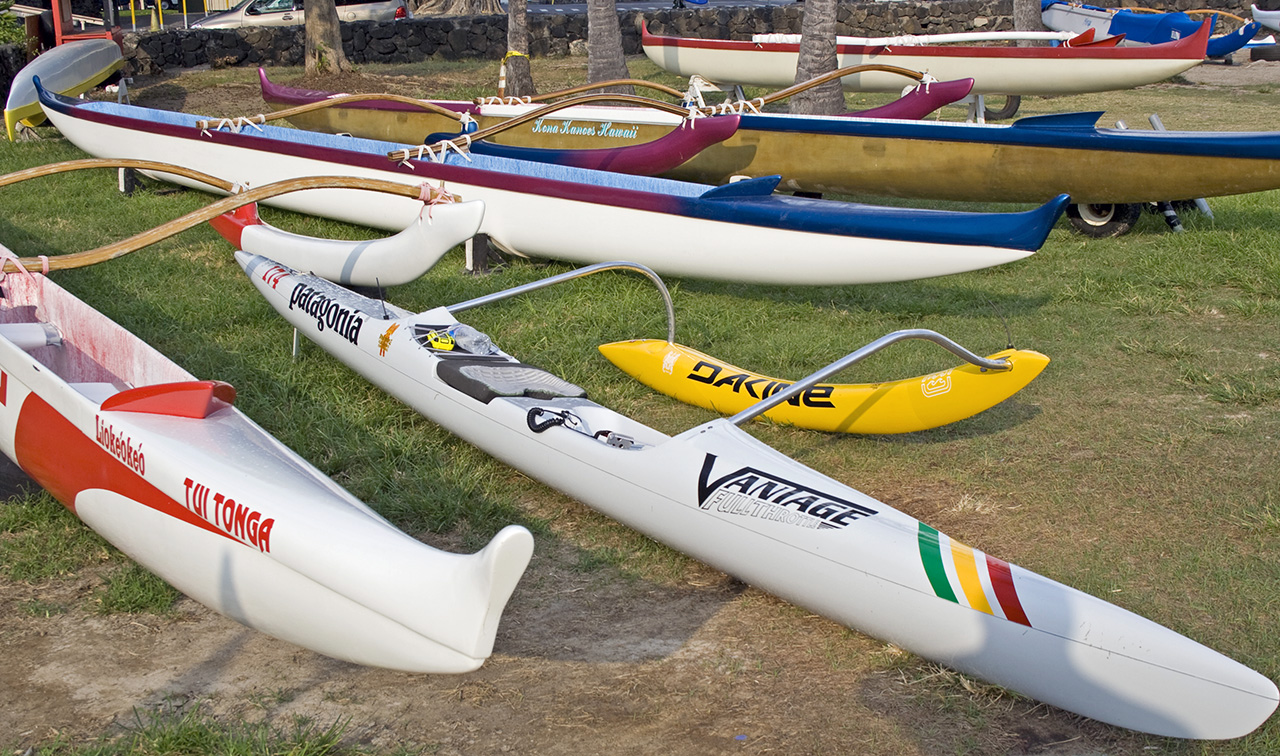
Racing outrigger canoes. The canoe in the front right, with a narrower hull and smaller body, is a single-person outrigger canoe, or OC1. The other canoes are six-person outrigger canoes or OC6.

A good steersman is able to maintain the straight attitude of the canoe throughout the course of a race, and also keep the boat and the crew safe in rough sea conditions. They may also take advantage of water conditions to gain extra speed by surfing. The steersman uses a single bladed steering paddle which has a larger blade than a standard outrigger paddle, is built stronger, and has less or no bend in its shaft. They steer by the following methods:

- Poking: holding the paddle vertically against the side of the canoe, causing drag on that side to cause the canoe to turn that direction. (left to go left and right to go right)
- Drawing: paddling at a 45 to 90-degree angle to pull water under the canoe, causing the canoe to turn the opposite direction.
- Posting: holding the paddle in the water out to the side with the forward edge angled opposite to the desired turn direction, usually as a prelude to drawing.
- Paddling: by applying power on one side of the canoe, the steersman can influence to a small degree which way the canoe will turn. Paddling also increases the total power moving the canoe forward compared to the other steering methods. The steersman should try and paddle as much as possible so he or she doesn't slow down the canoe by contributing to the amount of weight in the canoe.

A steersman also skippers the canoe and instructs all other paddlers as necessary. As an outrigger canoe is a long narrow canoe with the steersman placed at the very end, the steersman must give instructions sufficiently loudly and clearly for the entire crew to hear. From a water safety perspective the steersman should also be among the most experienced crew members, and be knowledgeable with the waterways and weather conditions, relevant maritime rules and other safety considerations such as the use of personal flotation devices, rigging of the canoe, placement of paddlers in the various seating positions, and recovery from a huli by righting the canoe and bailing out the water. The steersman should also be able to keep the ama down during rough water.

==== Paddlers ====
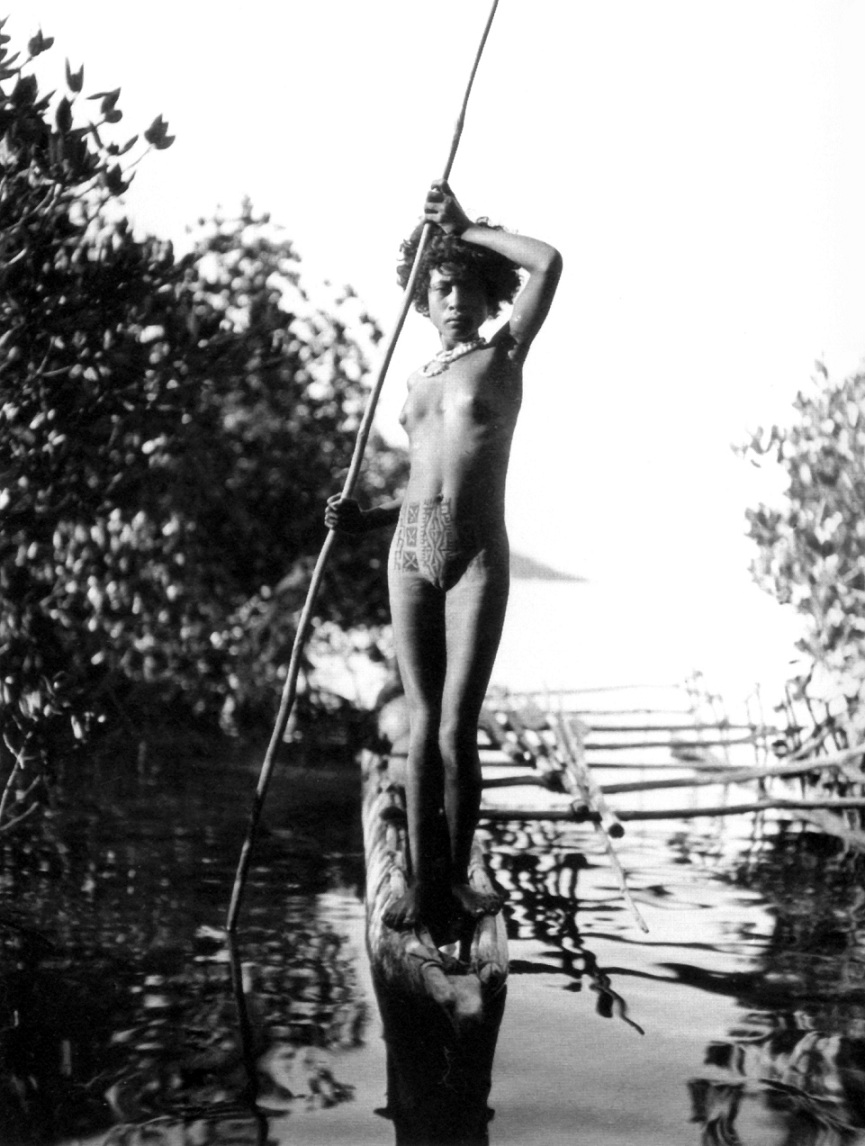
1907 paddler from New Guinea

Paddlers use single-bladed paddles, usually with single or double bent shafts. The paddling stroke is similar to that of most other racing canoe paddling strokes, involving primarily core and lat strength. Generally, each paddler paddles on the opposite side from the paddler in directly front (for example, in an OC6, paddlers in seats 1, 3, and 5 paddle on one side, while paddlers in seats 2 and 4 paddle on the other side). All paddlers switch sides simultaneously on a call from one who is the designated caller. The steerer may paddle either side or switch sides as needed for steering purposes. The steersman will also switch sides to keep the ama from popping up and capsizing the canoe.

Stronger paddlers are typically placed in the middle of the canoe, while paddlers with the most endurance tend to be placed at the front, as the lead paddler sets the pace for the crew. All other paddlers synchronize their strokes to the paddler in front of them (whom they can directly see).

In rough water, it is often desirable to have a paddler with steering skill in seat 5 (of an OC6), to allow for the steerer to have that paddler also take steering strokes if needed in some situations. In conditions when the boat is surfing, the stern of the canoe will be so far out of the water that seat 5 will have to keep the boat on course. A seat 5 paddler with steering skill can also assist in preventing a huli by staying on the ama side during a particularly rough stretch of water.

In water rough enough to splash into the canoe, paddlers also need to pay attention to the water level in the canoe, report the situation to the steerer, and bail out the water as necessary. Paddlers also need to know how to recover from a huli under the steerer's direction.

In a quick turn situation, paddlers at the front may also be instructed to une (poke steer, causes the canoe to turn the opposite direction) or kahi (post and draw steer, pulls the canoe to the side where this is done) to help bring the canoe around a turn quickly.

=== Racing ===
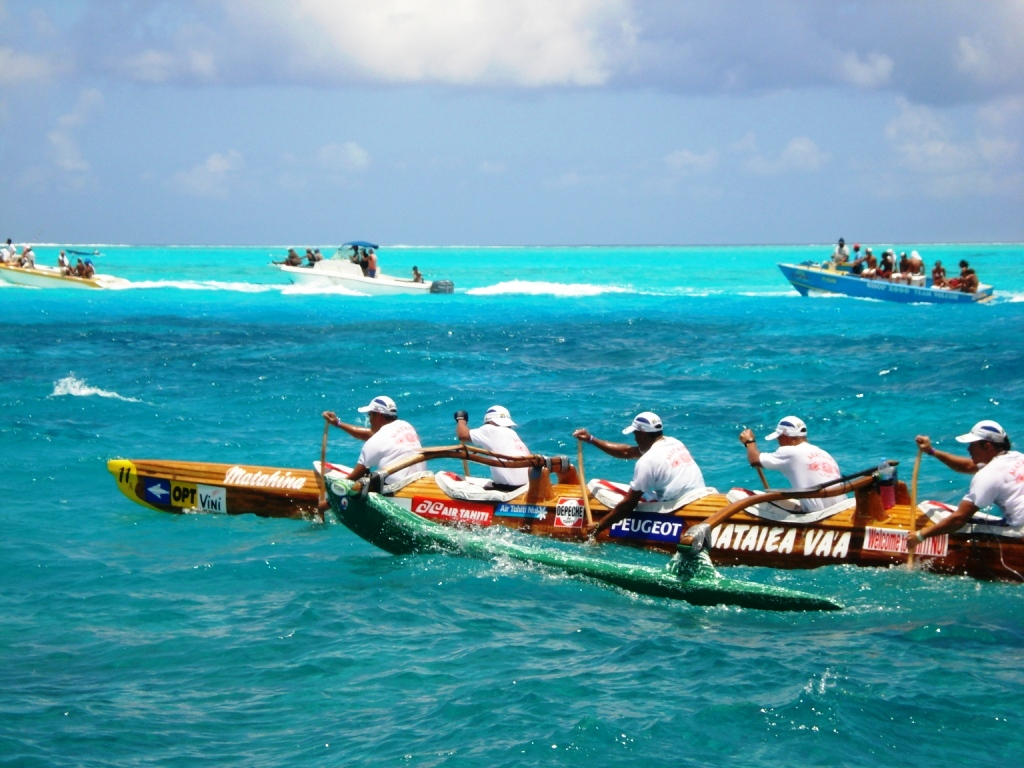
Hawaiki Nui Va'a i race in French Polynesia

The length of a race ranges from short sprints (e.g., 250–500 metres for the OC1 and the OC12, 500–2000 metres (usually includes turns) for the OC6) to longer events, including marathons (e.g., 42 kilometres). A number of races are raced over distances that far exceed 42 kilometres, including the Molokaʻi Hoe that crosses the Kaiwi Channel between the islands of Molokai and Oahu in Hawaii. However, long-distance races of 20 to 30 kilometres are more common, with shorter 5 to 8 kilometre courses typically being offered to novice paddlers and those under 20 years of age.

Longer races involving the OC6 often involve paddler replacements, which involve exit and entry to the canoe directly from the water while the canoe is underway (this is called a water change). Typically, nine paddlers form a crew, with six paddling the OC6 and the other three resting, drinking, and/or eating on an escort boat. Replacement typically occurs at 20 to 30 minute intervals; the escort boat drops the relief paddlers into the water ahead of the OC6, which is steered toward them. The relief paddlers climb in on the ama side as those they are replacing roll out into the water on the opposite side. The escort boat then picks up the paddlers in the water so that they can rest, drink, and/or eat before they, in turn, relieve some of the paddlers in the OC6.

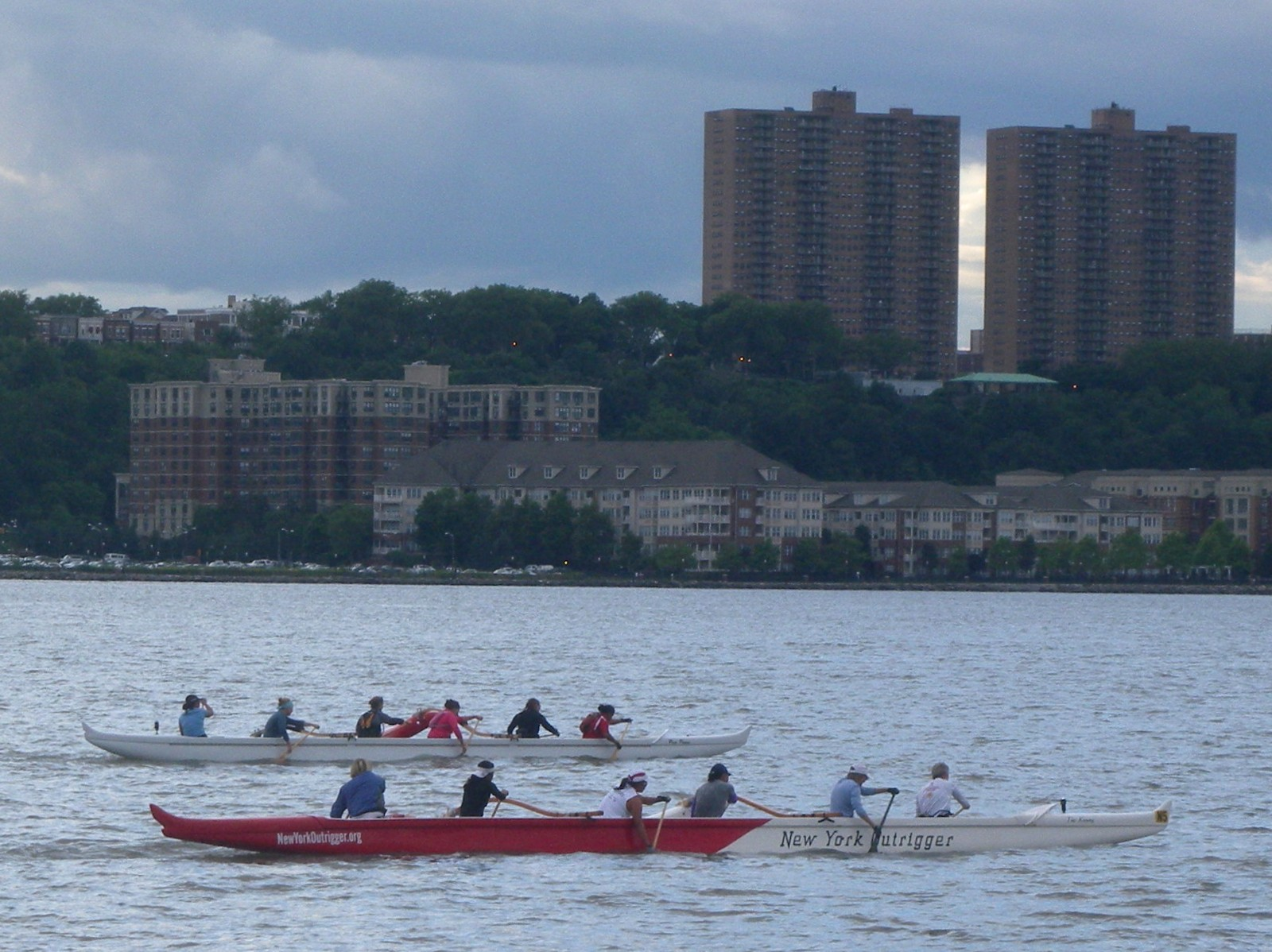
Outrigger canoe racing in Hudson River, New York

The longer races are typically conducted in the open ocean, e.g., between islands in the South Pacific. The Molokaʻi Hoe in Hawaii, The Hamilton Cup in Australia, The Vaka Eiva in Rarotonga (Cook Islands), The Motu2Motu in Aitutaki (Cook Islands) and the Catalina Channel crossing in California are four examples of races involving water changes.

Paddlers and crews are usually classified by gender and age. Gender classification is typically straightforward, with male, female, and coed classifications, with the latter being a crew with equal numbers of male and female paddlers (different rules may apply to nine-person coed crews doing a race with paddler replacements). Age classifications typically include youth divisions like 19-and-under, 16-and-under, etc., master divisions with minimum ages typically starting at 35 or 40 years of age, and an open division which allows paddlers of any age. A novice division for paddlers with less than a specified number of years of race experience (usually one or two) may also exist in a given association.

In some races, a particular type of outrigger canoe, usually a more traditional design for the region, may be given its own racing classification. For example, races in Hawaii have a koa division, while southern California has a Bradley OC6 division and northern California OC1 sprint races have a traditional (no rudder) division.

=== Paddling around the world ===
The sport of outrigging has travelled worldwide and is now prominent in countries around the world. Clubs exist worldwide in the countries detailed below

Hawaii

Outrigger canoe paddling is a popular sport and cultural tradition, with many clubs and competitions.

Fiji

Outrigger canoe racing (va'a) is a significant part of Fijian culture and is even featured in the Pacific Games,.

Tahiti

Outrigger canoes, known as va'a, are a national sport and are used for various purposes like fishing, travel, and racing.

Hong Kong

A Hong Kong group has introduced and promotes outrigger canoes and their cultural significance. There are many clubs within the special administrative region such as the Victoria Recreational Club (VRC), The Royal Hong Kong Yacht Club (RHKYC), and the Lamma Outrigger Canoe Club located around Hong Kong

Sri Lanka

Outrigger canoes are used for fishing, and research is ongoing to improve their design and materials, according to the FAO.

East Africa

While less prominent than in the Pacific, outrigger canoes like the ungalawa are used in Tanzania for fishing and transportation.

==== Organisations ====
The International Va'a Federation (IVF) oversees va'a racing worldwide, including the IVF World Championships and at the Pacific Games.

Outrigger racing organizations in the United States include the East Coast Outrigger Racing Association (ECORA), the Hawaiian Canoe Racing Association (HCRA), the Northern California Outrigger Canoe Association (NCOCA), the Southern California Outrigger Canoe Association (SCORA), and several more.

== See also ==
- Ama and Aka
- Austronesian maritime trade network
- Burulan
- Canoe sailing
- Catamaran
- Crab claw sail
- Daramba
- Hiri trade cycle
- Kula ring
- Lapita culture
- Lashed-lug boat
- Maritime Silk Road
- Marshall Islands stick chart
- Multihull
- Polynesian multihull terminology
- Polynesian navigation
- Proa
- Sa Huynh-Kalanay Interaction Sphere
- Tanja sail
- Trimaran
- Weriyeng
