= Sakman =

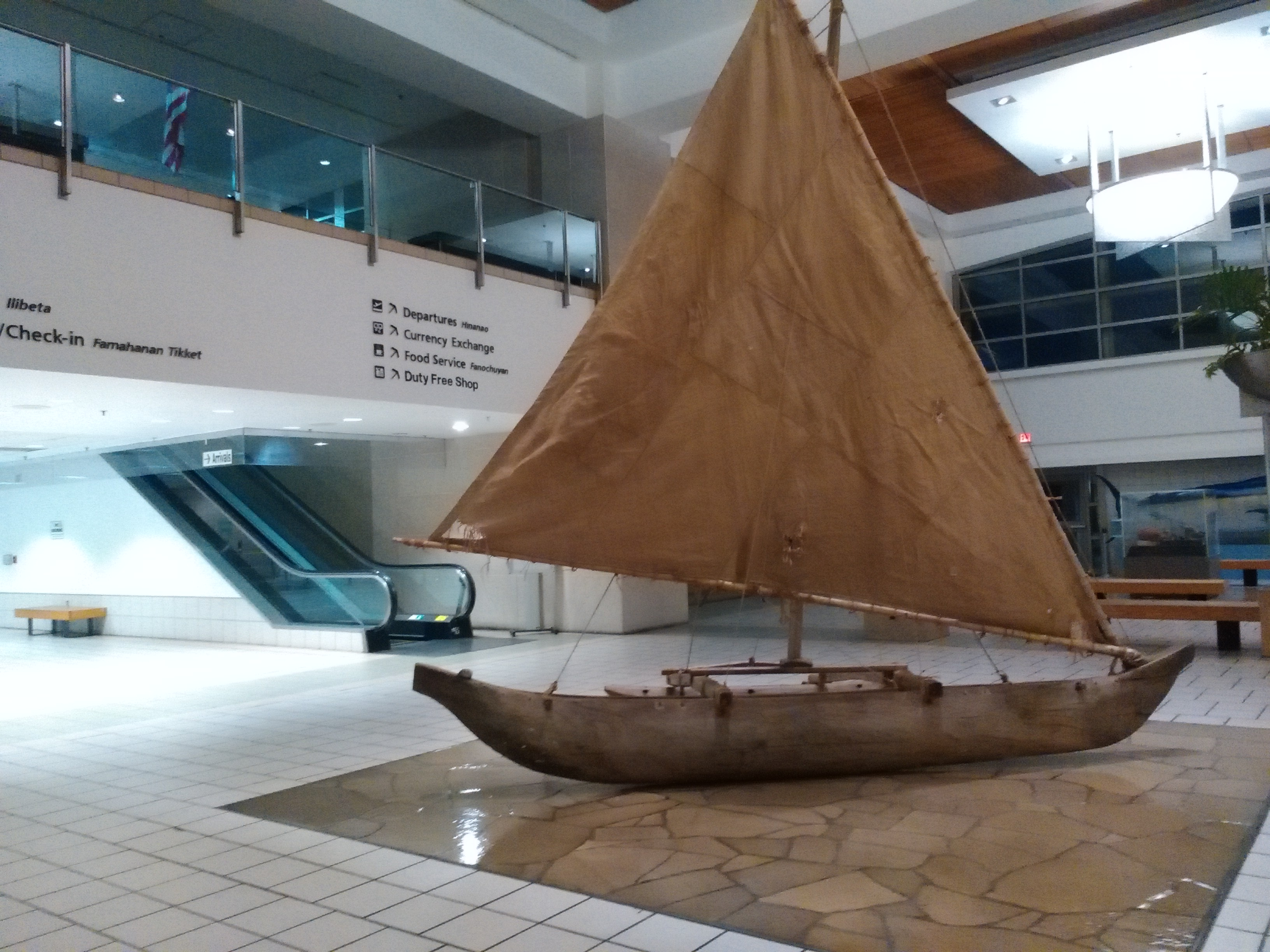
A small "flying proa" displayed in the Antonio B. Won Pat International Airport in Guam

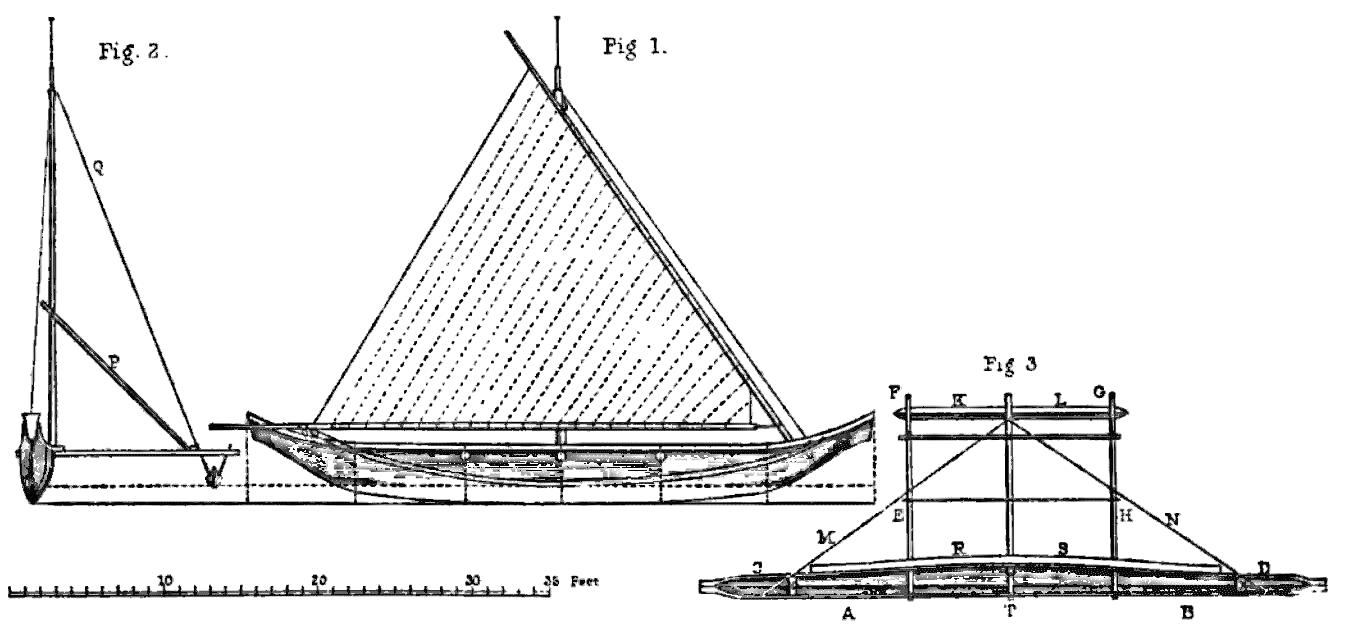
Plan of a "flying proa", from a 1742 sketch by Lt. Peircy Brett, an officer on Lord Anson's round-the-world voyage

Sakman, better known in western sources as flying proas, are traditional sailing outrigger boats of the Chamorro people of the Northern Marianas. They are characterized by a single outrigger and a crab claw sail. They are the largest native sailing ships (ladjak) of the Chamorro people. Followed by the slightly smaller lelek and the medium-sized duding. They are similar to other traditional sailing ships of Micronesia, like the wa, baurua, and the walap. These ships were once used for trade and transportation between islands.

== Description ==
Sakman was a single-outrigger boat. Its basic design consists of a very narrow dugout canoe which served as the main hull, to which an outrigger was attached on one side. The main hull was typically around 30 to 40 ft (9.1 to 12.2 m) long, but only around 2 ft (0.61 m) wide and 3 ft (0.91 m) deep. It had a single mast known as the palu, and a steering oar known as the umulin. A platform was usually built on the spars connecting the main hull and the outrigger, which was used to carry cargo and passengers.

The hull was typically painted with protective designs in white, black, red, and orange using ochre, lime (afok), and coconut oil and soot. It was rigged with a crab claw sail made from woven mats of pandanus leaves (akgak). The canoes were usually made from dokdok (breadfruit) trees. They were hollowed out and carved by men. The sails (layak) were woven by women.

The main hull was asymmetrical on its left and right sides to counteract the drag of the outrigger float. However, it was symmetrical at both ends, which meant the boat can be sailed in reverse. This was a necessity to accomplish the shunting technique, in which the outrigger was always kept windward. This allowed the boats to sail leeward without having to turn the ship.

== History ==
The sakman were the very first Pacific outrigger boats encountered by Europeans. The Venetian scholar Antonio Pigafetta, who was part of Ferdinand Magellan's 1519–1522 circumnavigation, mistakenly described the outrigger hull as a "small boat fastened astern". Magellan's crew were impressed by the ships' speed, maneuverability, and their ability to reverse directions. They were the first accounts that described the sakman as "flying." Further accounts by the Spanish described the sakman as being capable of sailing from Guam to Manila in only four days, averaging more than 20 miles (32 km) per hour.

During his 1740–1744 circumnavigation, Lord Anson applied the term proa to the sakman. His fleet captured one in 1742, and Lt. Peircy Brett of HMS Centurion made a detailed sketch of it. Rev. Richard Walter, chaplain of HMS Centurion, estimated the speed of the sakman at twenty miles per hour (32 km/h). Although aware of earlier Spanish accounts of the boats of the Spanish East Indies, Anson's account was the first detailed description of a sakman to the English-speaking world. These accounts fascinated both the British and American public, ushering in a period of interest in the design by sports sailors. Working from the drawings and descriptions of explorers, western builders often took liberties with the traditional designs, merging their interpretation of native designs with Western boat building methods. Thus this Western "proa" often diverged radically from the sakman to the point that the only shared feature was the windward/leeward hull arrangement.

The Chamorro population was near-decimated during the Spanish colonial period after the ravages of epidemics of European diseases, as well as wars with the Spanish. The Spanish also forbade the sakman to be sailed in open ocean, leading to the eventual erosion of sailing skills. The techniques of building sakman and other traditional sailing ships were lost some time during the 19th century. However, there have been attempts in modern times to revive the sakman traditions. The first sakman to be built after nearly 200 years was the Saina, which was built between 2007 and 2008.

== See also ==
- Austronesian peoples
- Outrigger canoe
- Catamaran
- Fanuankuwel
- Marshall Islands stick chart
- Mau Piailug
- Polynesian navigation
- Proa
- Weriyeng
