= Walap =

Type of canoe

The Walap is a traditional ocean-going sailing outrigger canoe from the Marshall Islands.

Walap from Jaluit Atoll, 1880

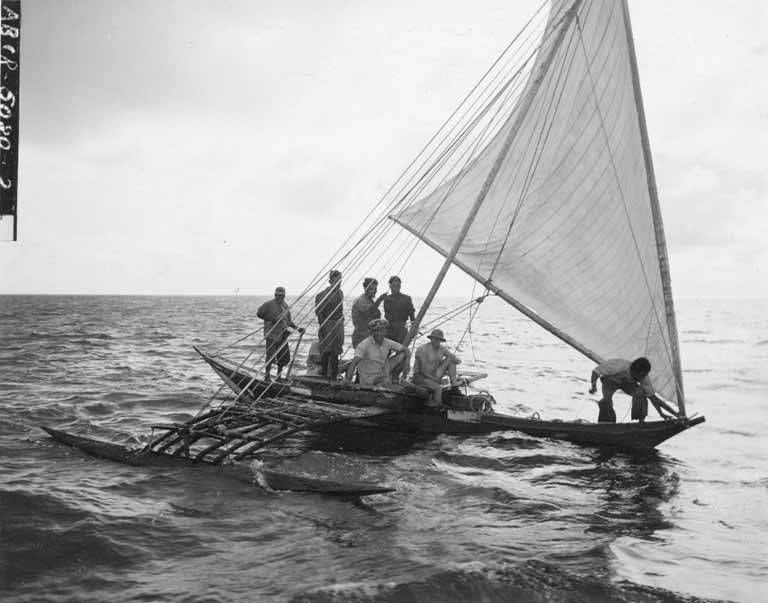
A tipnol from Rongerik Atoll (1947)

It belongs to the Micronesian proa type whose main characteristics are: single main hull, outrigger-mounted float/ballast, and asymmetric hull profile. Walaps have a lee platform.

Like all pacific proas, they are always sailed with the outrigger to windward; they do not tack but "shunt" (reverse direction), so both ends of the boat are identical. The distinction between bow and stern depends only on the heading of the boat.

Walaps are not dugouts; only the keel is made of a single bread-fruit log when possible, and the rest are planks sewn together with coconut-fiber lashings, sealed with tree sap.

There are three main types of marshallese sailing canoes:

- Korkor: a small rowing/sailing canoe used for fishing and transportation in the atoll lagoons. It has a crew of one or two. Used nowadays in very popular regattas.
- Tipnol: a medium-sized sailing canoe. Used for travel and fishing in the lagoons and short distance voyaging over open water. Minimum crew is two, may transport up to ten passengers.
- Walap: a large, blue-water sailing canoe, reaching up to 30 m in length and able to carry up to 50 people and food supplies for up to seven months. Used mainly for inter-atoll voyaging.

These types can vary in design, mainly slenderness of the hull, draft deep and hull-profile asymmetry.

Five recognized styles exist: taburbur, malmel, mwijwitok, tojeik and jekad.

Walaps may well represent the most advanced sailing technology of all stone-age cultures, only equaled by Fiji's drua.
