= Kalia (watercraft) =

Polynesian sailing watercraft

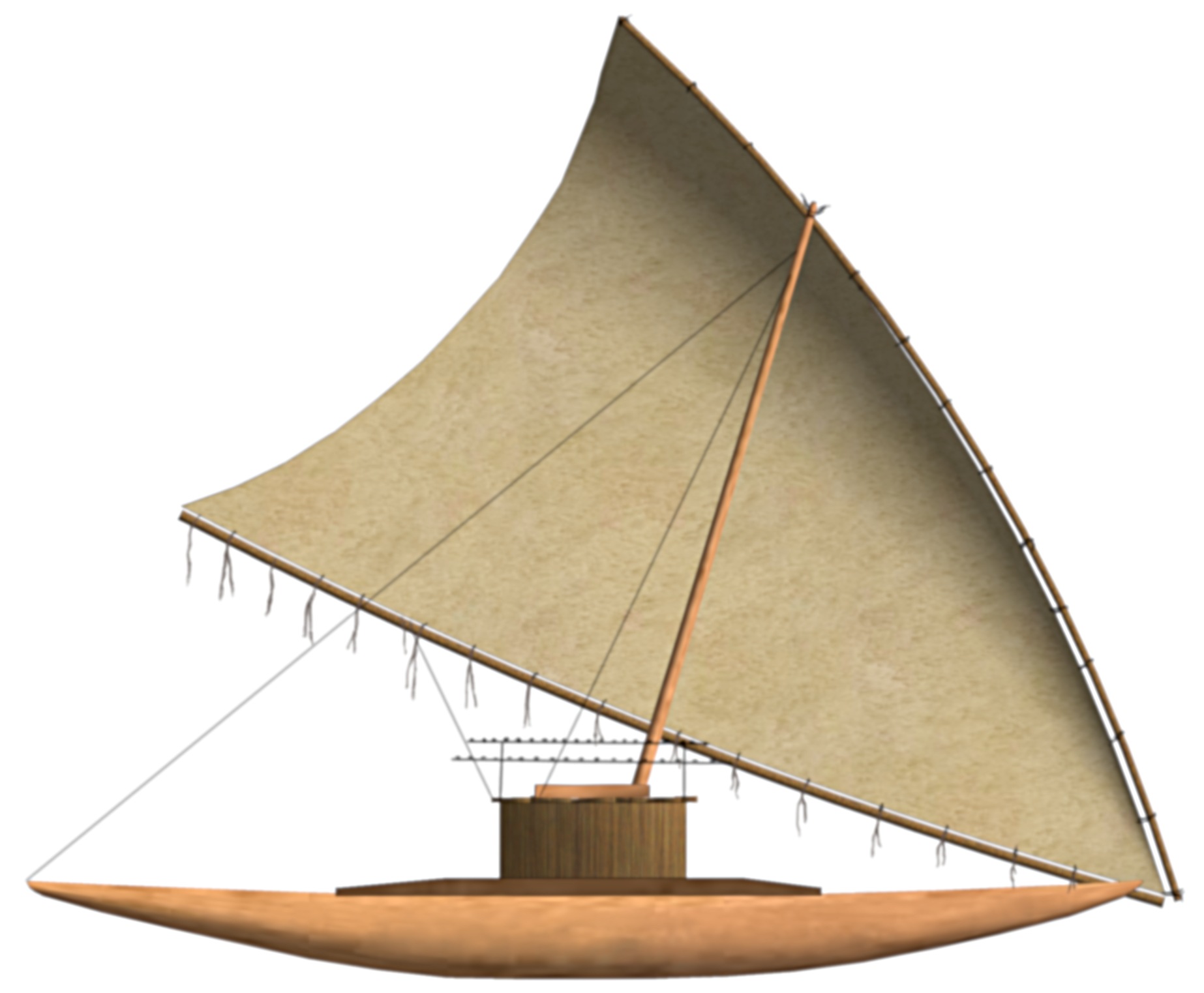
Tongan Kalia modelled in Google SketchUp and decorated in Gimp

Kalia is the Tongan adaptation of a drua or double-hulled Polynesian sailing watercraft.
