= ʻAlia =

Samoan Watercraft

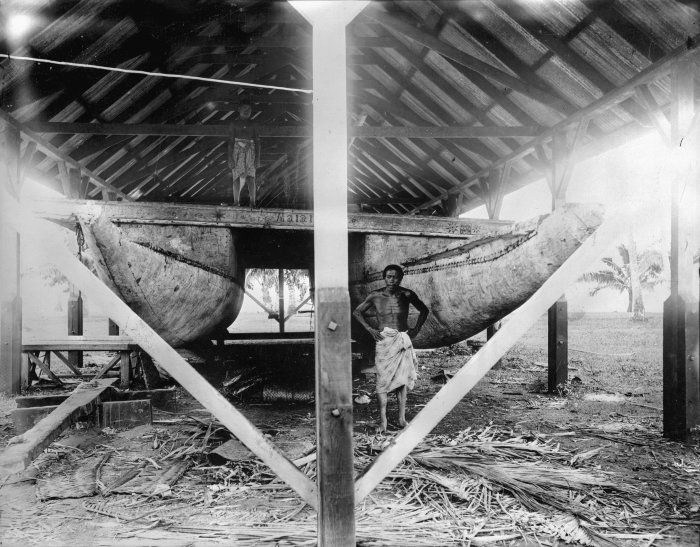
Double hulled va'a tele (large ship or ocean-going vessel) or 'alia at Mulinu'u on Upolu Island, Samoa, circa 1910. A man stands in front of va'a with child standing on vessel behind. Photographer possibly Louis John Daroux.

ʻAlia is the Samoan adaptation of a drua or double-hulled Polynesian sailing watercraft. They could be over 70 feet and carry more than 100 men. These ships were built in the 18th century and was meant for war, they mostly carried cannons, which they used for wars. Similar ships mostly boarded each other, where they created a type of platform, where the warriors fought on.
