= Tongiaki =

Native watercraft of Tonga

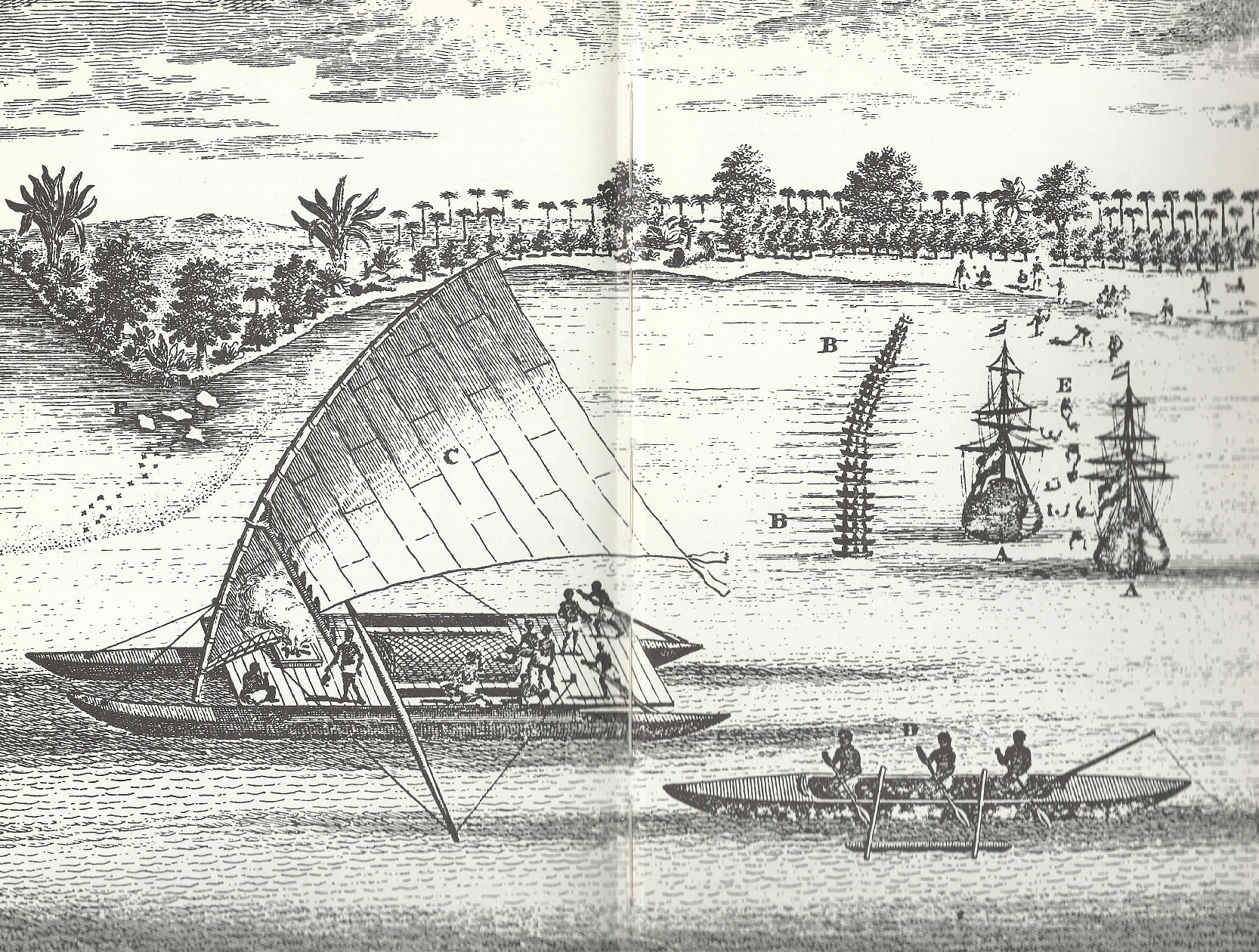
A Tongan tongiaki with bonito fishing canoe in foreground seen by Tasman, 1643.

Tongiaki are native watercraft of Tonga. They are double-hulled canoes in the Austronesian tradition, similar to catamarans.

== See also ==
- outrigger canoe
