= Ladjak =

Sailing terminology

Ladjak (meaning "sail" in Chamorro) was a general term referring to both sails woven from pandanus leaves and to single-outrigger canoes ("proas") fitted with a sail. These vessels include the very large sakman (usually known as "flying proas" in historical records), the slightly smaller lelek, the medium-sized duding, and the small duduli. It excludes the panga and the galaide’, which were not fitted with sails.

== See also ==
- Austronesian peoples
