= Malia (canoe) =

Hawaiian-style wooden racing canoe

- Malia (Hawaiian canoe)
- U.S. National Register of Historic Places
- Location within Hawaii
- Location: Jct. of Kapiolani Blvd. and McCully St., SE corner, Honolulu, Hawaii
- Coordinates: 21°17′30″N 157°50′5″W
- Area: less than one acre
- Built: 1933
- Architect: James Takeo Yamasaki
- Architectural style: Wooden dugout canoe
- NRHP reference No.: 93001385
- Added to NRHP: December 17, 1993

Mālia is a Hawaiian-style wooden racing canoe crafted by James Takeo Yamasaki. The canoe was hewn out of blonde koa wood in Kailua-Kona, Hawaii, in 1933. Its wooden hull provided the founding model for all subsequent outrigger canoeing hulls, including those later molded from fiberglass. Hawaiian racing canoeist Tommy Holmes observed that Malia "remains a prototype for contemporary racing canoes [and] was among the first canoes built exclusively for the sport." The canoe was listed on the State and National Register of Historic Places in 1993.

== Background ==
Outrigger canoe racing became popular in Hawaiʻi during the early 1900s. Prince Jonah Kūhiō Kalaniana'ole was an early aficionado and commissioned the first canoe specifically built for racing, the ʻAʻa in 1902. Despite weighing 620 lbs., it won many races. Lighter and more streamlined canoes continued to evolve in the following decades as common fishing canoe designs were adapted for racing purposes.

== Design ==
Mālia, a ~40-ft., 400-lb. canoe designed by James Takeo Yamasaki, was the culmination of a design evolution in wooden racing canoes, and it established the model for outrigger racing canoes made of newer, lighter materials. The original Hawaiian name Mālie refers to the relatively calm waters of the Kona Coast on the leeward side of the Big Island, the site where the canoe was made. The Outrigger Canoe Club bought the original Mālia in 1940, and the Waikiki Surf Club acquired it in 1948, keeping it in use until 1988. From 1950-1951, the design of Malia was modified by Froiseth, Downing, and Choy. In 1959, the original Mālia won the first outrigger canoe race to Catalina Island in California. After the race, the Malia had a significant impact on the historical development of the racing canoe. According to Tommy Holmes:

An interesting sidelight of the first Catalina-to-Newport race in 1959 was the alleged pirating of a fiberglass plug of the Malia. This shell, reportedly taken without authorization while the Malia awaited shipment back to Hawaiʻi, was later made into a mold. From this mold, and the hulls that came from it, other molds were made. The majority of the fiberglass canoes in use in Hawaiʻi and California today have been made from these molds. Thus the Malia inadvertently sired a noble fleet of fiberglass-and-resin-canoes.

In 1960, a California-made fiberglass model of the Mālia competed in the annual paddling race across the Molokaʻi Channel (the Molokaʻi Hoe) to Oʻahu, leading to a separate division for Malia-style fiberglass canoes in 1960–78. By 1981, models of the Mālia had begun spreading to Australia, Britain, Canada, Japan, Samoa, and to the shores of the Atlantic Ocean, Gulf Coast, and Great Lakes across the United States.

== Usage and importance ==
The term Malia canoe now refers to a class of Hawaiian-style outrigger canoes that follow the design of the original Mālia, even when made of fiberglass. Every serious outrigger canoe club, however, aims to acquire at least one Mālia made of koa wood and other traditional materials.
