= Drua =

Double-hull sailing boat

CAD Ndrua, based on the Sema Makawa

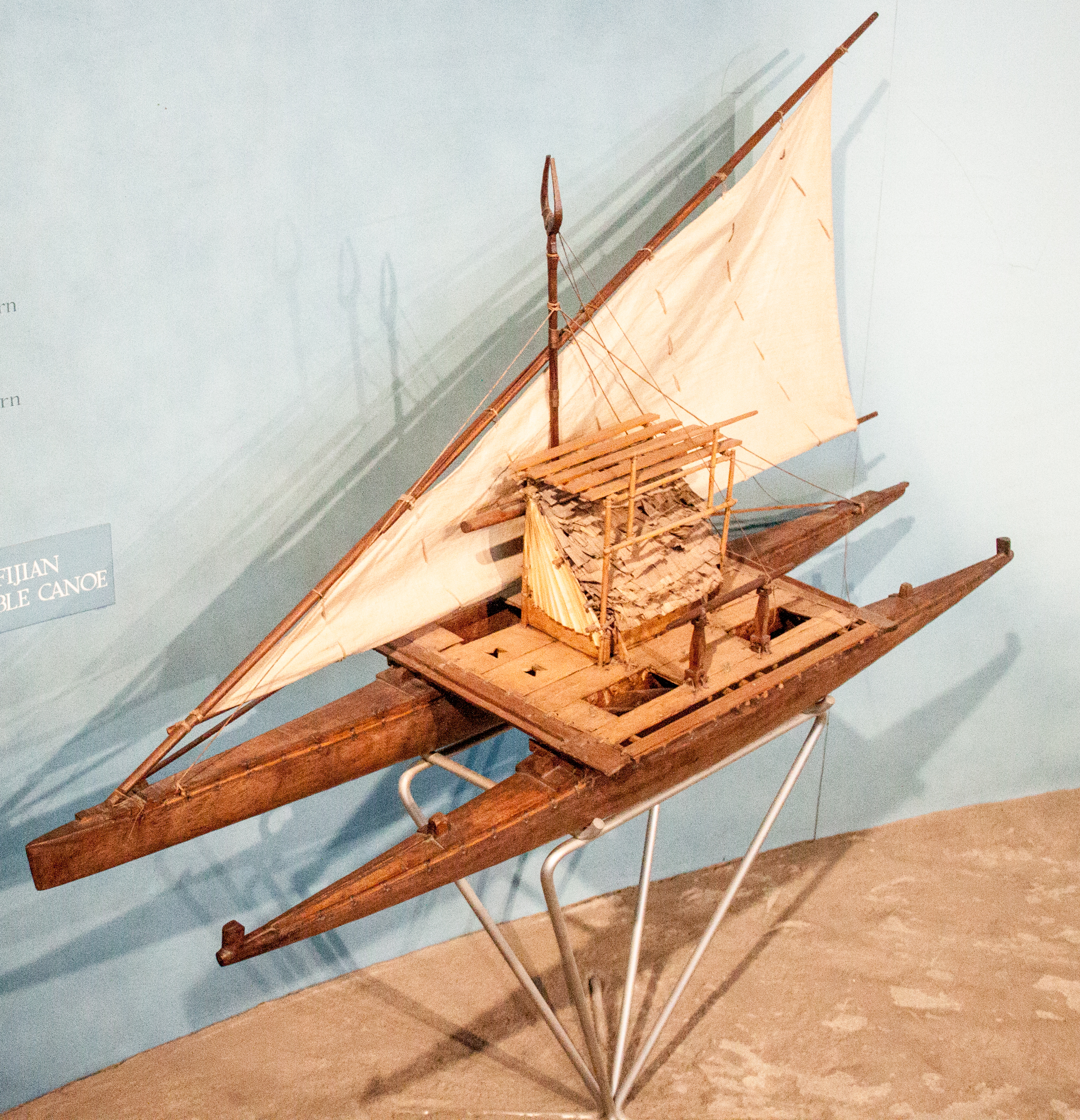
Model of a drua from Fiji in the Otago Museum

Drua, also known as na drua, n'drua, ndrua or waqa tabu ("sacred canoe", Fijian pronunciation: [waᵑɡa taᵐbu]), is a double-hull sailing boat that originated in the south-western Pacific islands. Druas do not tack but rather shunt (stern becomes the bow and vice versa). Both ends of each hull are identical, but the hulls are of different sizes and the smaller one is always sailed to windward. The main differences, compared to proas, are that the hulls have a symmetric U-form profile, and a second hull is used instead of an outrigger. When a float (cama) is used in place of the smaller hull, the craft is called a camakau.

The Fijian double canoe (wangga ndrua, spelt waqa drua in Fijian) was the largest and finest sea-going vessel ever designed and built by natives of Oceania before contact with Europeans.

— Canoes of Oceania Volume I: The Canoes of Polynesia, Fiji, and Micronesia (1936)

Druas were large, up to 30 metres (98 ft) long, and could carry more than 200 people. Despite being called "canoes", they were not dugouts, but plank-built ships.

== Origins ==
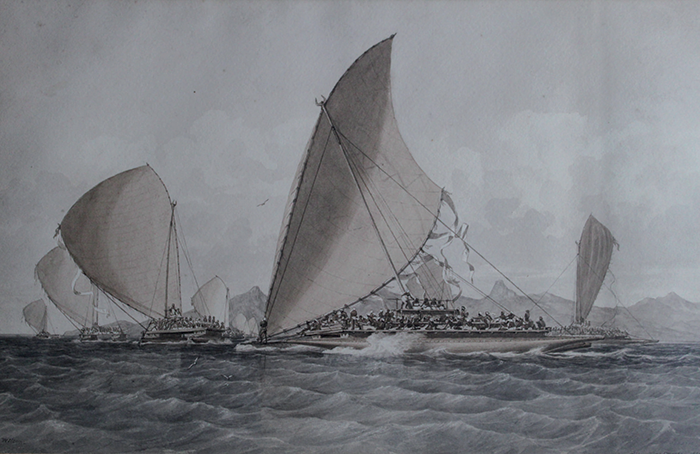
Painting. J. Glen Wilson, 1856. A fleet of drua off the coast of Ovalau Island.

No written record exists of the diffusion of the drua design, but most anthropologists assume its origin in Micronesia, and it probably came to Fiji through the islands of Kiribati and Tuvalu. The only shunting boat type of Polynesian design is the pahi of the Tuamotu archipelago, but it uses equal hulls and does not appear to be related to other proas. From Fiji, druas spread to Tonga (where they are called Kalia) and Samoa (where they are called 'Alia). Captain Cook visited Tonga in his second and third voyages, and noticed that druas were rapidly displacing the Polynesian catamaran design. Tongan chiefs taking part in Fijian wars would bring them back as prizes of war. Drua construction eventually became a monopoly of Tongan shipbuilders living in the Fijian Lau Islands.

== War canoes ==
Druas were sacred canoes in the sense that only aristocrats could own one. Their main role was as war ships, taking part in naval battles and transporting warriors during raids. They also had a representative role, and were used to collect taxes. Following Fijian custom, it was an insult to cross her bows, or to sail to her windward, where the mast stay could be easily cut bringing down the sail. It was also custom to paddle and not to sail in sight of another chief's territory. Launching a drua required a bloody ritual, including human sacrifices.

With regard to the human sacrifice associated with the launching ceremonies, Wilkes in the 19th century records that when the Vunivalu of Bau Tanoa Visawaqa launched a canoe 10 or more men were slaughtered on the deck in order that it might be washed with human blood. Wall (1916) also says:

A new canoe was launched over men's bodies that mana might enter into it and make it swift and safe, but I can find no trace of living men ever having been used for this purpose; they were clubbed first. Certain small islands and districts enjoyed by hereditary right the doubtful honour of supplying the victims for these occasions, as for instance the island of Laucala for the launching of the vessels of the Cakaundrove chiefs.

== Sailing performance ==
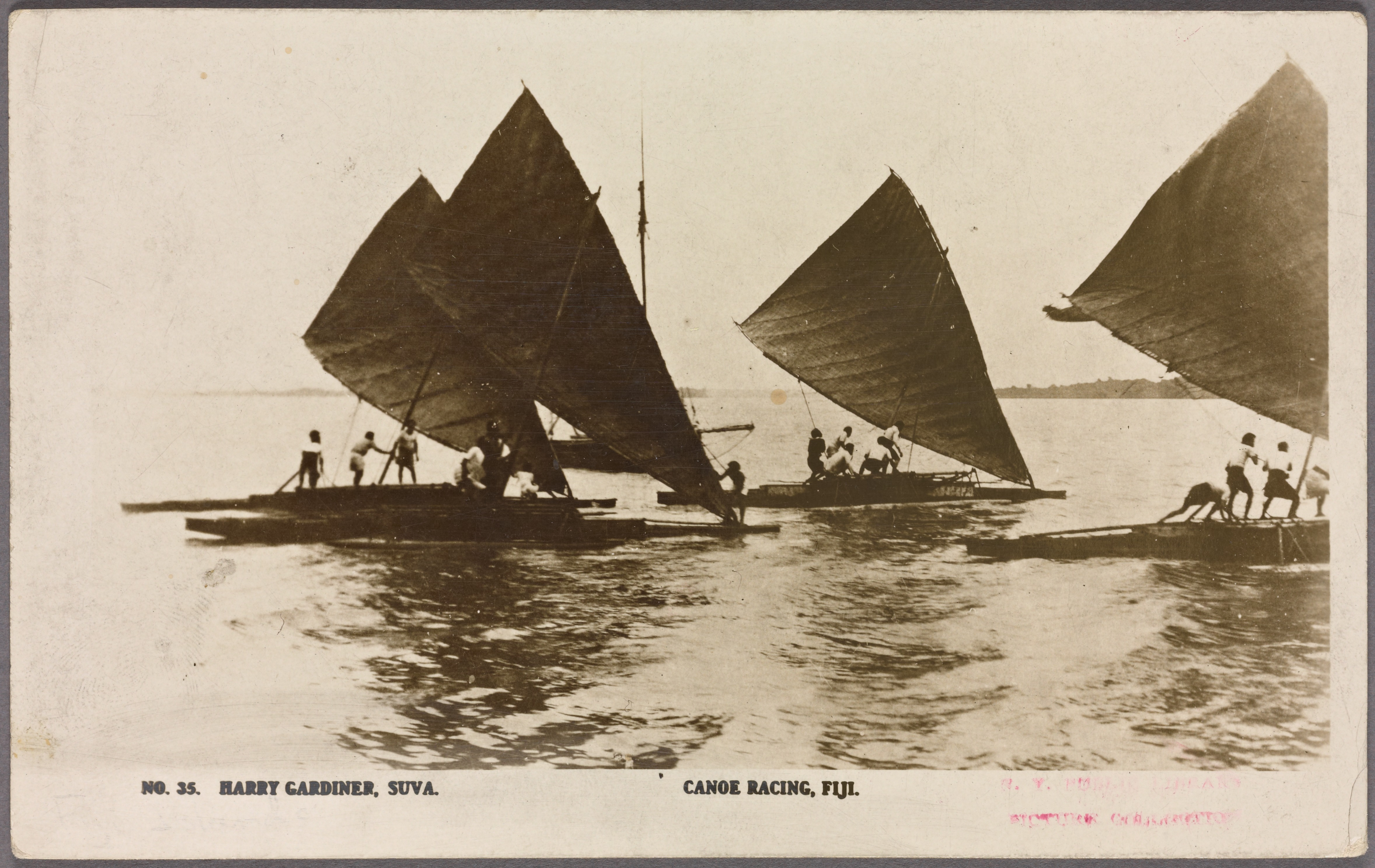
Drua racing in Fiji (c. 1920)

The speed of druas became a legendary topic for western sailors, who sometimes confused "Fijian canoes" with "flying proas" (the latter being the original Micronesian design). The low freeboard of the hulls outside the central platform predates the "wave-piercing" bows of modern racing designs. The one course that could not be sailed, was with the wind directly aft; otherwise her bows would be driven underwater. Her performance upwind is unclear, with some authors claiming it to be fast and close to the wind, and others describing it as making too much leeway with the wind in the quarter. The steering oars were massive, and big canoes would carry one at each end because they were too heavy to transport to the other side while shunting. The steersman (or men) risked being crippled or killed when hitting big waves. The chief used to stand on the platform's top, being responsible for cutting the sheet to avoid capsizing.

== Heritage ==
"The disappearance of the double canoe of Fiji coincided with the close of the nineteenth century. Few if any were constructed after 1883, the year of the death of King Cakobau, for his grandson, Ratu Popi, informed me that the king's sons two or three years later broke his double canoes to pieces and buried them in a swamp that they may be preserved and kept from being used by anyone else"

According to some sources, the last Fijian ndrua was built in 1943 on the island of Ongea and was intended to carry copra.

Only two original druas appear to have survived, both of them small. One, named Sema Makawa, is in the New Zealand Maritime Museum. The second one is Ratu Finau, at the Fiji Museum in Suva. A new Drua, the i Vola Sigavou, was completed in 2016 and launched at Navua in Serua province on Viti Levu Fiji's main island.

Today, drua are still a symbol of Fiji, and Fiji's telephone booths are decorated with the characteristic mast-tops of drua.

== See also ==
- List of multihulls
