= Baurua =

Traditional sailing proa of the Gilbert Islands

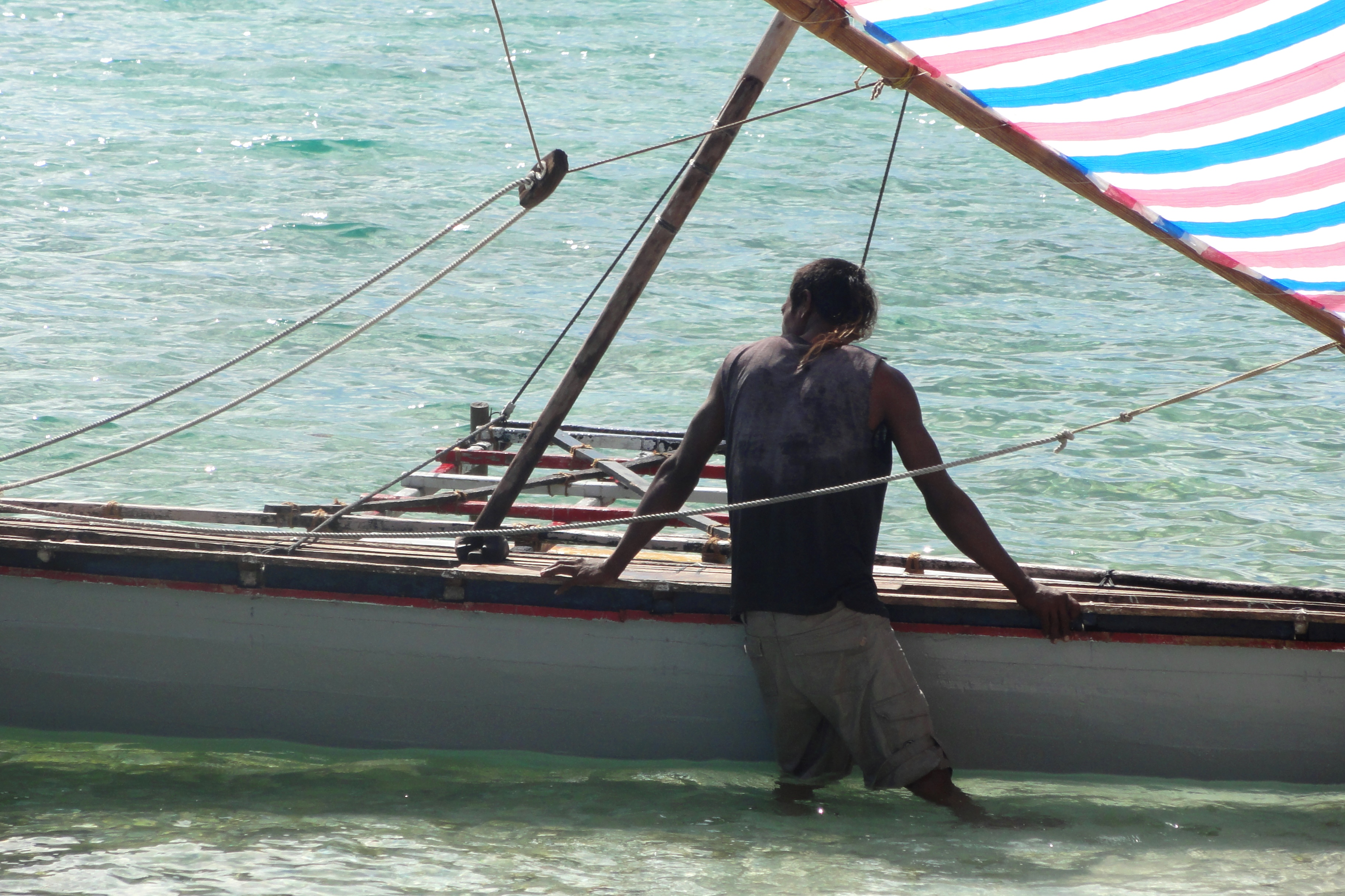
Getting ready to set sail in Terio, Kiribati, 2011.

The baurua was a traditional sailing proa of the Gilbert Islands. They were used for the transport of people to different islands or local produce to urban areas. They are considered to have been the most sophisticated of the Austronesian sailing vessels. A 100-foot baurua was built in 1939.

== See also ==
- List of multihulls
- Wa (watercraft)
