= Pahi (ship) =

Type of traditional Tahitian watercraft

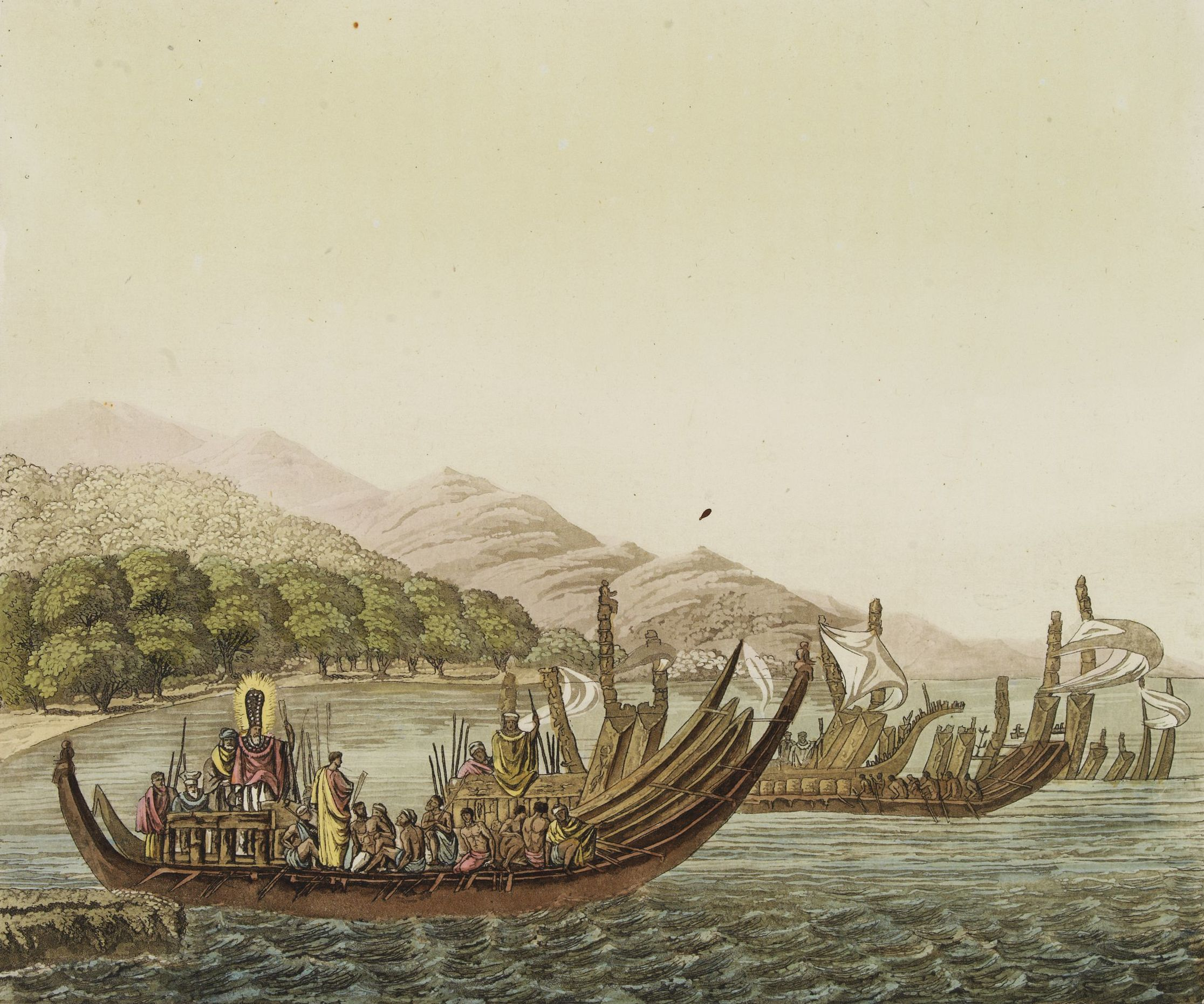
1827 depiction of Tahitian pahi double-hulled war canoes

Pahi were the traditional double-hulled sailing watercraft of Tahiti. They were large, two masted, and rigged with crab claw sails. Able to carry 4-16 men and 17–25 metres (56–82 ft) long, these were big Polynesian ships.
