= Outrigger =

Projecting structure on a boat

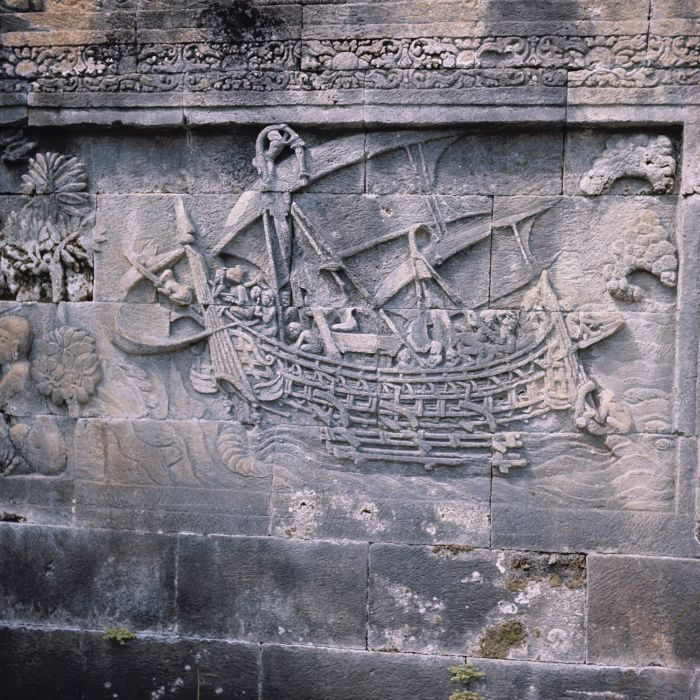
Relief of Borobudur Temple (8th century AD) in Central Java, Indonesia, showing a ship with outrigger

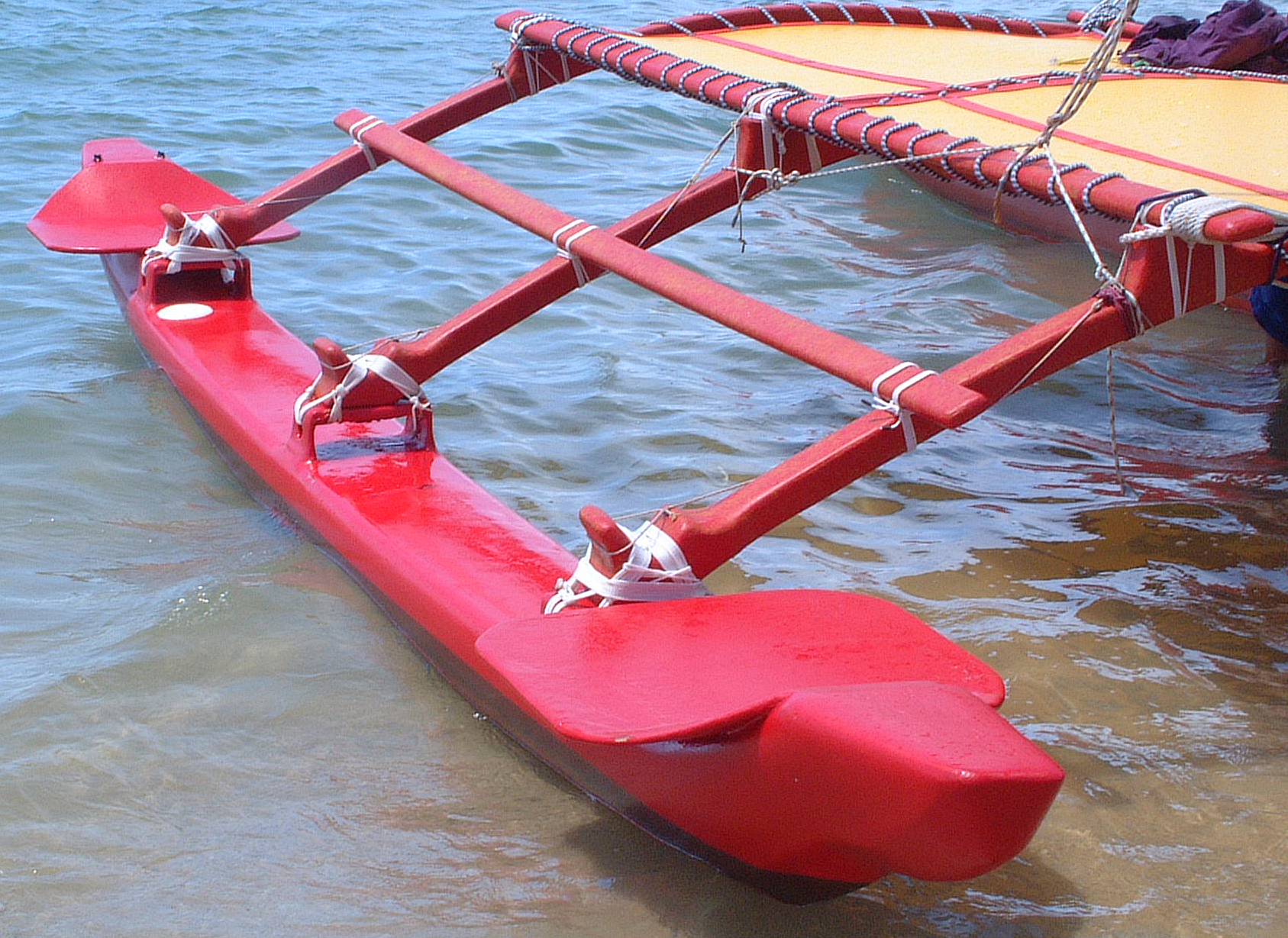
Outrigger on a contemporary Hawaiian sailing canoe

An outrigger is a projecting structure on a boat, with specific meaning depending on types of vessel. Outriggers may also refer to legs on a wheeled vehicle that are folded out when it needs stabilization, for example on a crane that lifts heavy loads.

== Powered vessels and sailboats ==
An outrigger describes any contraposing float rigging beyond the side (gunwale) of a boat to improve the vessel's stability. If a single outrigger is used it is usually but not always windward. The technology was originally developed by the Austronesian people. There are two main types of boats with outriggers: double outriggers (prevalent in maritime Southeast Asia) and single outriggers (prevalent in Madagascar, Melanesia, Micronesia and Polynesia). Multihull ships are also derived from outrigger boats.

In an outrigger canoe and in sailboats such as the proa, an outrigger is a thin, long, solid, hull used to stabilise an inherently unstable main hull. The outrigger is positioned rigidly and parallel to the main hull so that the main hull is less likely to capsize. If only one outrigger is used on a vessel, its weight reduces the tendency to capsize in one direction and its buoyancy reduces the tendency in the other direction.

On a keelboat, "outrigger" refers to a variety of structures by which the running rigging (such as a sheet) may be attached outboard (outside the lateral limits) of the boat's hull. The Racing Rules of Sailing generally prohibit such outriggers, though they are explicitly permitted on specific classes, such as the IMOCA Open 60 used in several major offshore races.

== Fishing ==
In fishing from vessels, an outrigger is a pole or series of adjustable poles that allow boats to trawl more lines in the water without tangling and simulates a school of fish. It is attached to the fishing boat's sides in front of the hull. They are typically made from metal or plastic and provide stability for the fishing boat and fishing platform.

== Rowing ==
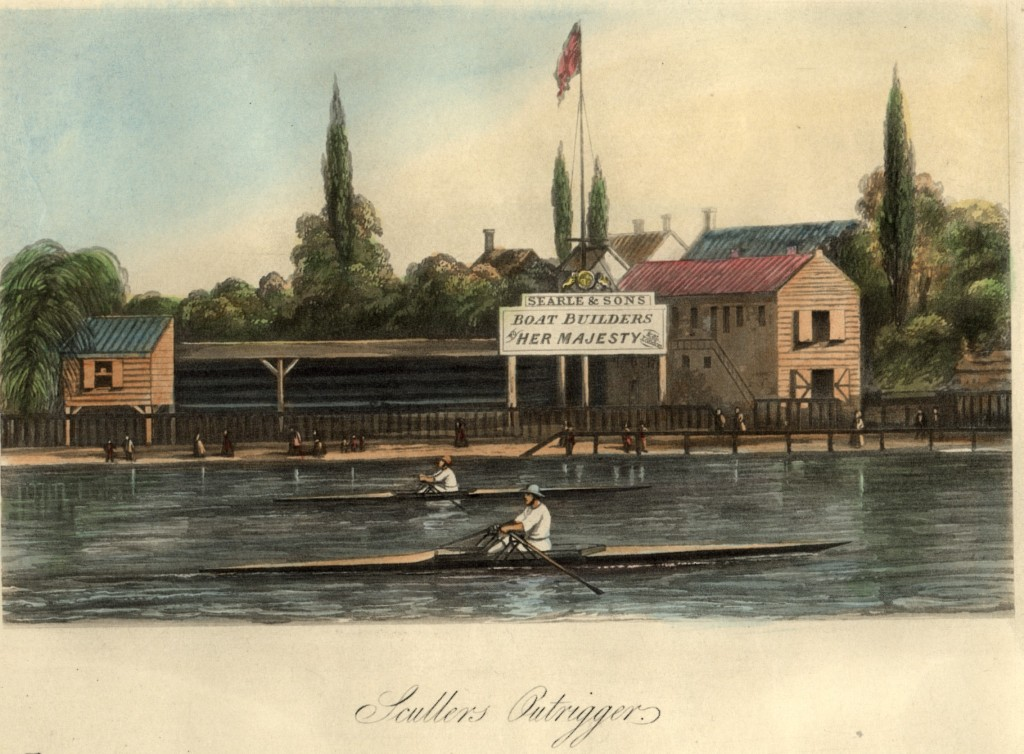
Early racing sculls with outriggers in 1851.

In a rowing boat or galley, an outrigger (or rigger) is a triangular frame that holds the rowlock (into which the oar is slotted) away from the saxboard (or gunwale in gig rowing) to optimize leverage. Wooden outriggers appear on the new trireme around the 7th or 6th centuries BC and later on Italian galleys around AD 1300, while Harry Clasper (1812–1870), a British professional rower, popularised the use of the modern tubular-metal version and the top rowing events accepted the physiological and ergonomic advantages so acceded to its use in competitions. In recent decades, some manufacturers of racing shells have developed wing-riggers which are reinforced arcs or flattened tubular projections akin to aircraft wings, instead of conventional triangular structures.

== See also ==
- Outrigger canoe
- Catamaran
- Outrigger canoe racing
- Racing shell
- Sailing canoe
- Training wheels
