= Armadahan =

Type of boat

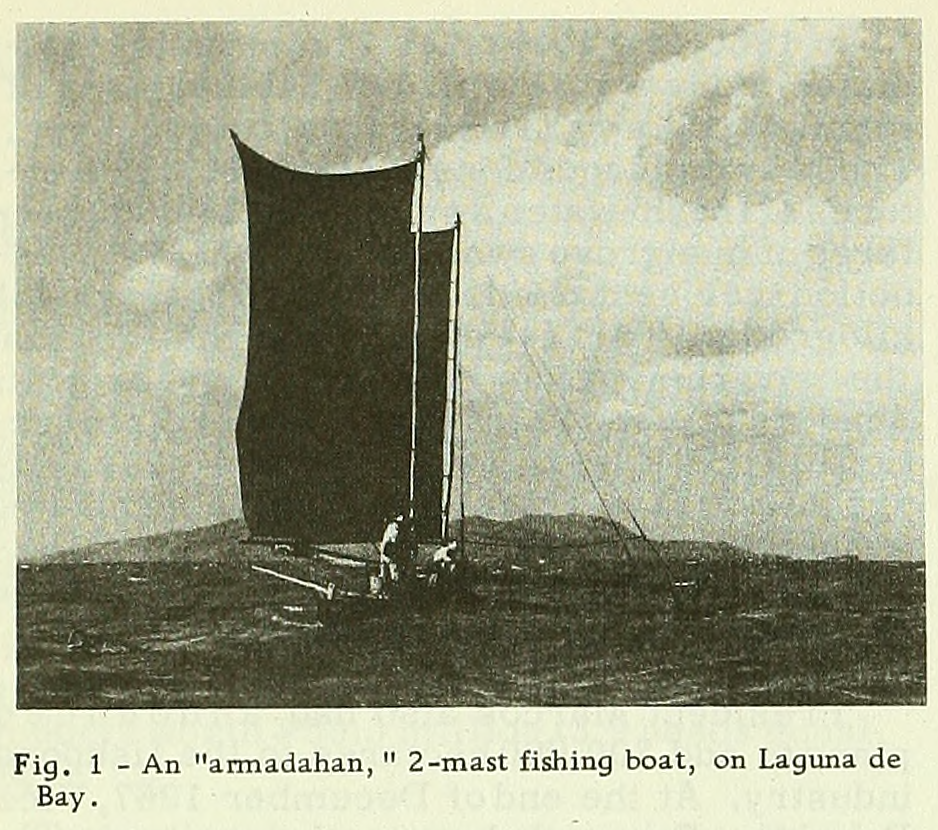
An armadahan in Laguna de Bay (1968)

Armadahan, or armada, is a traditional two-masted single-outrigger fishing boat from Laguna de Bay lake in the Philippines. It is a type of bangka.

== Description ==
Armadahan were dugouts typically 10 to 12 m (33 to 39 ft) long and 1 to 1.3 m (3.3 to 4.3 ft) wide. They were equipped with two masts, at the middle and the front middle of the boat, which were rigged with either crab claw sails or two square spritsails. It has an open deck with a flooring made of removable sections of bamboo or wooden slats.

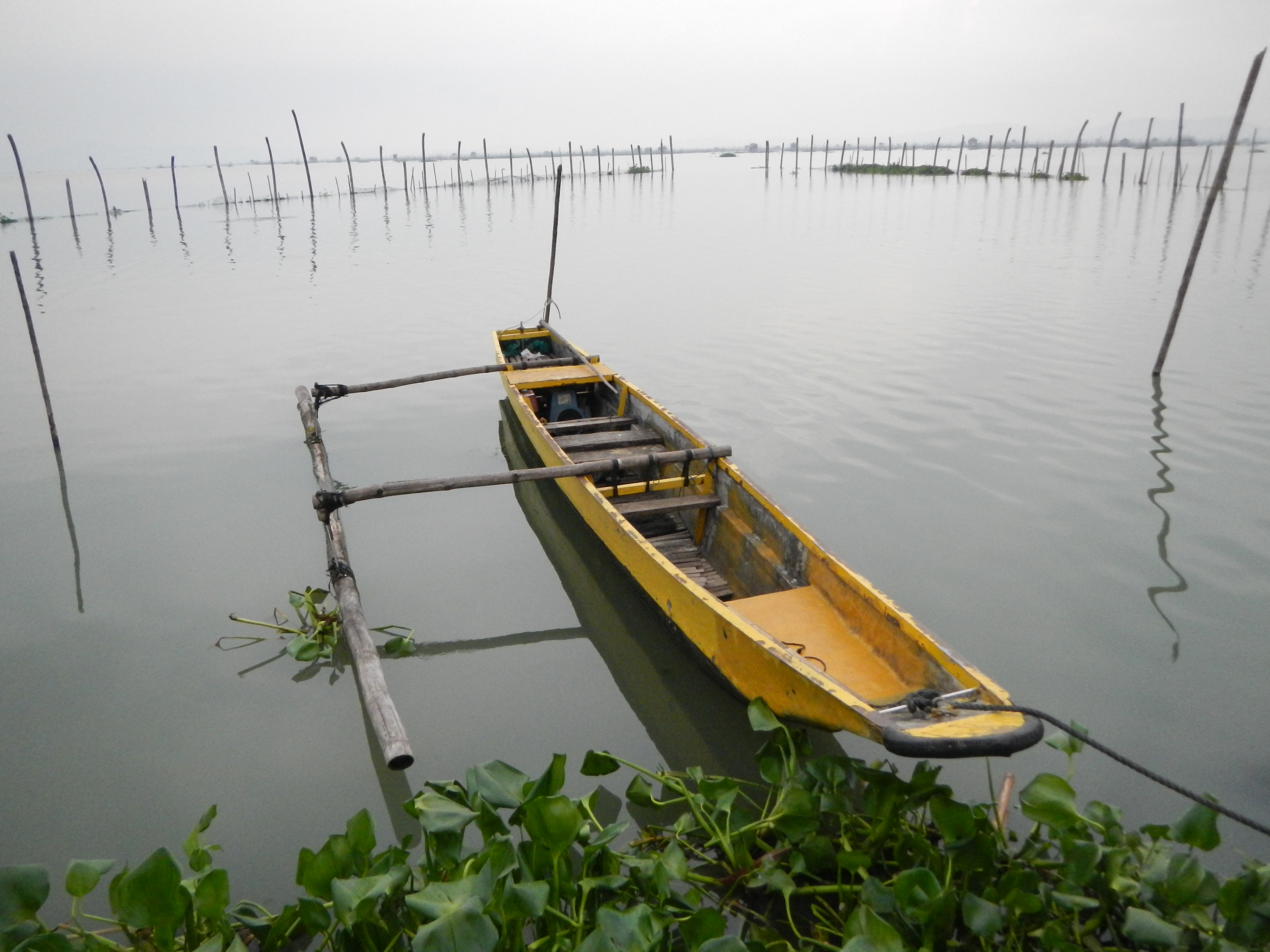
A modern motorized descendant of the armadahan in Laguna de Bay

The single outrigger float (palangoy) on the starboard side was either two bamboo poles lashed together or a flattened elongated beam. It was connected to the hull by a length of bamboo around 6 m (20 ft) long, known as the batangan. It also featured a counter-balance beam projecting off the port side known as the paltek. The batangan is connected to the hull by a wooden outrigger beam collar, with braces on the forward, cross, and aft.

At the stern is a small socket for the rudder tiller. Three or four other small holes are also drilled along the midcenter of the dugout to let the water enter the craft, allowing live fish to be stored in the hull when fishing. These holes are also used to drain the craft when beached. Each boat also has a cooking area on the aft, usually a wood or kerosene portable stove.

In modern times, these types of boats are usually motorized or paddled.

== Armadahan Regatta ==
Armadahan were formerly part of an annual regatta held on the first week of March in Cardona, Rizal. The regatta sailed across Laguna de Bay to the small island of Cielito Lindo (also known as the "Toothbrush Island"), owned by the prominent Bello family, which used to feature a pier, a small chapel, and a reception center. The regatta ceased to be celebrated when Laguna de Bay became too crowded with fish pens to navigate. The facilities on Cielito Lindo have also fallen into disrepair due to typhoons.

== See also ==
- Balacion
- Casco (barge)
- Guilalo
- Salambaw
