= David Scott Cowper =

British yachtsman

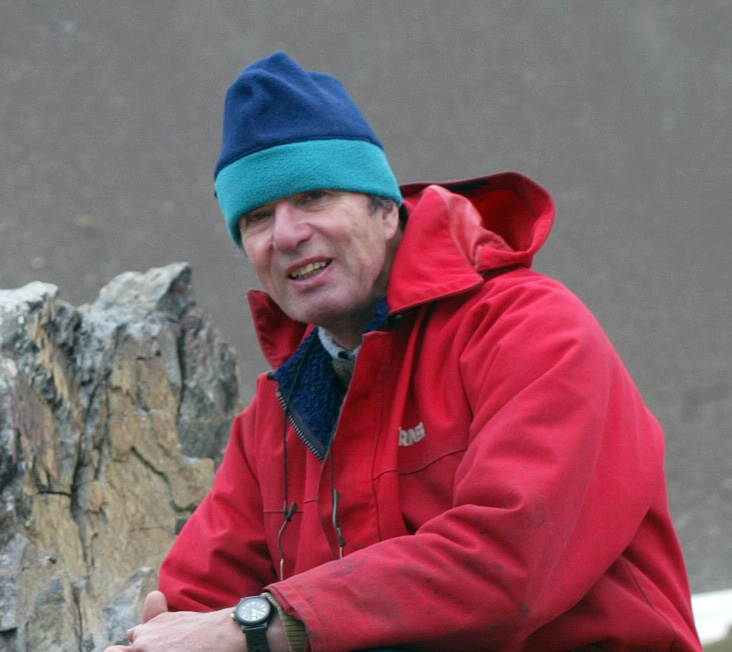
- David Scott Cowper at Stromness, South Georgia in 2003; Photo: David Scott Cowper
- Born: 1 March 1942 (age 84); Newcastle upon Tyne, England
- Occupation: Chartered Building Surveyor
- Known for: Yachtsman, circumnavigator

David Scott Cowper is a British yachtsman, and was the first man to sail solo round the world in both directions and was also the first to successfully sail around the world via the Northwest Passage single-handed.

== Biography ==
Born in 1942, David Cowper was educated at Stowe School and lives and works in Newcastle upon Tyne. Although he is a Chartered Building Surveyor and a Fellow of the Royal Institution of Chartered Surveyors, sailing was his passion from an early age.

In 1974, Cowper participated and successfully completed The Observer Around Britain Race in his Wanderer-class sailboat, Airedale, L.O.A. 29' 6", designed by John Laurent Giles. In 1976, he successfully completed The Observer Single-Handed Trans-Atlantic Race, again in his boat Airedale.

In 1980, Cowper completed the fastest solo circumnavigation of the globe via Cape Horn, Cape of Good Hope and Cape Leeuwin in Ocean Bound, a W. Huisman 41 ft sloop designed by Sparkman & Stephens, beating Francis Chichester's 53 ft Gypsy Moth IV, record of 226 days by one day.

Two years later, he repeated the feat, sailing against the prevailing westerly winds and rounding all five capes in 237 days, beating Chay Blyth's 59' British Steel record by 72 days and becoming the first person to circumnavigate Cape Horn in both directions single-handed and also holds the record for the fastest single handed time in each direction.

In 1980, the city of Newcastle, celebrating its 900th anniversary, recognized his feats and awarded him honorary Freedom of the City.

Cowper then switched to motorboats, and in 1984–1985 he sailed westwards round the globe in a converted ex-Royal National Lifeboat Institution Watson 42-foot wooden lifeboat, the Mabel E. Holland, via the Panama Canal, becoming the first person to circumnavigate solo in a motor boat.

These feats served as a prelude to the first solo circumnavigation via the Northwest Passage, which consumed four years two months and ended in 1990. On 14 July 1986, he departed from Newcastle to make his way across the North Atlantic up the west coast of Greenland to enter Lancaster Sound, eventually reaching Fort Ross at the east end of Bellot Strait. Due to heavy pack ice and the start of an early winter, Mabel E. Holland remained in the ice for two full years at this location. When Cowper returned the next summer, he found the boat waterlogged, and spent the short summer pulling her ashore and repairing her. In 1988, he managed to reach Alaska having left the boat at Inuvik, Northwest Territories on the Mackenzie River, before one of the coldest winters in recorded Arctic history.

On the tenth of August 1989, he sailed into the Bering Strait, becoming the first person to have completed the passage single-handed as part of a circumnavigation of the world. Continuing via Midway and Papua New Guinea, he reached Darwin, Northern Territory on the Australian coast just before the start of the hurricane season where he laid up his boat. Returning in April 1990, he continued via the Cape of Good Hope, arriving back in Newcastle on 24 September.

Subsequently, Cowper attempted to complete the Northern Sea Route (North East Passage) over the top of Russia. He had an aluminium boat, 14.6m Polar Bound, built and took it round Cape Horn and up the west coast of the Americas in 2002, but was refused permission by the Russian authorities. He turned east and completed the Northwest Passage again, in two summers, from west to east, becoming the first person to have completed an east to west and west to east single-handed transit. He then prepared Polar Bound for another attempt, should permission be given by Russia.

== 2009–2010 ==
In August 2009, Cowper began what was to be his 6th circumnavigation of the earth. The journey was planned to last fifteen months and cover 35,000 mi (56,000 km). Starting at Maryport in Cumbria, England, the intended route is to sail to Greenland and then through the Northwest Passage and the Bering Strait. On 6 September 2009, he was docked in Cambridge Bay, halfway through the Northwest Passage, and on 24 September he sailed into Dutch Harbor in the Aleutians, after completing the passage single-handed for the third time. David Cowper is the only person to have done the Northwest Passage three times and he did it solo in a single season in 2009. In 1979–82, Kenichi Horie in Mermaid, was the first person to do it solo, but took two overwintering stops. Two other individuals, Arved Fuchs and Oliver Pitras, have done it twice as part of a crew.

Cowper left Dutch Harbor on 29 September 2009 and sailed into the St. Francis Yacht Club in San Francisco on 14 October. He left the Sausalito Yacht Club on 28 October, heading south for Chile and Antarctica. He would then make his way to the Falkland Islands, South Georgia Island (where he was sighted on 21 April 2010), Tristan da Cunha and Cape Town. From there the intended route is to South Australia, then across the Pacific Ocean to Fiji, Hawaii, Dutch Harbor and then through the Northwest Passage back to England. According to The Daily Telegraph, this "will be the first circumnavigation involving a double-transit of the Passage."

== 2011 ==
On 5 October 2011, 0900 UTC, MV Polar Bound arrived at Whitehaven UK completing his sixth solo circumnavigation and fourth Northwest Passage transit.

When Polar Bound called at Honolulu for a brief refueling stop in June 2011, before continuing up to Dutch Harbor in the Aleutians, agents for NASA were trying to find a vessel which would undertake a 900-mile journey out into the Pacific to try to locate a $2.5 million prototype beacon that had developed a fault, that they wanted retrieved.

This task required extreme accuracy in navigation as the only part of the beacon visible was its slender antenna measuring approximately 18 inches high, colored black with a diameter of approximately 10mm.

Polar Bound was given the task and an approximate location of the beacon. After setting out NASA would bring the beacon to the surface to obtain an accurate position. It was necessary for Polar Bound to reach that position within 48 hours before the batteries giving out the position died.

It took Polar Bound 6 days to reach the location and at that time there was approximately 15 knots of wind blowing with a 4 – 5 ft swell running. Four hours were spent in the location looking for the beacon and it was spotted in a breaking wave which showed the body of the beacon from a distance of approximately 20 yards. Polar Bound was then put alongside the beacon and a sling attached. The beacon was then brought on board, stored on the aft deck and taken to Dutch Harbor where it was duly collected by Yi Chao and Thomas Valdez who were the innovators and designers of the beacon.

The dimensions of the beacon were 97 inches length, circumference 37 inches and weight 200 lbs.

== 2012 ==
At 15.33Z on 29 August 2012, David Scott Cowper and Jane Maufe (four-times great niece of Arctic explorer Rear-Admiral Sir John Franklin) aboard motor yacht Polar Bound, became the first yacht to navigate west of Cape Prince Alfred on the original Northwest Passage through McClure Strait discovered by Captain Robert McClure aboard HMS Investigator in 1851. Polar Bound departed Portrush, Northern Ireland on Thursday 2 August 2012 at 1030 UTC and arrived at the port of Nome Alaska on Friday 7 September 2012 at 1800 UTC completing an official Northwest Passage by crossing both the Atlantic Arctic Circle 17 August at approximately 1000 UTC @ 66.31 N 54.20 W and crossed the Pacific Arctic Circle Thursday 6 September at approximately 0640 UTC at 66.31 M 167.59 W. This northwest passage was just under 20 days transit. Following this passage, Cowper was awarded the Blue Water Medal of the Cruising Club of America.

Cowper has completed 5 official Northwest Passages (four solo single handed and one with crew) passing through the Atlantic Arctic Circle and the Pacific Arctic Circles; in 1986 aboard M/V Mable E Holland, in 2001, 2009, 2011 & 2012 aboard M/V Polar Bound.

== 2016 ==
Aboard MV Polar Bound, David Scott Cowper and his son, Freddie Cowper, became the first to complete the Northwest Passage via Route-7 West, (Note: Route-7 East of the Northwest Passage had been completed multiple times before this: by RV Pandora II and RV Theta in 1970, and by the Russian Icebreaker Kapitan Khlebnikov in 2006.) navigating through Fury and Hecla Strait.

Transit details:

Depart Julianehab Greenland: 2016.08.17
Crossed the Atlantic Arctic Circle in Foxe Basin: 2016.08.25-0544 hrs.
Transit Labrador Narrows in Fury & Hecla Strait: 2016.08.26-1758 hrs.
Crossed Bellot Narrows west: 2016.09.03
Crossed Pt. Barrow Alaska west in 4-6/10 sea ice: 2016.09.20-1700 hrs.
Crossed the Pacific Arctic Circle in Bering Strait: 2016.09.23-1804 hrs.
Arrived Port of Nome Alaska: 2016.09.24
Route-7 West distance navigated: 2,638 nautical miles
Elapsed time en route Arctic Circle to Arctic Circle: 29 days 12:18 hrs.

== Photos ==
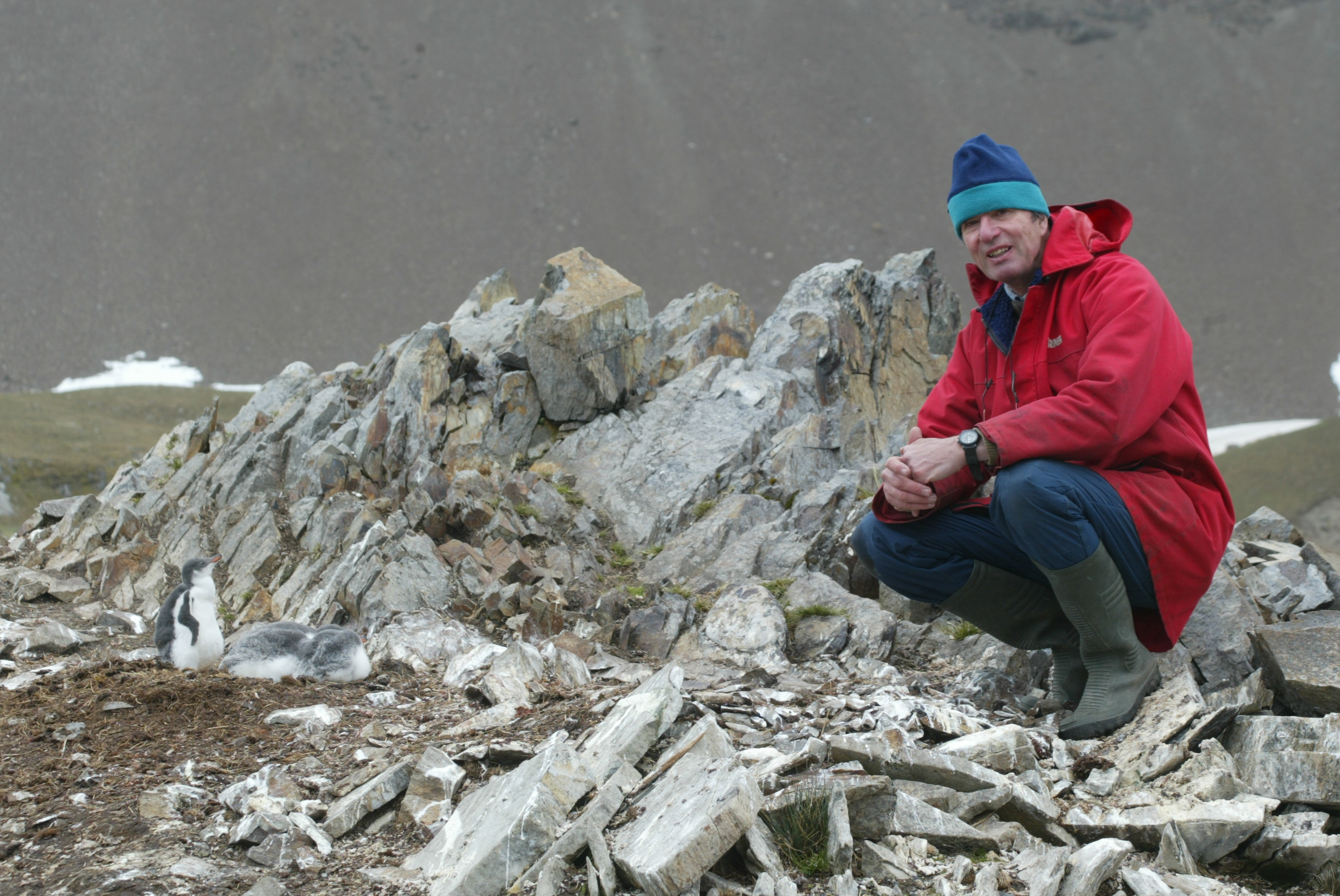
Cowper at Stromness, South Georgia (2003)

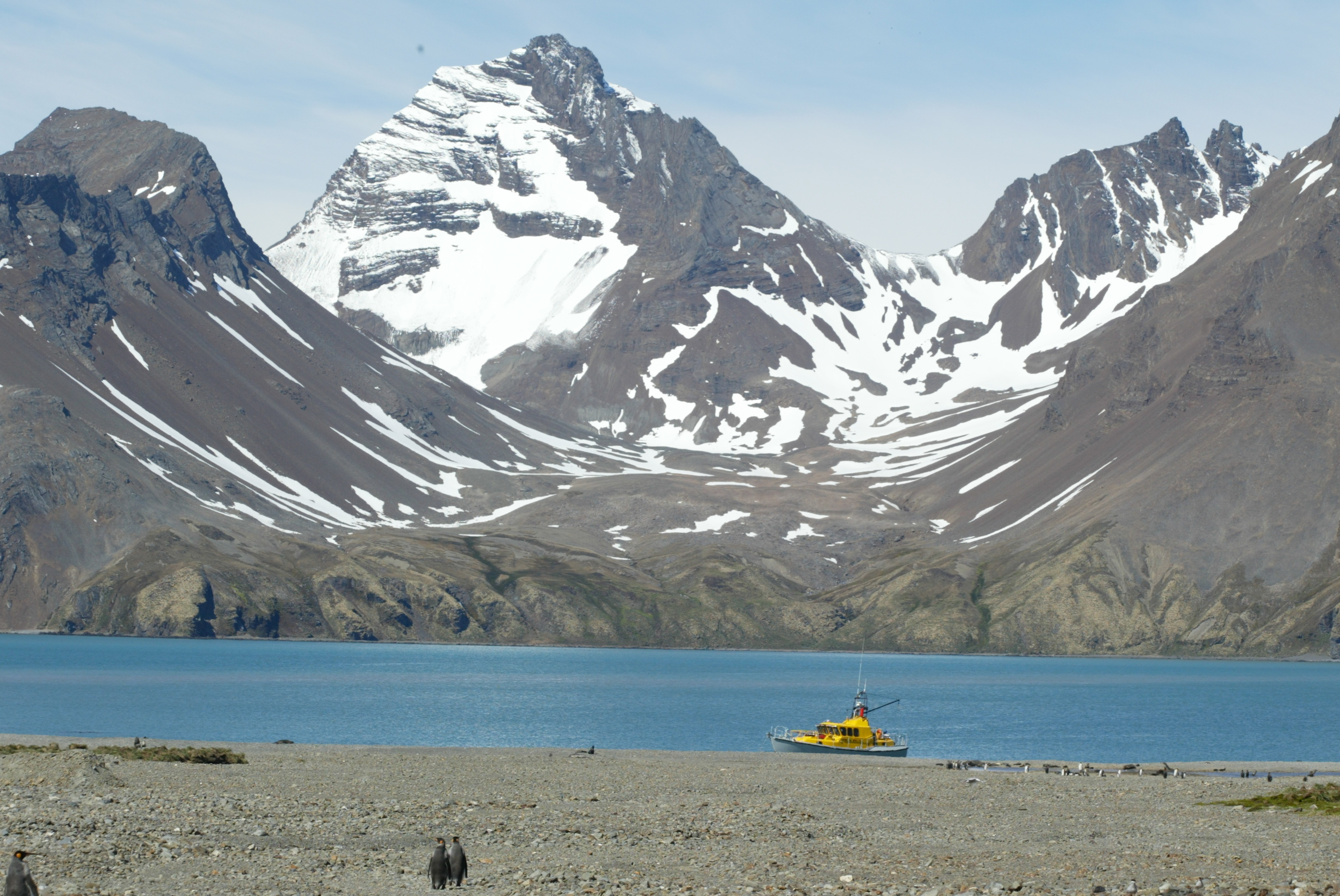
Polar Bound at Fortuna Bay, South Georgia (2003)

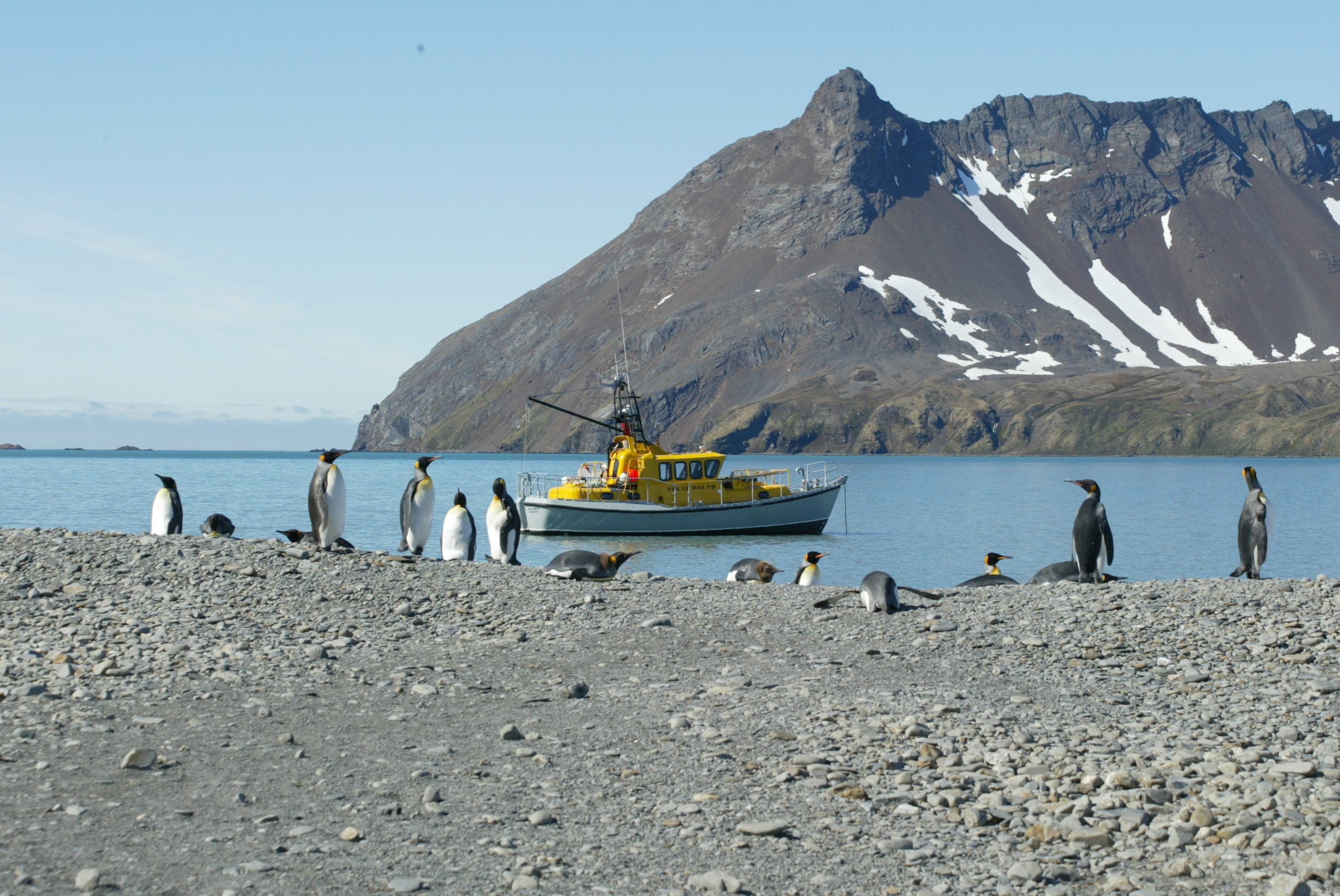
Polar Bound at Fortuna Bay, South Georgia (2003)

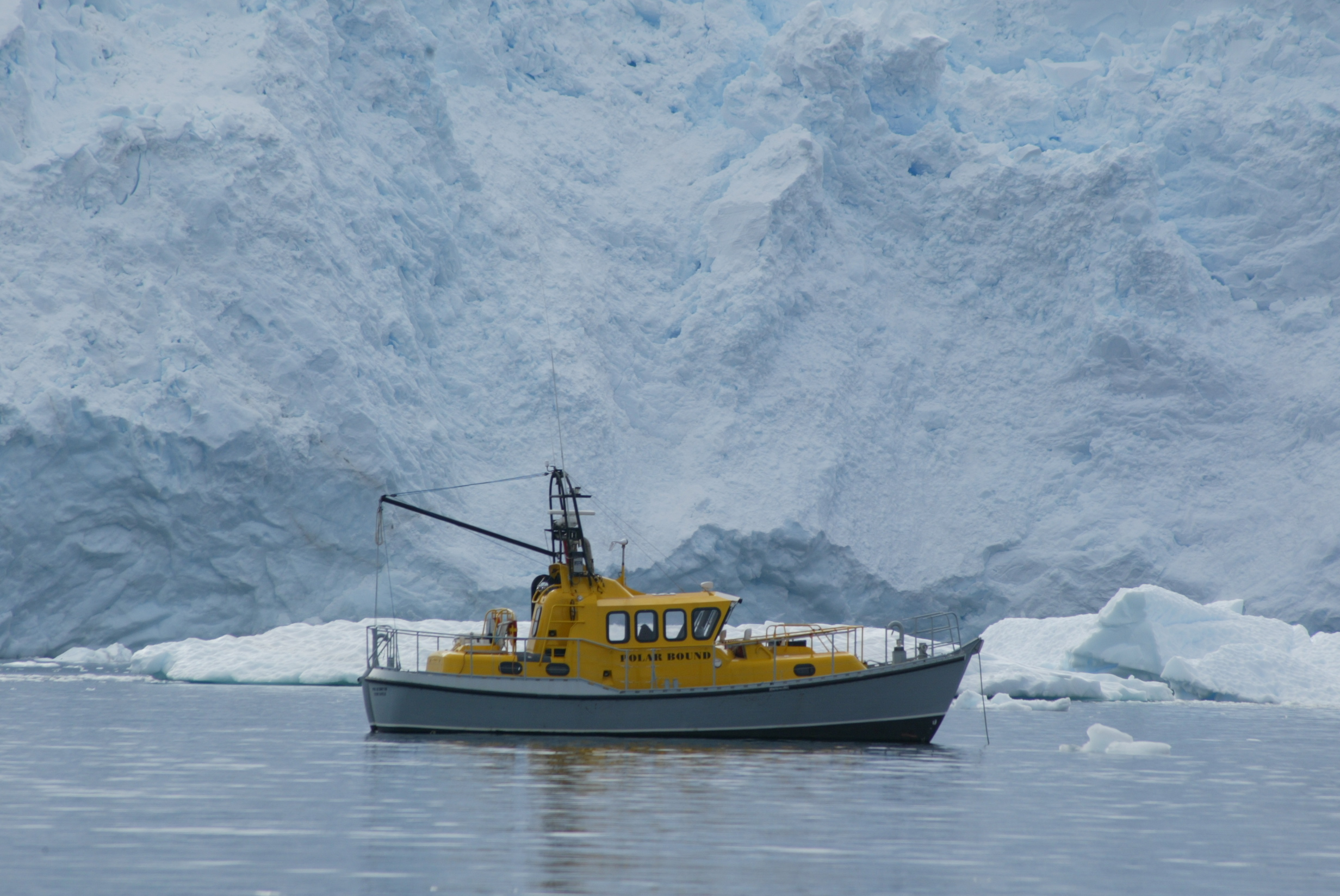
Polar Bound at Port Lockroy, Antarctica (2003)

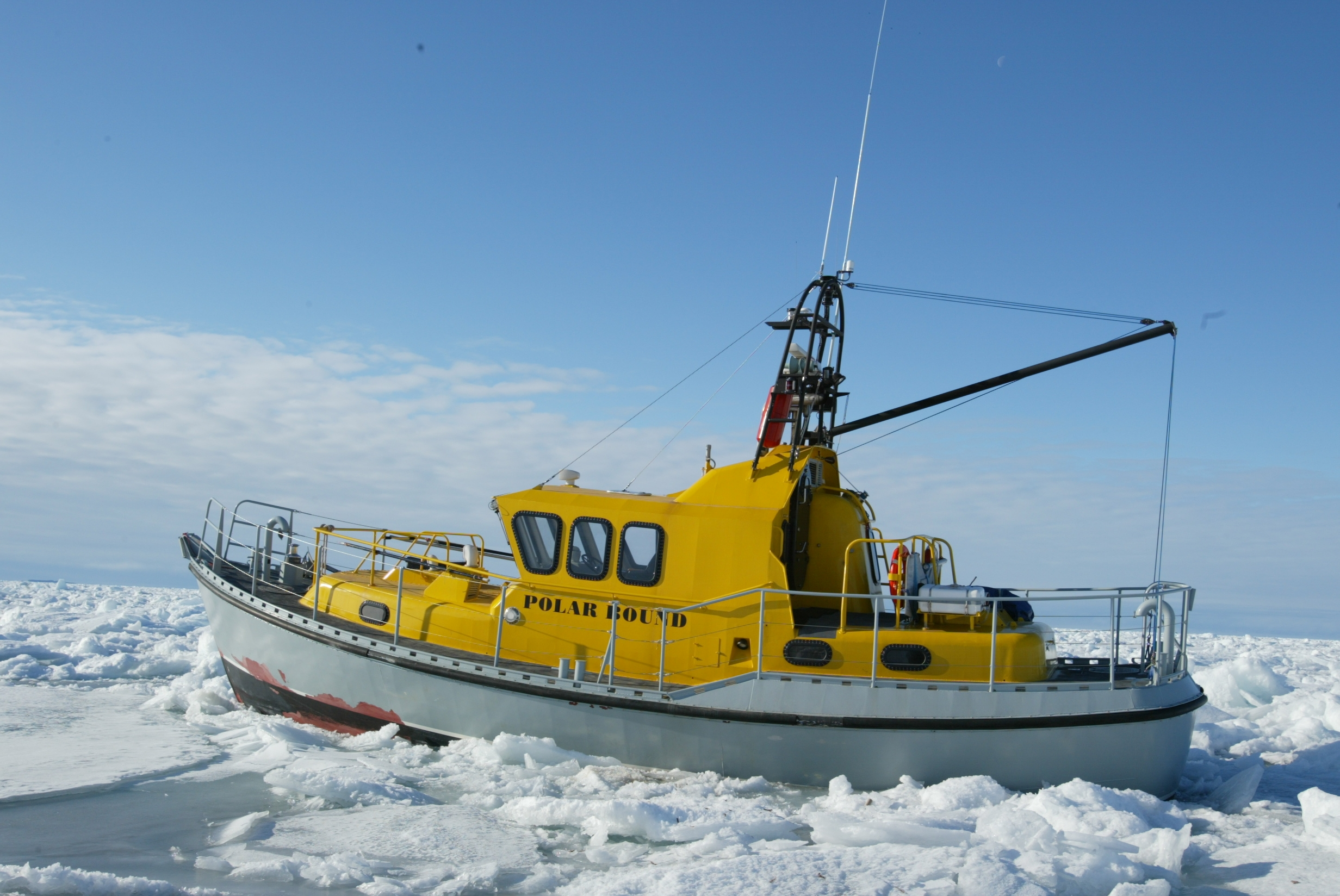
Polar Bound in Franklin Strait during a 2004 Northwest Passage

== Sources ==
- Cowper, David Scott. Northwest Passage Solo. UK: Seafarer Books 1993. ISBN 978-0-85036-429-3
- Power and Motor Yacht article
- Profile
- Mabel E. Holland iced in at Fort Ross 86/88 with tent and skidoo alongside
- Mabel E. Holland attempting to make progress in Lancaster Sound through pack ice in 1986
- Mabel E. Holland attempting to make progress in Lancaster Sound through pack ice in 1986
- An indication of height, of heavy polar pack ice encountered off Barter Island alongside the bows of Mabel E. Holland
- Retrieval of NASA's Beacon from water in 2011
- David Scott Cowper (height 6'1") standing next to NASA Beacon
- Yi Chao & Thomas Valdez from NASA, Innovators and Designers from Jet Propulsion Laboratory
- David Scott Cowper in his extensive reference office
