= Blue Water Medal =

Annual award for a remarkable sailing feat

The Blue Water Medal is an honor awarded annually by the Cruising Club of America for a remarkable sailing feat. The first award was issued in 1923.

== Winners ==
- Kenichi Horie (2022)
- Ginger and Peter Niemann (2021)
- Randall Reeves (2020)
- Jean-Luc Van Den Heede (2019)
- Bruce Halabisky and Tiffany Loney (2018)
- Webb Chiles (2017)
- Michael J Johnson (2016)
- Tom and Vicky Jackson (2015)
- Skip Novak (2014)
- Jeanne Socrates (2013)
- David Scott Cowper (2012)
- Thies Matzen and Kicki Ericson (2011) on Wanderer III "for 24 years and 135,000 miles of sailing the oceans of the world with a focus in the high latitudes of the Southern Ocean". This is the second Blue Water Medal earned by the Wanderer III, the first being with Eric and Susan Hiscock who made two circumnavigations with her and received the Blue Water Medal in 1955.
- Alex Whitworth (2010) "for a circumnavigation of the world via the Northwest Passage west to east."
- Annie Hill and Trevor Robertson (2009)
- Peter Passano (2007)
- Minoru Saito (2006)
- Anthony Gooch (2003) "For his very well planned and executed single-handed nonstop circumnavigation from Victoria to Victoria, British Columbia. His 177-day voyage began in late 2002 in his 42 foot cutter, Taonui and was completed in 2003. Prior to that, he and his wife, Coryn, had sailed about 115,000 miles over most of the world."
- Nikolay Litau (2001) "For his circumnavigation of Europe, Africa, Australia, and Asia. He departed St. Petersburg, Nov. 1996, spent a winter laid up on the NE coast of Siberia, made it through the Bering Strait, where ice forced him to lay up again in Tiksy (Northern Siberia). In Aug. 1999, he made it through the Northeast Passage, a first in history. After 30,905 miles, he finally returned to St. Petersburg in November."
- Eric Forsyth (2000) "For a remarkable voyage in his 42-foot sloop to Antarctica from Patchogue, Long Island, via Panama Canal, Galapagos, Chile, Port Lockroy on the Antarctic Peninsula, SouthGeorgia Island, Cape Town, and home by way of St. Martin and Bermuda. 21,784 miles,10 months with crew of 1 or 2 young men. Wrote copious descriptions of his cruise, and produced special guide to the Patagonian passages."
- Jerome and Sally Poncet (1992) for 12 years of cruising in the Antarctic and their publication of a handbook on preservation of the region.
- Gerry Clark (1987)
- Thomas Watson Jr. (1986)
- Marvin C. Creamer (1985)
- Rolph Bjelke (sic) and Deborah Shapiro (1984) "For a cruise of 33,000 miles including both Arctic ice and Antarctic ice in a forty foot ketch with essentially zero material casualties."
- Willi de Roos (1980)
- William Donald Aelian King (1975)
- Miles and Beryl Smeeton (1973)
- Bob, Nancy, and Reid Griffith (1972) "Since 1959 this family has cruised over 170,000 miles. Notable voyages include the first Antarctic circumnavigation, the first windward (east to west) circumnavigation south of all continents, and a circumnavigation via the canals."
- Hal Roth (1971) Awarded for his cruise of 18,538 miles around the Pacific Basin, with his wife as crew, aboard a 35-foot sloop "Whisper"
- Richard S. Nye (1970) "For meritorious cruising and ocean racing" sailing his boat "Carina" described as "a sleek, black-hulled 48-foot sloop from Greenwich, Connecticut."
- Frank Casper (1970) Extended singlehanded cruising including one circumnavigation and numerous trans-Atlantic passages aboard "Elsie"
- Éric Tabarly (1964) Winner of the second single race across the Atlantic from Plymouth, England to Newport, R. I. aboard "Pen-Duick III" in 27 days, 1 hour, 56 minutes.
- Charles W. Atwater (1937) "A voyage from New York to Reykjavik, Iceland and return to Newport via Trepassey, Newfoundland, June 19-August 26, 1937. A 37 1/2-foot oa. Mower cutter."
- Charles Foster Tillinghast (1935) "For his seamanship in the effort to save three members of the crew of the Hamrah who were overboard in the North Atlantic, and in bringing the disabled and short-handed ketch safely into Sydney, N.S."
- Roderick Stephens Jr. (1933) for a "three-month, 8,000-mile trans-Atlantic crossing from New York to Norway and return, including victory in the Fastnet Race. The 52-foot 3-inch Stephens-designed yawl returned home from England by the northern route in the remarkable time of 26 days."
- Robert Somerset (1932) Award was given for his remarkable feat of seamanship and courage, aboard his vessel "Jolie Brise", rescuing all but one of 11-man crew of burning schooner Adriana in the 1932 Bermuda Race
- William A. Robinson (1931) In his 32-foot 9-inch "Svapp" Alden ketch departed New London June 23, 1928, in the Bermuda Race of that year, and circumnavigated via Panama and Suez Canals with crew of two, arriving in N.Y. November 24, 1931
- Frederick Lothrop Ames Jr. (1927) Ames sailed his 50-foot "Primrose IV" Alden schooner to England for the 1926 Fastnet. The medal was awarded for the return passage, from Portsmouth, north about, Iceland, Labrador, Cape Breton Island, in 58 days to Newport, R.I.
- Harry Clifford Pidgeon on Islander (1926) for having the "first circumnavigation-from Los Angeles to Los Angeles via Cape and Panama Canal, November 18, 1921–October 31, 1925. Home-built a 34-foot yawl of Sea Bird type. Single-handed."
- Evelyn George Martin (1925)
- Axel Ingwersen (1924) for his trip where he "departed Shanghai February 20, 1923 and arrived Denmark via Cape of Good Hope in May, 1924. Double-ended ketch, 47 feet oa., built by native laborers. Crew of three."
- Alain J. Gerbault on Firecrest (1923) for leaving Gibraltar on June 7, 1923, and arriving at Fort Totten, New York, 100 days later, nonstop in his Dixon Kemp designed British cutter, 34 feet length overall, single-handed.
