= Hal Roth =

American sailor

- Born: 1927; Cleveland, Ohio, United States
- Died: October 18, 2008 (aged 80–81); Easton, Maryland, United States
- Resting place: Pacific Ocean
- Education: Journalism
- Alma mater: University of California, Berkeley
- Occupations: Sailor, author, journalist, mountaineer, and photographer
- Spouse: Margaret Hale-White (m. 1960–2008)
- Writing career
- Language: English
- Years active: 1965–2009
- Period: 1965–2009
- Notable awards: Blue Water Medal – Cruising Club of America; 1971

Hal Roth (1927 – 18 October 2008) was an American sailor and author. In 1971 he was awarded the Blue Water Medal of the Cruising Club of America. He died of lung cancer.

== Biography ==
=== Early life ===
Hal Roth was born in Cleveland, Ohio, in 1927. He was an aviator during World War II and the Korean War. During the course of his lifetime, Roth was also an author, sailor, mountaineer, and photographer. He graduated from the University of California, Berkeley with a degree in Journalism, and became a free-lance writer and photographer.

=== Marriage ===
In 1959, Roth met Margaret Hale-White from Oxford, England who was visiting a friend in San Francisco, California. Margaret was born in Bombay, India and was the daughter of an English engineer. According to Roth, she worked in Paris for six and a half years as a dual language secretary for the North Atlantic Treaty Organization (NATO). They married in 1960.

=== Photography and journalism ===
Roth studied photography with Edward Weston and Ansel Adams. He was a member of the American Society of Magazine Photographers and worked from a base in Sausalito, California, producing imagery of life in the surrounding area of California during the late 1950s and into the late 1960s. Roth's free-lance works of note include magazine titles such as Colliers, Fortune, The Saturday Evening Post, and The New York Times. Themes of his work include: California landscapes and wildlife, San Francisco (including Fisherman's Wharf), Winter Olympics, Dr. Seuss, and Native American wildland firefighters of the Southwest.

Hal was also engaged in photographic study of human life as represented by his "Time and Place" album and his Chinatown exhibit. In 1964, the San Francisco Museum of Art exhibited 40 of Roth's black and white photographic images titled "The Faces of Chinatown." Roth's first published book, Pathway in the Sky (1965) displays his passion for the John Muir Trail and the Sierra Mountains. The associated images of the John Muir Trail also reflect people enjoying the trail and document its use in the early 1960s.

=== Sailing and writing ===
Even though neither was a sailor, their friends shared a love of sailing and introduced them to the sport in 1962. The couple chartered a boat in the West Indies where they learned a great deal from the captain. Later, they chartered another boat in Greece, then took sailing lessons in Scotland. After purchasing a home in Sausalito in 1964, they took a trip (1966) north along the west coast and purchased a fiberglass Spencer 35, built in Vancouver, British Columbia and designed by John Brandlmayr in Seattle, Washington. They named her Whisper, and sailed her home to California. The Roths began sailing on their own in 1966 and completed several voyages in Whisper. Destinations included Japan, Aleutian Islands, Alaska, Canadian islands, Ecuador, Peru, Chile, Cape Horn, Argentina, Uruguay, Brazil, Mediterranean, and Canary Islands.

The success of his first book, about the John Muir Trail in the Sierra Nevada Mountains, prompted him and his wife to try the precarious worlds of adventuring and writing. They quit their jobs, and began a 19-month voyage around the Pacific in a 35-foot (11 m) sloop. Their vast journey culminated in the publication of his first sailing book, Two on a Big Ocean. He and his wife, Margaret, subsequently made a life of sailing and writing about it, including sailing around South America and a circumnavigation via Panama, the Torres Strait, and Suez.

In 1978, they relocated to Maine.

The couple sold Whisper and purchased the American Flag (later renamed Sebago) and Roth then sailed solo in the Brin's or British Oxygen Company (BOC) Challenge Race of 1986-7. He completed the race 4th in his class of 14, taking 171 days. Chasing the Long Rainbow (1990) is his account of this BOC race. In 1990, he tried the race again in the same Santa Cruz 50 now named Sebago (his sponsor), but due to capsizing, the voyage took 211 days. Chasing the Wind (1994) is his account of the second race. In 1992, they sold Sebago, purchased a Pretorien 35, named her Whisper, and the couple spent two years together tracing Odysseus' voyage through the Mediterranean. We Followed Odysseus, How to Sail Around the World, and Handling Storms at Sea represent books that he wrote based on the couple's final unique voyages.

Roth published hundreds of articles in his lifetime. Although, his book publications appear to be his dominate body of work and document the couple's voyages and growing knowledge of sailing. The 1972 account of their first circumnavigation of the Pacific Basin (1967-8) resulted in the publication Two on a Big Ocean. The Blue Water Medal of the Cruising Club of America was awarded to the Hal Roth, and Margaret was noted as the sole crew, for this voyage. After 50,000 Miles (1977) describes technical aspects of sailing. The 1978 book Two against Cape Horn describes their journey from California to Maine via Cape Horn. Always a Distant Anchorage (1988) describes their four-year (1981–1985) circumnavigation west through the Panama Canal, Torres Strait, the Red Sea, and the Suez Canal.

=== Death and afterward ===
Roth recorded reminisces and continued to draft manuscripts throughout his life. His last two works, The Paradise Book and Graf Spee were completed but never published. He worked on these manuscripts during his later years and during his two and half years suffering from lung cancer. He died October 18, 2008, while living in Maryland with his wife, Margaret, who survives him.

== Honours, decorations, awards and distinctions ==
In 1971 Roth was awarded the Blue Water Medal of the Cruising Club of America in recognition of a cruise of 18,538-nautical-mile (34,332 km; 21,333 mi) around the Pacific Basin, with his wife as crew aboard their 35-foot (11 m) sloop, Whisper.

== Bibliography ==
- Pathway in the Sky : the story of the John Muir trail. Berkeley, CA: Howell-North, 1965. Print.
- Two on a Big Ocean; the Story of the First Circumnavigation of the Pacific Basin in a Small Sailing Ship. New York: Macmillan, 1972. Print.
- After 50,000 miles. New York: Norton, 1977. Print.
- Two against Cape Horn. New York: Norton, 1978. Print.
- The longest race. New York: Norton, 1983. Print.
- Whisper's Pacific Voyage. New Haven, Conn.: Sea TV, 1987. Videocassette.
- Always a distant anchorage. New York: Norton, 1988. Print.
- Chasing the long rainbow : the drama of a singlehanded sailing race around the world. New York: Norton, 1990. Print.
- Chasing the wind : a book of high adventure. Dobbs Ferry, N.Y: Sheridan House, 1994. Print.
- The monster's handsome face : Patty Cannon in fiction & fact. Vienna, Md: Nanticoke Books, 1998. Print.
- We followed Odysseus. Port Washington, Wis: Seaworthy Publications, 1999. Print.
- How to sail around the world : advice and ideas for voyaging under sail. Camden, Me: International Marine/McGraw-Hill, 2004. Print.
- The Hal Roth seafaring trilogy : three true stories of adventure under sail. Camden, Me: International Marine/McGraw-Hill, 2006. Print. [Reprint of three previous works.]
- Handling storms at sea the five secrets of heavy weather sailing. Camden, Me: International Marine/McGraw-Hill, 2009. Print.
- Hal Roth Papers, 1948—2009. San Francisco:San Francisco Maritime National Historical Park, National Park Service, 2011. Archival Material.
