= Balación =

Large sailing outrigger ship of the Philippines

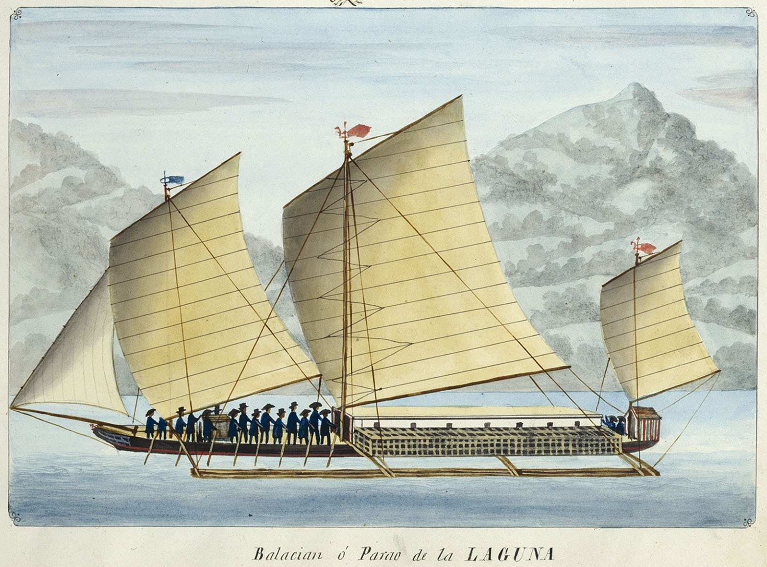
A balación in an 1847 painting by José Honorato Lozano

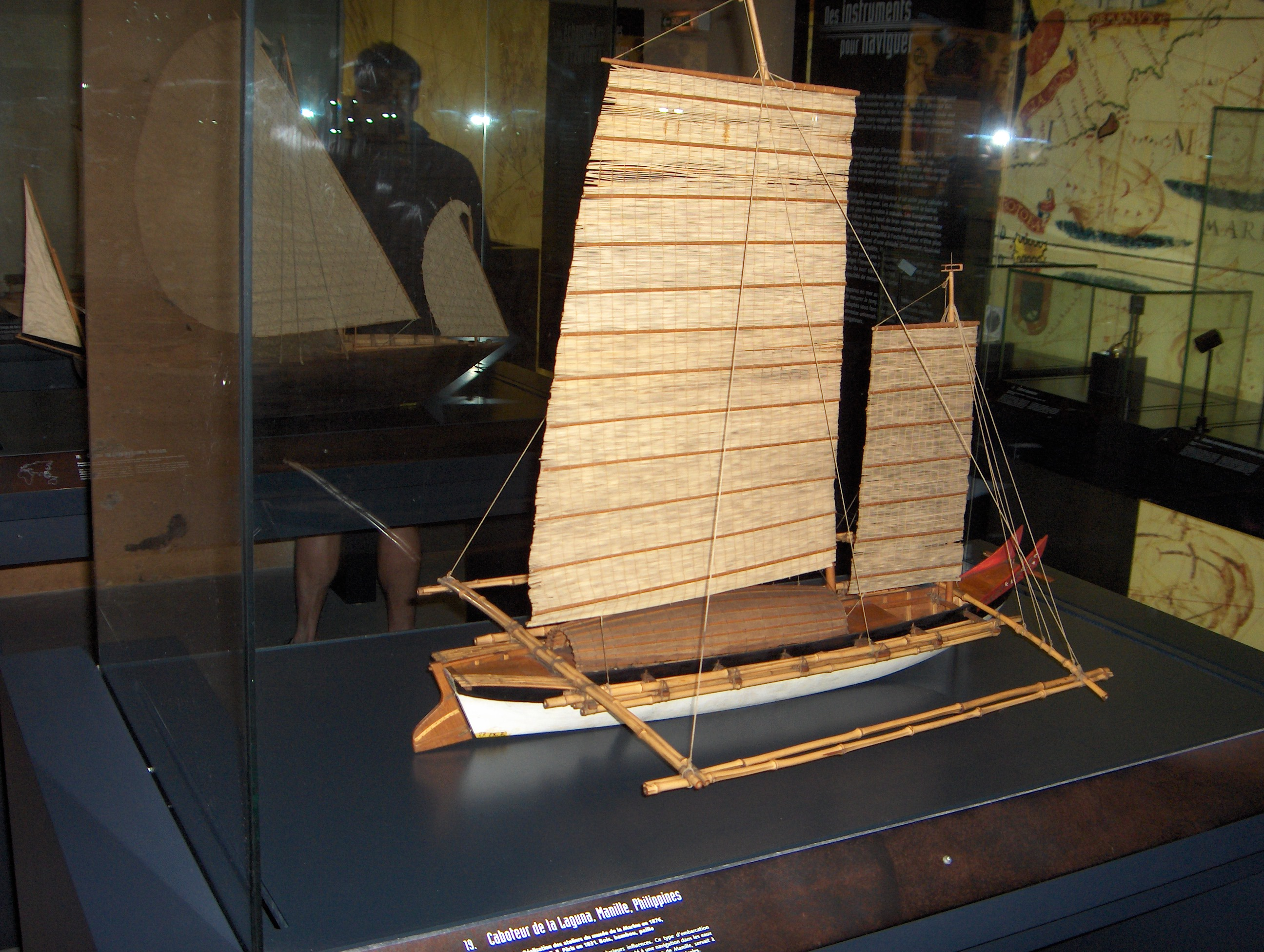
c. 19th-century model of a trading ship from Laguna

Balación, also known as Parao or Balasian, was a large native sailing outrigger ship of the Tagalog people of Laguna in the Philippines.

== See also ==
- Armadahan
- Casco (barge)
- Guilalo
- Salambaw
