= Annie Hill =

British sailor and writer (born 1955)

- Born: 1955 (age 70–71); Liverpool, England, United Kingdom, Europe
- Occupation: Sailor
- Spouses: Pete Hill (div. 2001); Trevor Robertson

Annie Hill (born 1955) is a British sailor. She is best known as an author of books and articles about sailboat voyaging, living on a small amount of money, and sailing junk rigs.

== Biography ==
Annie Hill was born in Liverpool, England, United Kingdom, Europe.

Hill has been voyaging and living aboard various sailing yachts since 1975. Her book Voyaging on a Small Income is a study in the economics of continual travel and self-sufficiency. Hill writes using distinct British vernacular and colloquialisms.

Hill's first two books concerned voyaging aboard Badger, a 34-foot (10 m) double-ended dory with a two-masted junk rig of the schooner style, which was built by Annie and her first husband, Pete Hill. Badger was designed by Jay Benford for plywood construction. Annie's analysis and comparison of the modern junk rig is at least partly responsible for the recent re-popularization of the junk rig.

Hill continued her sailing aboard Iron Bark, a 35-foot (11 m) steel gaff cutter. She and Pete divorced in 2001. She now travels with her second husband, Trevor Robertson. In 2004 and 2005, they spent the winter on Iron Bark frozen in a remote bay in Greenland. She is now based in New Zealand, where she lives aboard a 26-foot (8 m) fibreglass boat, Fantail, which she converted to a junk rig in 2011.
In 2021 she launched her new 26-foot (8 m), whole junk-style plywood boat FanShi.

Hill has covered more than 165,000 nautical miles (306,000 km; 190,000 mi) under sail.

== Awards ==
In March 2010, Hill and Trevor received one of the most prestigious awards in the sailing world, the Blue Water Medal of the Cruising Club of America.

== Bibliography ==
- Hill, Annie; Blackburn, John (1993). Voyaging on a Small Income. Shrewsbury: Waterline. ISBN 1-85310-425-6. LCCN 95108673. OCLC 30733926.
- Hill, Annie (1999). Brazil and Beyond: Long Distance Voyaging with Annie Hill. Shrewsbury: Waterline. ISBN 1-84037-077-7. OCLC 42367171.
