= Axel Ingwersen =

Sailor

Axel Ingwersen was a winner of the 1924 Blue Water Medal for his sailing trip where he departed Shanghai on February 20, 1923, and arrived in Denmark past the Cape of Good Hope in May 1924. He was sailing a double-ended ketch, 47 feet (14 m) length overall, built by native laborers. He had a crew of three with him. He was in 1933 the Chief Officer of the C.S. Pacific based in Shanghai, a cable steamer involved in undersea cable maintenance owned by the Great Northern Telegraph Co. Ltd of 4 Avenue Edward VII, Shanghai.
