= Suntory Mermaid II =

Japanese-designed catamaran

Suntory Mermaid II is a 9.5-metre, 3-tonne catamaran driven by wave power. It features two fin tails which absorb wave energy and generate thrust by moving up and down with the motion of the boat. The ship was designed by Hiroshi Terao of Tokai University.

== World record ==
On March 16, 2008, then 69-year-old Japanese sailor and environmentalist Kenichi Horie left the Hawaii Yacht Club, Honolulu, in Suntory Mermaid II, bound for Japan. He arrived on July 4, 2008 in the Kii Channel offshore of Hinomisaki cape, Wakayama, without incident. Horie had made the world's longest solo voyage in a wave-powered boat, using green technology.

The non-stop voyage across the Western Pacific Ocean took 110 days and covered 7,000 kilometres (3,780 nautical miles). During the voyage, Horie ate mostly rice, curry, squid and flying fish he caught. The 9.5 metre (31-foot), three-ton yacht used wave energy to move two fins at its bow and propel it forward, sailing at an average speed of 1.5 knots. After arriving in Wakayama, Horie sailed on to his home harbour in Nishinomiya, where a homecoming ceremony was held.

Suntory Mermaid II was powered by single solar battery and made from recycled materials. Horie said: "Throughout history, mankind has used wind for power, but no one has appeared to be serious about wave power. I think I'm a lucky boy as this wave power system has remained virtually untouched."
