= Guilalo =

Traditional Philippine sailing vessel

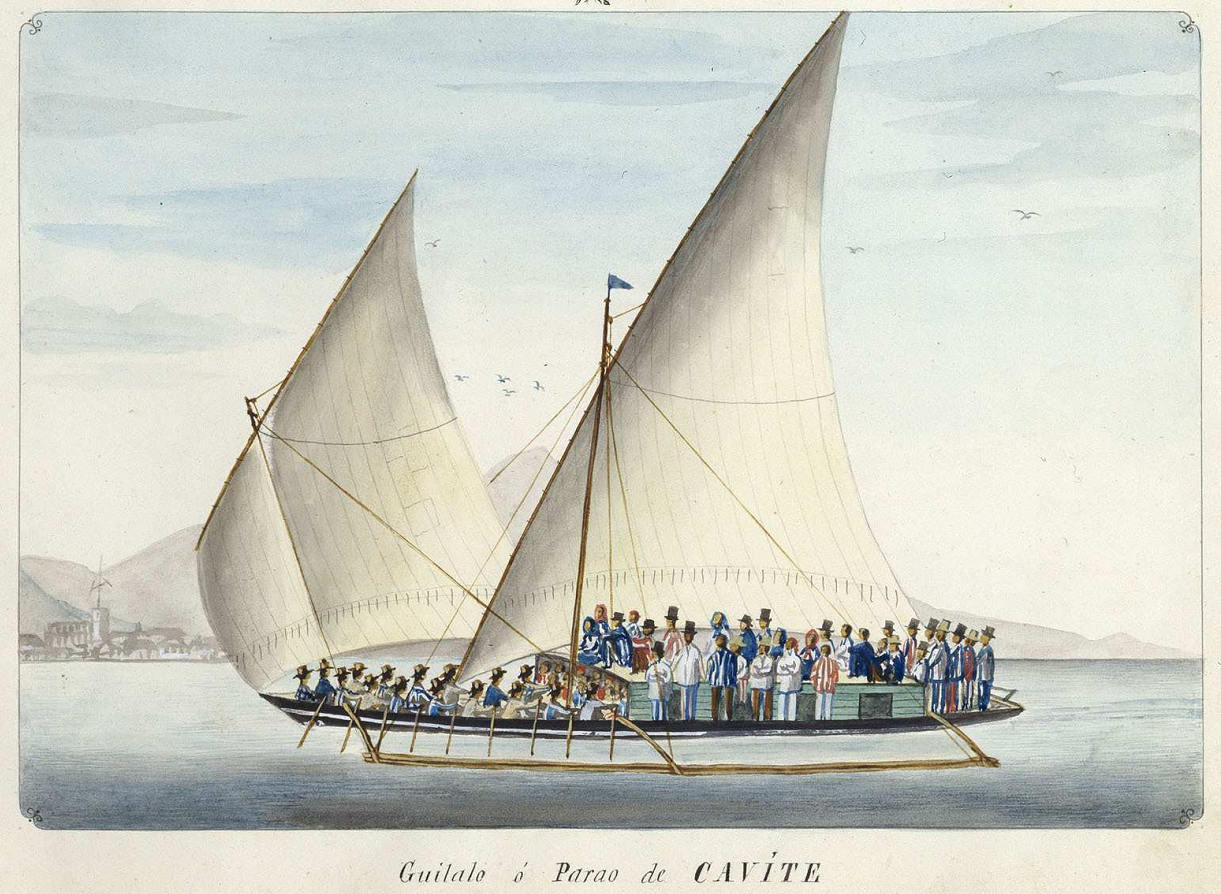
A guilalo in an 1847 painting by José Honorato Lozano

Guilalo (also spelled gilalo, jilalo, bilalo, or guilálas) were large Tagalog outrigger ships from the Philippines. They were common vessels in Manila Bay in the 18th and 19th centuries. They were easily identifiable by their two large settee sails made with woven fiber. They were steered by a central rudder and can be rowed with round-bladed oars.

They ferried passengers and trade goods (like dried fish and fruits) between Manila and Cavite. They were also used in the Batangas region.

They were also sometimes referred to as tafurea (or tarida) in Spanish, due to their similarity in appearance to the Medieval European tafurea, a flat-bottomed sailing ship used to transport horses. They are also sometimes known as "panco", a Spanish general term for bangka.

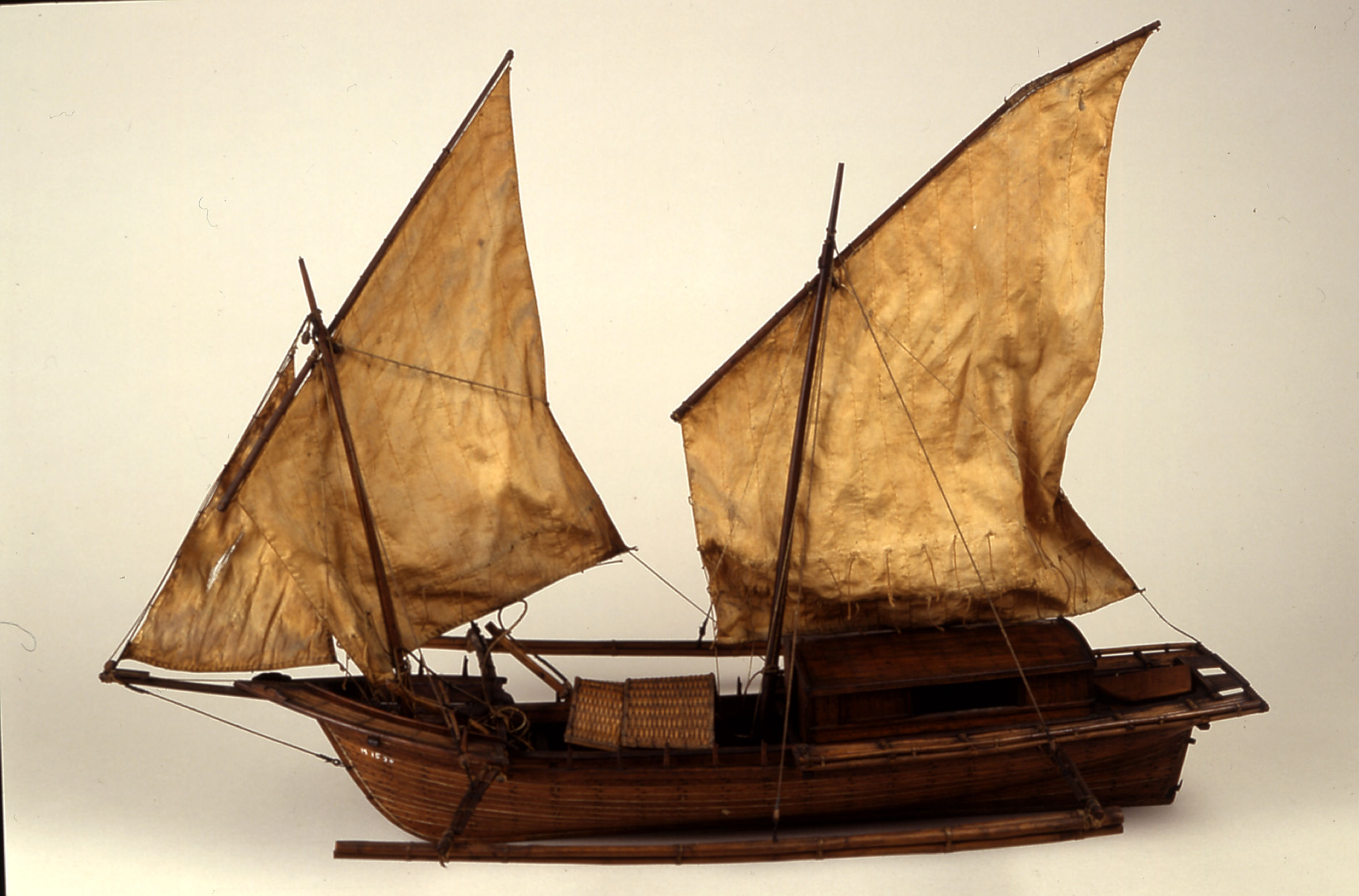
Model of a guilalo displayed in the 1887 Exposición General de las Islas Filipinas in Madrid

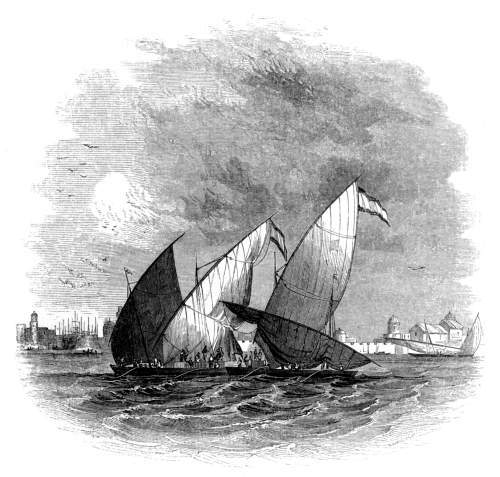
Guilalo ships in Manila Bay, in a woodcut in Frank Marryat's Borneo and the Indian Archipelago (1848)

== See also ==
- Balación
- Balangay
- Bangka (boat), Philippine outrigger sailing ships, also spelled banca or panca
- Casco (barge)
- Dhow
- Garay (ship)
- Karakoa
- Lepa (ship)
- Paraw
- Salambaw
