= Casco (barge) =

Square-ended barge from the Philippines

Cascos are flat-bottomed square-ended barges from the Philippines. They were used mostly to carry cargo along lakes and rivers, and as lighters to transport goods and passengers to and from moored ships. Though they resemble the sampan, they are much larger with two detachable masts with junk rigs made of woven fiber. They also possess outrigger-like platforms along the entire length of the sides, which is used by punters with barge poles when traversing shallow water. They were steered by an oar or a central rudder by a helmsman housed in a small raised platform at the stern. The entire deck is covered almost entirely in removable curving or pitched panels.

Cascos were most prevalent in southern Luzon, particularly along the Pasig River and Laguna de Bay, as well as in the Manila Bay harbor. In the late 18th and early 19th centuries, they were often strung together in a train drawn by a steamship (vapor). They were used as transport ships by American troops in Laguna de Bay during the Philippine–American War. Cascos are still used today in fluvial parades. An example is during the celebrations of Our Lady of Peñafrancia in Naga City, Bicol.

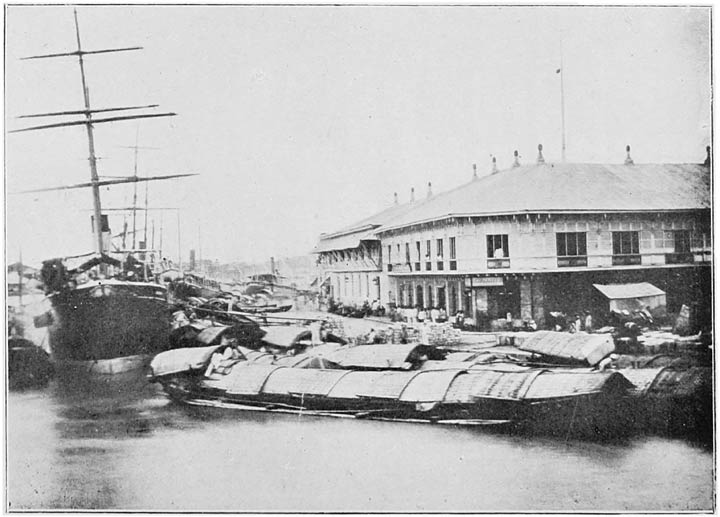
Casco (foreground) in Manila (c. 1900)

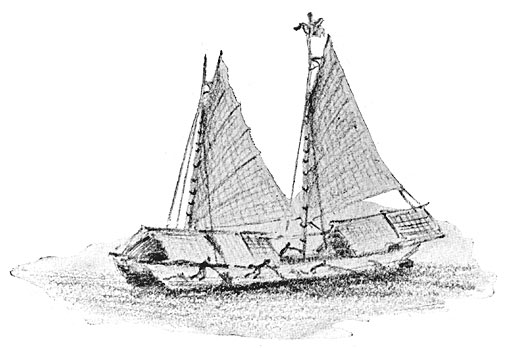
Drawing of a casco (c. 1906)

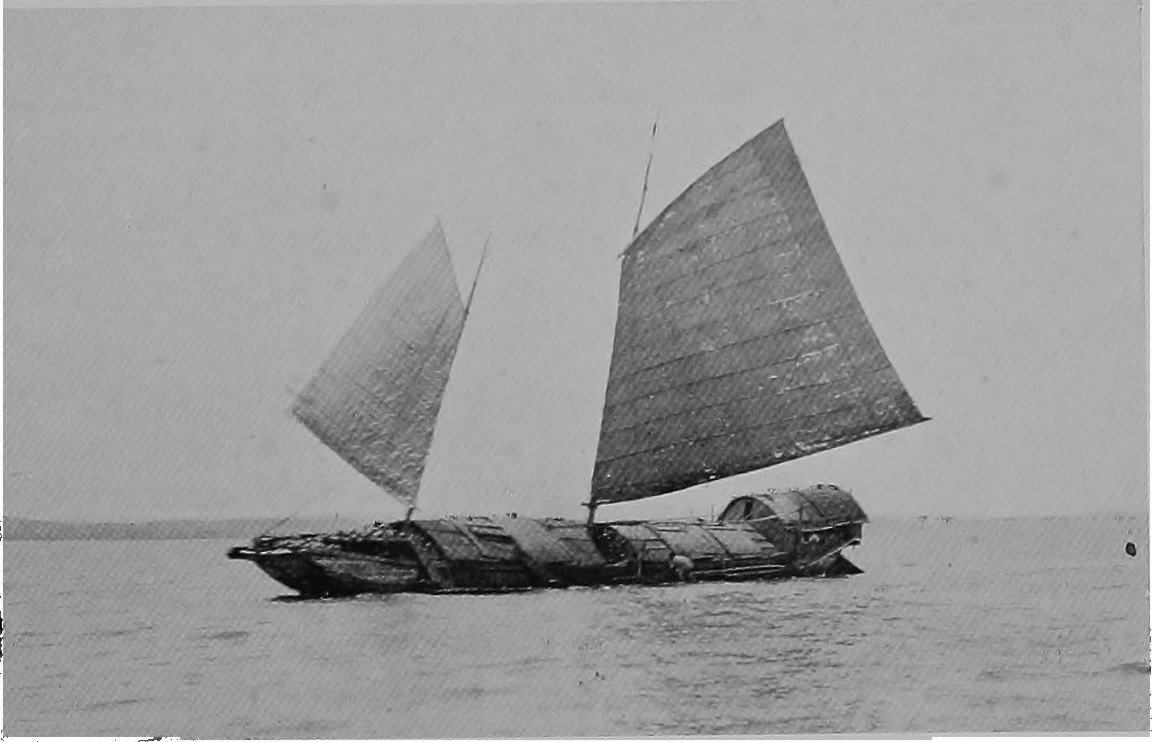
A casco in Manila Bay in full sail (c. 1906)

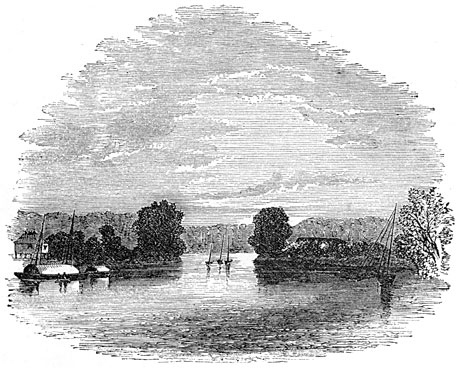
An 1855 woodcut with a casco (left) in a woodcut on the entrance to the Pasig River from Manila Bay

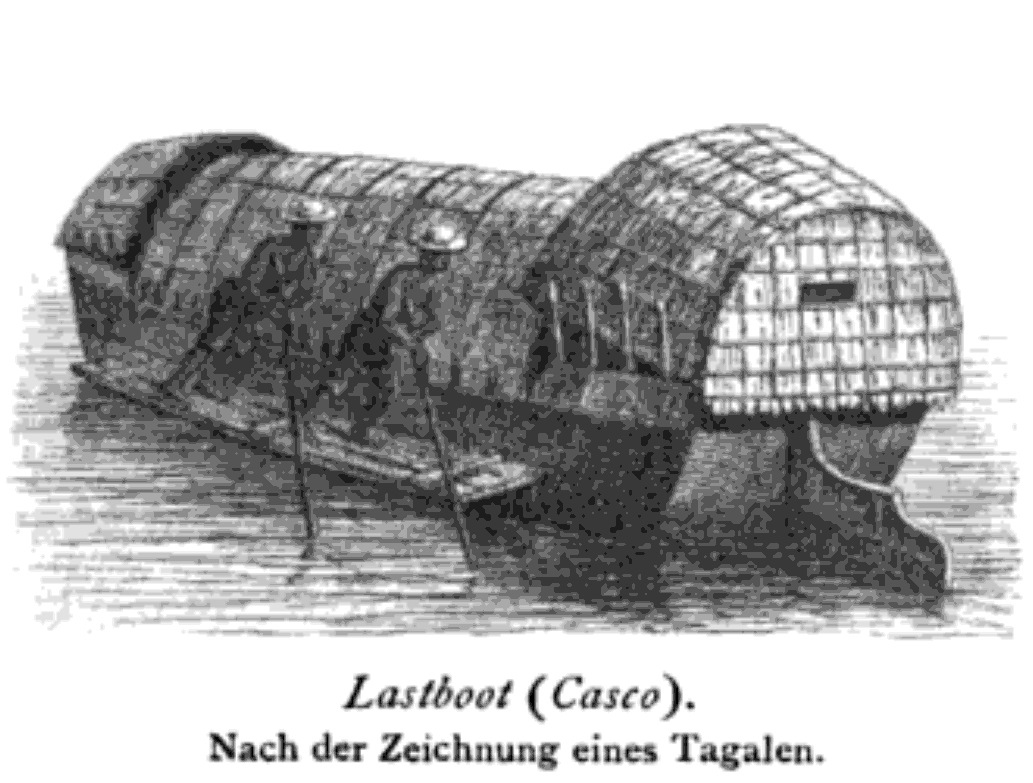
A casco with two punters (1873)

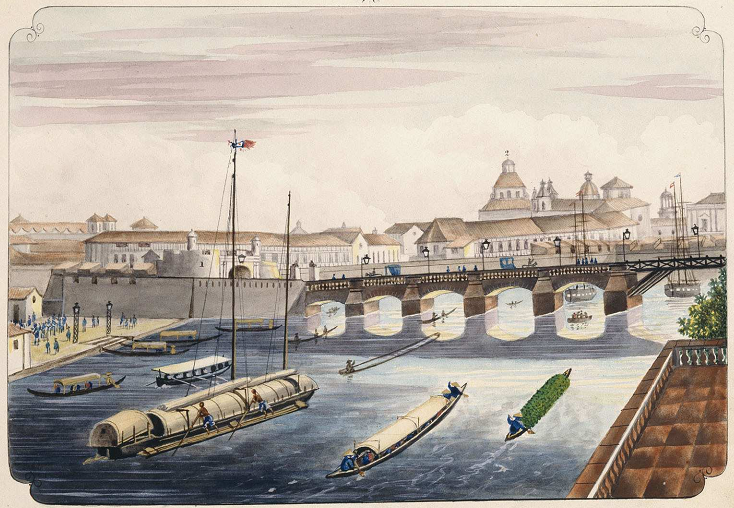
Vista del Puente de Manila, an 1847 painting by José Honorato Lozano showing a casco (center left) and several sampans and other river boats

== See also ==
- Balangay
- Garay
- Guilalo
- Junk (ship), sailing ships of China
- Karakoa, raiding ship of the Visayas
- Paraw
- Salambaw
- Sampan, the Malay and Chinese version of the Casco
