= Kenichi Horie =

Japanese sailor

Kenichi Horie (堀江 謙一, Horie Ken'ichi; born September 8, 1938 in Osaka) is a Japanese solo yachtsman. In 1962 he became the first person to sail solo and non-stop across the Pacific Ocean. He has made other significant solo voyages, usually involving boats exhibiting some sort of environmentally friendly theme, including his 2008 voyage across the Western Pacific Ocean in a wave-powered boat, the Suntory Mermaid II.

In 2022, he became the oldest man to sail solo non-stop across the Pacific. He began his journey in San Francisco, USA on March 27, arriving in Japan on June 4.

== Book and article ==
Horie wrote a book about his voyage, titled Alone on the Pacific (Kodoku), which was made into a movie Alone Across the Pacific (also titled My Enemy, The Sea) in 1963 by Kon Ichikawa. The movie was nominated for a Golden Globe award. The Mermaid is currently on display in the San Francisco Maritime National Historical Park Maritime Museum.

He also translated the book Ice Bird: The first single-handed voyage to Antarctica by Australian adventurer David Lewis into Japanese.

== Voyages ==
Horie has made numerous solo voyages.

=== First solo voyage across the Pacific ===
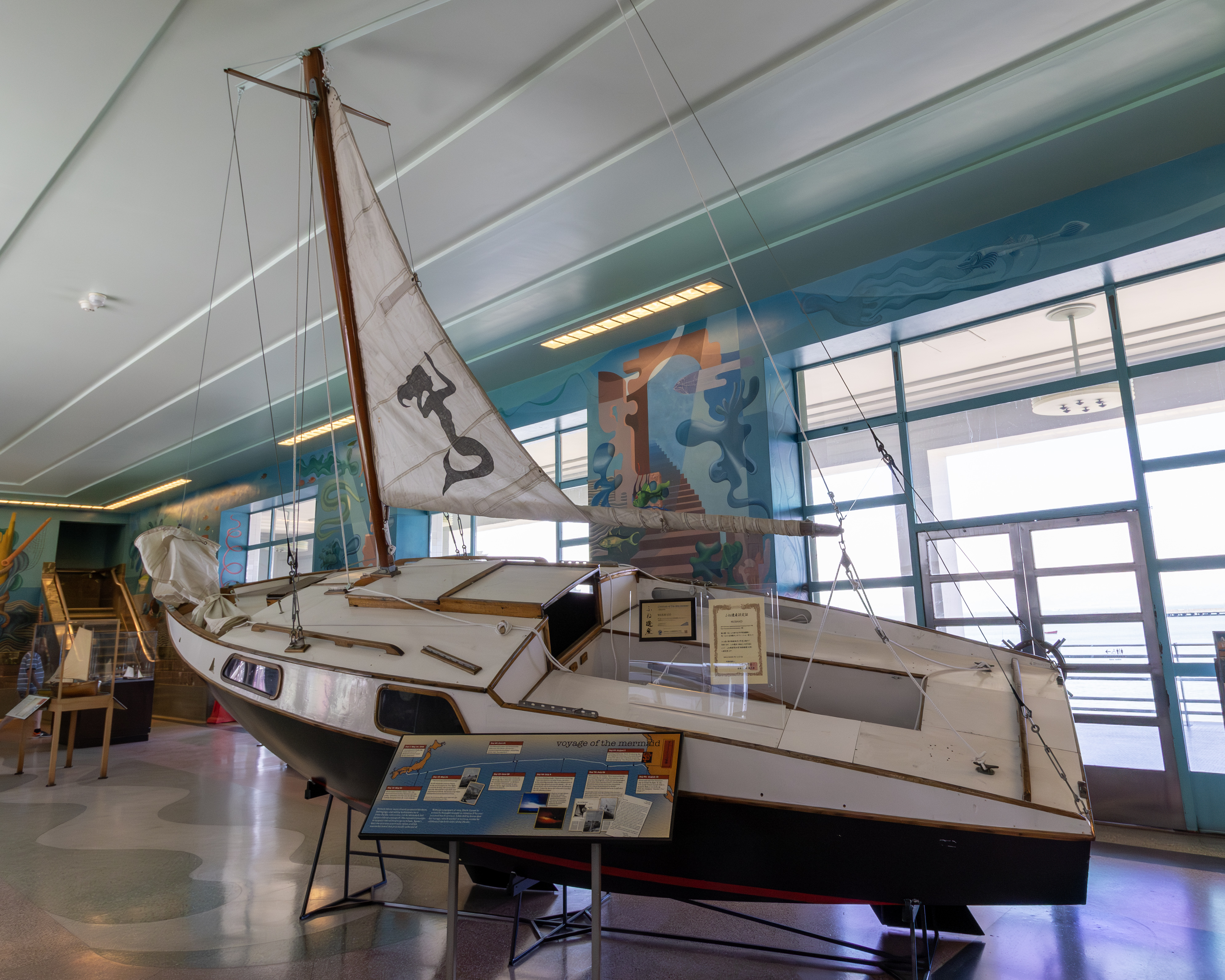
Mermaid in the San Francisco Maritime Museum

In 1962, at the age of 23, Kenichi Horie sailed alone across the Pacific Ocean from Japan to San Francisco aboard a 19-foot (5.8 m) plywood sailboat called the Mermaid. He departed Nishinomiya, Japan, on May 12, 1962, and arrived in San Francisco, California, U.S., on August 11. Despite Horie's best effort to legally depart from Japan, and because of the lack of precedent for international travel on a small sailboat, he was not able to obtain a passport or an adequate amount of foreign currency. He arrived with no passport or money and was initially arrested. After learning of his voyage, San Francisco Mayor George Christopher arranged for him to be freed. He was given a 30-day visa and the key to the city.

=== Other voyages ===
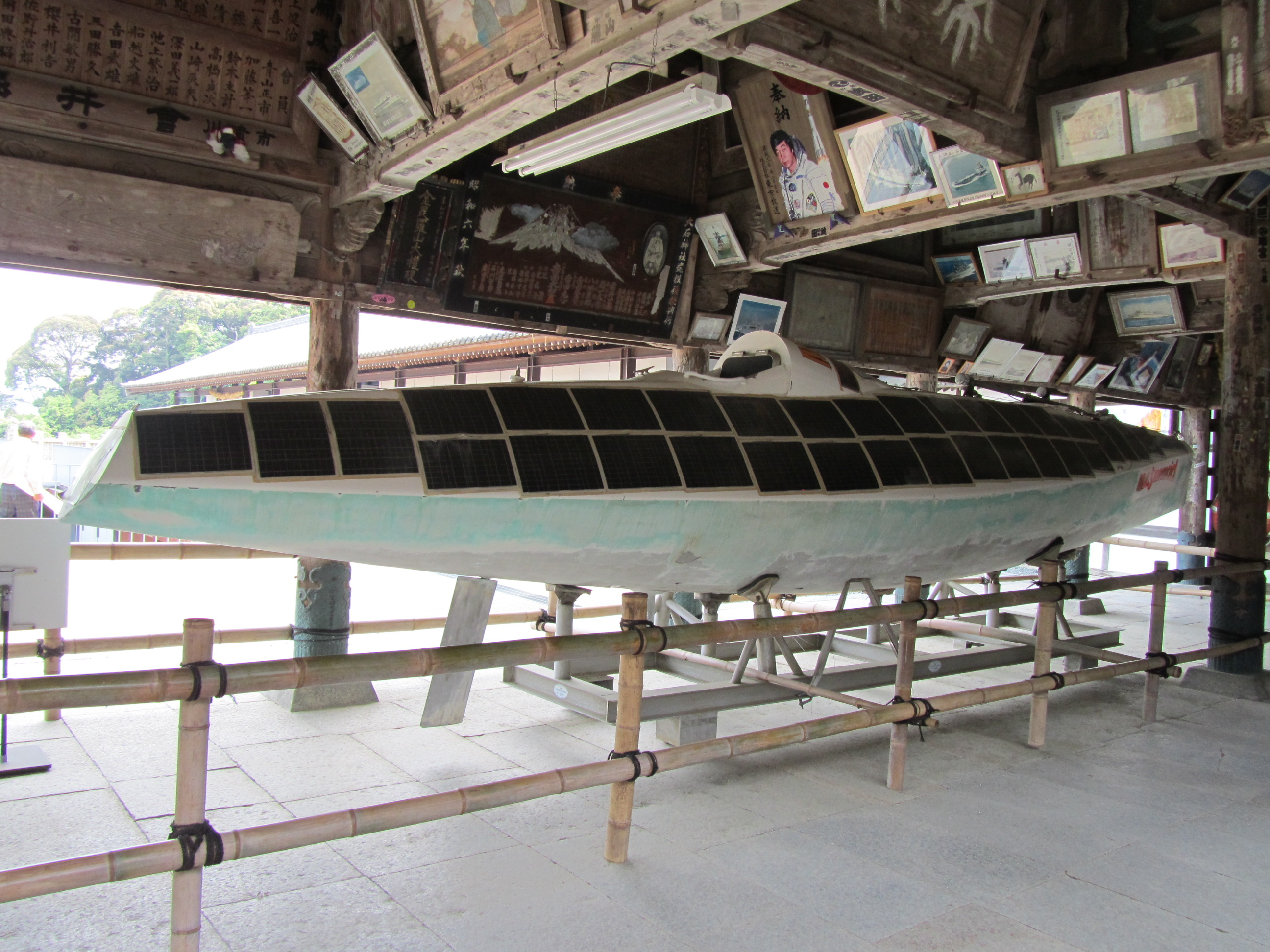
Malt's Mermaid next to the main hall of Kotohira-gu.

In 1974, he circumnavigated from east to west, and in 1978 he circumnavigated from north to south. In 1985, he sailed a solar boat from Hawaii to Chichijima. From 1992 to 1993, he sailed from Hawaii to Okinawa in a pedal powered boat. In 1996, Horie sailed from Salinas, Ecuador to Tokyo in a solar boat made of recycled aluminum. This crossing covered 10,000 miles (16,000 km) in 148 days which earned the Guinness World Record for the fastest crossing of the Pacific in a solar-powered boat. The Malt's Mermaid is on display at Kotohira-gū Shrine in Shikoku, close to the main hall.

In 1999, he sailed from San Francisco to Japan aboard a boat made primarily from recycled materials. The boat, Malt's Mermaid II, designed by Kennosuke Hayashi, was a 32.8-foot (10.0 m) long, 17.4-foot (5.3 m) wide, catamaran constructed from 528 beer kegs welded end-to-end in five rows. Horie joked that 500 of them were empty. The rigging consisted of two side-by-side masts with junk rig sails made from recycled plastic bottles. This boat is on display in Okura Beach, Akashi.

In 2002, Horie sailed from Nishinomiya to San Francisco aboard the Mermaid III, which was a replica of the original Mermaid constructed from a variety of recycled materials, including whiskey barrels for the hull, aluminum cans for the mast and plastic soda bottles for the sails.

==== First ocean wave-powered voyage ====
In 2008, Horie travelled solo from Hawaii to the Kii Peninsula in western Japan aboard the 9.5-meter, 3-tonne catamaran Suntory Mermaid II, built at Tsuneishi Shipyard. The voyage was the first in a vessel propelled on ocean wave power alone.

Horie took more than three months to sail from Hawaii to Japan in his wave-powered boat, arriving in Japan on July 4, 2008, but said he was blessed with good weather and tasty fish. Horie ate mostly rice and curry, squid and flying fish he caught.

Kenichi left Honolulu on March 16, 2008, and completed the 110-day solo voyage at the port of Wakayama in the channel between Honshu and Shikoku islands before midnight (1500 GMT) Friday, July 4, 2008. He covered the 7,000 kilometres (3,780 nautical miles) from Hawaii without a port call. His yacht used wave energy to move two fins at its bow and propel it forward, and sailed at an average speed of 1.5 knots. His final home harbour is in the port of Nishinomiya. As an environmentalist, he promotes the use of environmentally friendly boats including those powered by solar battery, are made from recycled materials. He is quoted as saying: "Throughout history, mankind has used wind for power, but no one has appeared to be serious about wave power. I think I'm a lucky boy as this wave power system has remained virtually untouched."
