= Cruising Club of America =

Cruising Club Of America burgee

The Cruising Club of America (CCA) is an international organization of cruisers whose objects are to promote cruising and racing by amateurs, to encourage the development of suitable types of cruising craft, to stimulate interest in seamanship, navigation and handling small vessels, and to keep on file all information which may be of assistance to members in cruising in any waters.

== About ==
The CCA was launched in the winter of 1922 at Maskells Harbour on Nova Scotia's Bras d'Or Lake by a handful of experienced offshore cruisers interested in cruising The founders included Gilbert Hovey Grosvenor, F.W. (Casey) Baldwin, William Washburn Nutting, Jim Dorsett, and William A. Wise Wood.

As of 2021, the club has more than 1,400 members, including 116 women. Members range from 25 to 99 years of age, averaging 70.7 years. CCA members report owning 1,036 boats, averaging 41.3 feet. This includes 702 sailing yachts, 225 powerboats, and 49 "undesignated" boats."

CCA's members personify the interests, achievement, experience, and love and respect for the sea of the club's founders. During the year of its 100th anniversary, the CCA stated that they continue to use the collective wisdom and experience of its members to influence the "adventurous use of the sea" through efforts to elevate good seamanship, the design of seaworthy yachts, safe yachting practices, and environmental awareness.

The Cruising Club of America has no clubhouse or shoreside base, and no paid staff. Rather, the Club is structured around national committees that conduct mission-related work and manage the administrative operations of the organization, and around geographical Stations that provide regional focus for the membership.

Primary mission-focused committees include Safety at Sea, Offshore Communications, Technical, Environment, Cruising Guides and Charts, Bermuda Race, and Awards. The Club is managed by a Governing Board of officers and elected members, and operated by standing committees including Finance, Audit, Nominating, and Membership, to name but a few.

The club has eleven stations, each with its own rear commodore and officers, and its own annual activities. The stations are: Bermuda, Bras d'Or, Boston (including Buzzards Bay Post, Gulf of Maine Post, and Narragansett Bay Post), Chesapeake, Essex, Florida, Great Lakes, New York, Pacific Northwest, San Francisco, and Southern California.

Membership is by invitation. According to the CCA constitution, "A person eligible for membership in the club must be a sailor and a person of acceptable character and personality who has demonstrated his or her ability to handle or command and navigate and pilot a small vessel at sea, and who has had sufficient cruising experience." According to the club's candidate qualifications guidelines and policies, "a sailor" is defined as follows: "This word does not exclude a seaman by trade or profession. It has long ceased to mean only a rope-and-canvas seaman; the mariner in power is likewise a sailor. We consider, however, that a candidate who cruises under power should have established his or her qualifications under sail."

With the Royal Bermuda Yacht Club, the CCA sponsors the biennial Bermuda Race from Newport, Rhode Island to Bermuda. It was responsible for developing the CCA Rule, which, until the advent of the International Offshore Rule, was the handicapping rule used for most handicapped yacht racing in North America.
