= Prout =

Prout may refer to:

== Surname ==
- Christopher Prout, Baron Kingsland (1942–2009), British politician
- Ebenezer Prout (1835–1909), English composer, music theorist, writer and teacher
- Elizabeth Prout (1820–1864), Catholic nun and Servant of God
- Francis Sylvester Mahony (1804–1866), Irish humorist known as Father Prout
- Frank Prout (1921–2011), British canoer
- Gavin Prout (born 1978), Canadian lacrosse player
- George Prout (1878 – c. 1980), Canadian politician
- Jacob W. Prout (1804–1849), Liberian politician and physician
- John Skinner Prout (1805–1876), artist, nephew of Samuel Prout
- John T. Prout (1880–1969), Irish American soldier
- Kirsten Prout (born 1990), Canadian actress
- Louis Beethoven Prout (1864–1943), English entomologist and musicologist, son of Ebenezer Prout
- Richard Prout (born 1967), British entrepreneur, founder of Intracus Ltd
- Roland Prout (1920–1997), British canoer
- Samuel Prout (1783–1852), British watercolourist
- Samuel T. Prout (born 1855), Liberian postmaster
- William Prout (1785–1850), English chemist and physicist
- William A. Prout, Liberian politician
- William C. Prout (1886–1927), American athlete

== Other uses ==
- Progressive Utilization Theory (PROUT)
- Prout (unit), a unit of nuclear binding energy
- The Prout School, a high school in Rhode Island, United States
- Prout's hypothesis, a 19th century hypothesis about the structure of the atom
- Prouts Neck, Maine
- Reliques of Father Prout
- G. Prout & Sons, British company making catamarans

== See also ==
- Prouty (disambiguation)
