= Geoffrey Prout =

English boatbuilder and author

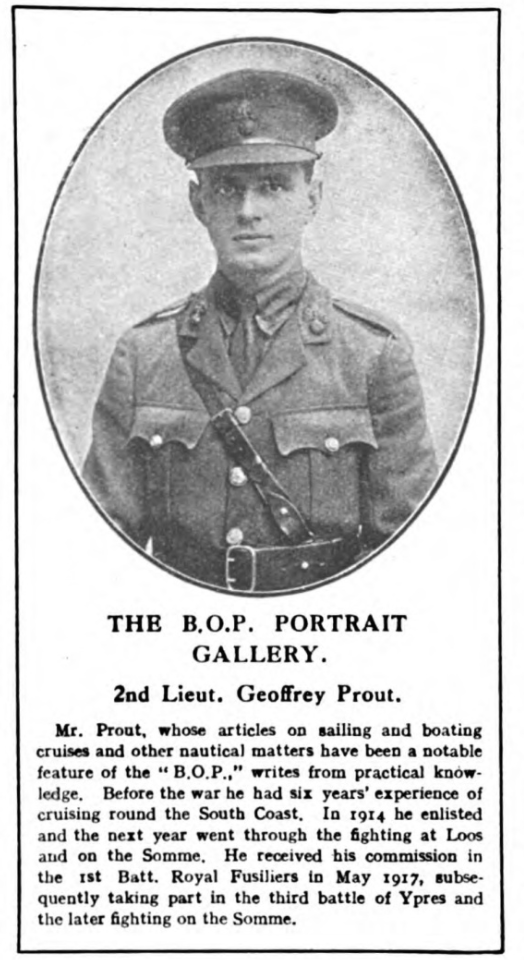
Geoffrey Prout boat builder and writer in his World War I uniform

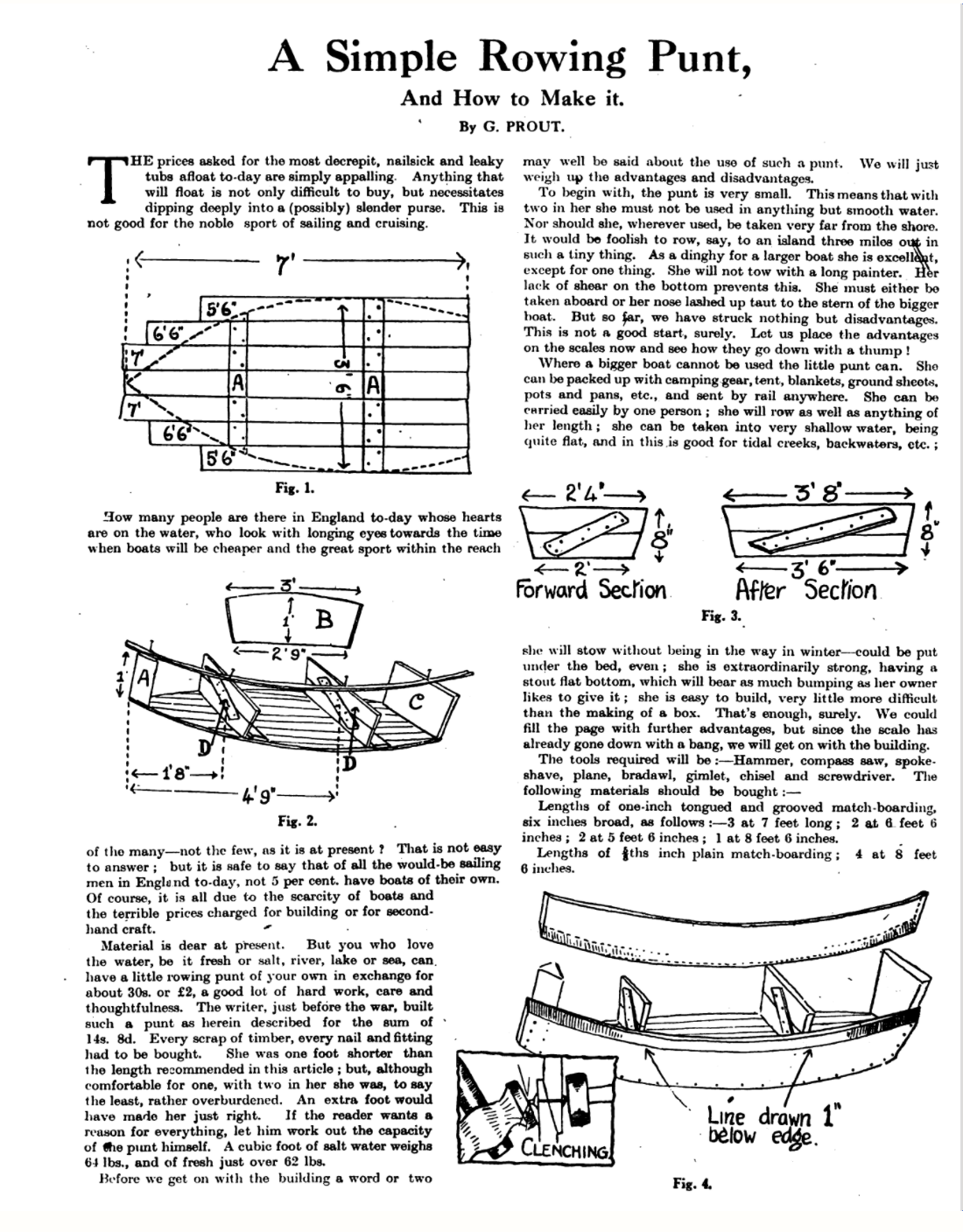
George Prout's article, "A Simple Rowing Punt" published in The Boy’s Own Paper (1921)

Geoffrey Prout (1894-1960) (pseudonym Roland Spencer) was an English boat builder, soldier, and author. From the 1910s to 1960s Prout wrote non-fiction boating works and juvenile adventure fiction.

== Early life ==
Prout was born in Saxilby in 1894 to Anne Isabel and William Henry Prout, a customs officer and Devonshire native, and Geoffrey Prout spent at least part of his youth in Plymouth By 1911 Prout was working for an auctioneer in Plymouth, and he began publishing extensively in The Boy’s Own Paper regarding boating related topics and then in various other publications. Prior to World War I he "had six years' experience of cruising round the South Coast." During World War I Prout joined the Devonshire Regiment in 1914 and trained at Aldershot before being sent to France where he saw major action over several years at Loos, Somme, and Ypres. While recovering from war injuries at a French hospital in London he met and married a Swiss woman, Marguerite Louise Grandpierre in 1919. They had two sons and in 1922 the family moved via motorcycle and sidecar to Canvey Island, Essex where they built a bungalow on the Point made partially of driftwood.

== Career ==
After the War, Prout continued writing about boats and juvenile fiction, including publishing several books. In 1935 he founded G. Prout and Sons of Canvey Island after receiving a patent for his collapsible canoe in January 1935. The company initially built folding dinghies, canoes and kayaks, but by the 1950s, the company shifted to producing larger boats, particularly, catamarans. Geoffrey's sons Francis and Roland were canoeists who took part in the 1952 Summer Olympics in Helsinki, and joined him in the business and focused on the production of catamarans. In the flooding of 1953 Prout was instrumental in saving at least one hundred lives, and he was featured in the newsreels. Geoffrey Prout died on 15 April 1960, and was buried in the St. Katherine Churchyard on Canvey Island. Many of his early writings in The Boy's Own Paper are still available online via the HathiTrust library.

His 1931 book Scouts in Bondage (Aldine Press), which has been described as "a simple adventure story of its time, designed to promote the values of Scouting", inspired a secondhand bookseller from Lewes, Michael Bell, to compile Scouts in Bondage: And Other Curious Titles From Bygone Times With Titles That Might Cause Vulgar Minds To Misapprehend Their Content (2007, Aurum Press: ISBN 978-1845131968), published in the United States by Simon & Schuster as Scouts in Bondage: And Other Violations of Literary Propriety (ISBN 978-1416549239).

== Works published ==
- "Weather Wisdom", The Boy's Own Paper, 25 Nov 1911
- "The "Boy’s Own" Weather Vane and How to Make It", The Boy's Own Paper, 30 Mar 1912.
- "Harness the Wind!", The Boy's Own Paper, 11 May 1912
- "Anyone Going Cruising?", Chums, 14 Jun 1925
- Trawler Boy Dick: A Story of the Devon Fishing Fleet (1927)
- Witherington Wilds: A Story of the Essex Coast (1929)
- Brown's Pocket-Book for Yachtsmen (1930; 4th ed 1965)
- Scouts in Bondage: A Story of Boy Scouts in Strange Adventure (1930)
- Motor Boating for Beginners (1931)
- The Scouts of Windhaven (1931)
- The Secret of the Sands (1933)
- Simple Boat Building (1934)
- Mystery Marsh (1939)
- Yachting: How to Sail and Manage a Small Modern Yacht (1947)
