= Mast-aft rig =

Sailboat rig

A mast-aft rig is a sailboat rig that uses a single mast set in the aft half of the hull. The mast supports a sail plan that may consist of a single jib, multiple staysails, or a crab claw sail. The mainsail is either small or completely absent. Mast-aft rigs are uncommon, but are found on a few custom, and production sailboats.

== Comparison to other single mast rigs ==
Many mast-aft rigs utilize a small mainsail and multiple staysails that can resemble some cutter rigs. A cutter is a single masted vessel, differentiated from a sloop either by the number of staysails, with a sloop having one and a cutter more than one, or by the position of the mast, with a cutter's mast being located between 50% and 70% of the way from the aft to the front of the sailplan, and a sloop's mast being located forward of the 70% mark. A mast-aft rig could, based on headsail count, be considered a variation of the sloop or cutter, or, based on mast position, a unique rig.

== Advantages ==
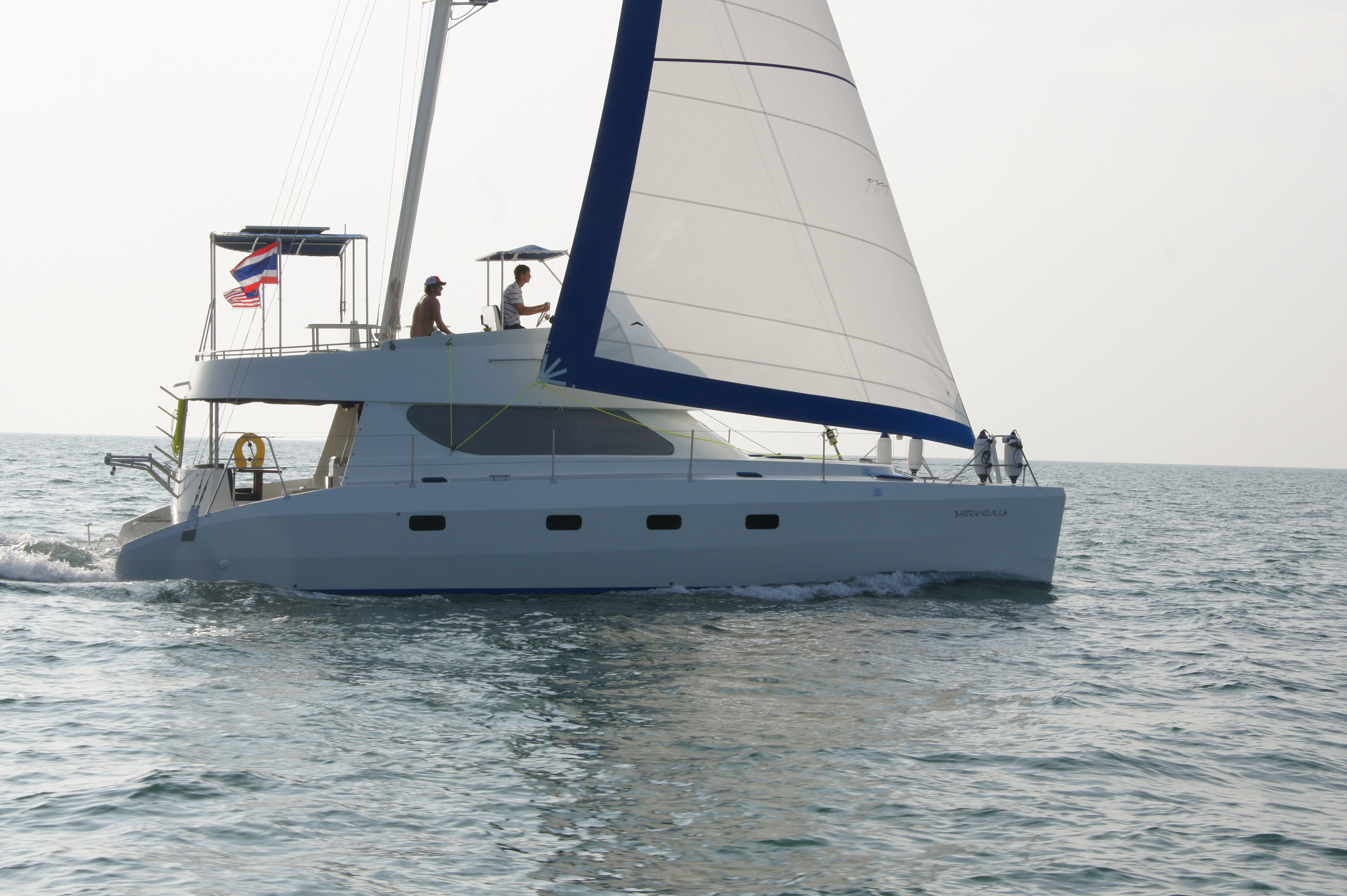
With no boom that could sweep them into the sea, sailors on this mast-aft rig are able to utilize the roof of the pilot house.

In the typical Bermuda rig, the sails located in front of the mast generally deliver a higher percentage of the driving force. The stay that supports the leading edge of the sail causes far less turbulence than a mast, resulting in better airflow across the lee side of the sail. To take advantage of this fact, Bermuda rigs are shifting towards larger fore-sails and smaller mainsails. Fore-sails include jibs, genoas and staysails. The cutter, with its use of multiple foresails, achieves the same goal of placing a higher percentage of the sail area in staysails.

By moving the mast toward the back of the sailboat, designers can increase the size and driving power of the more efficient foresails. The mainsail is reduced in size or eliminated altogether. An advantage of using foresails, also called staysails, is that they may be rigged for roller furling. This allows the sail(s) to quickly and easily be deployed and reefed by pulling lines. The sail rolls up around the stay. This simplicity and easy operation is one of the main attractions of the mast-aft rig.

By reducing the mainsail in size or eliminating it altogether, the aft mast rig squarely minimizes or completely solves the problems associated with battens. Battens enable designers to increase the size of mainsails by pushing the mainsail away from the mast. However, the forces of the battens pushing against the mast make it more difficult to raise or lower the mainsail. On larger rigs, "batten cars" are needed to overcome these forces.

By eliminating the battens and associated batten cars, the material cost savings for a typical 60-ft catamaran can be as much as $12,000 AUD. Aft-mast rigs with no mainsail also require fewer winches to raise and lower sails, and no winches to move the boom. When "Hot Buoys" converted from a Bermuda rig to an aft-mast rig 5 winches were no longer required.

For rigs with no mainsail, there is also no boom. This saves the cost of the boom, and hardware and lines associated with the boom. More importantly, eliminating the boom is a matter of safety. The second leading cause of death on sailboats is the boom. Booms cause injuries and deaths directly and indirectly by knocking people overboard. Even when stationary, booms represent a hazard. According to a German study, "boom strikes were the most common cause of sailing injury overall". Another aspect of safety is in regards to the elimination of the lines and hardware to control the boom. With fewer lines and less hardware on the deck there are fewer items to trip over or trap fingers and hands.

== Disadvantages ==
Mast-aft rigs depend on a large foresail which, like any sail, becomes more difficult to manage with its size. This is particularly true when sailors do not want to use roller furling, e.g., because they do not want to compromise speed.

Mast-aft rigs are viewed as unconventional, and since recreational sailors often choose boats based on what "looks" right, mast-aft rigs face resistance in the recreational market. Racing sailors will use whatever is fastest within class rules, and class rules are generally very closely tied to the conventional Bermuda rig.

Another disadvantage of the mast-aft rig, when set up with no mainsail, is the drag on the mast. While the mast may interfere with the airflow around the mainsail, the mainsail also serves to reduce the drag on the mast. By not having a sail attached to the trailing edge of the mast, the mast becomes a significant source of drag. Additionally if there is no mainsail there is difficulty in heaving to or coming to rest with sails set and boat "weathercocked" with bows into the wind. This can make the boat much more vulnerable in storms when a partly furled foresail has exactly the wrong effect on boat position relative to wind and waves while hove-to and this, though less of an issue for racing, is still an issue for long-distance cruising.

The performance of the sail is dependent on having a forestay which is taut. If the forestay is allowed to slack, the sail will lose its airfoil shape and not perform as well. This requires heavy rigging with high tension which adds stress to the overall sail rig system; this is not really a disadvantage per se but rather a parameter to consider if rigging a sailboat to use a mast-aft rig.

== Commercial production examples ==
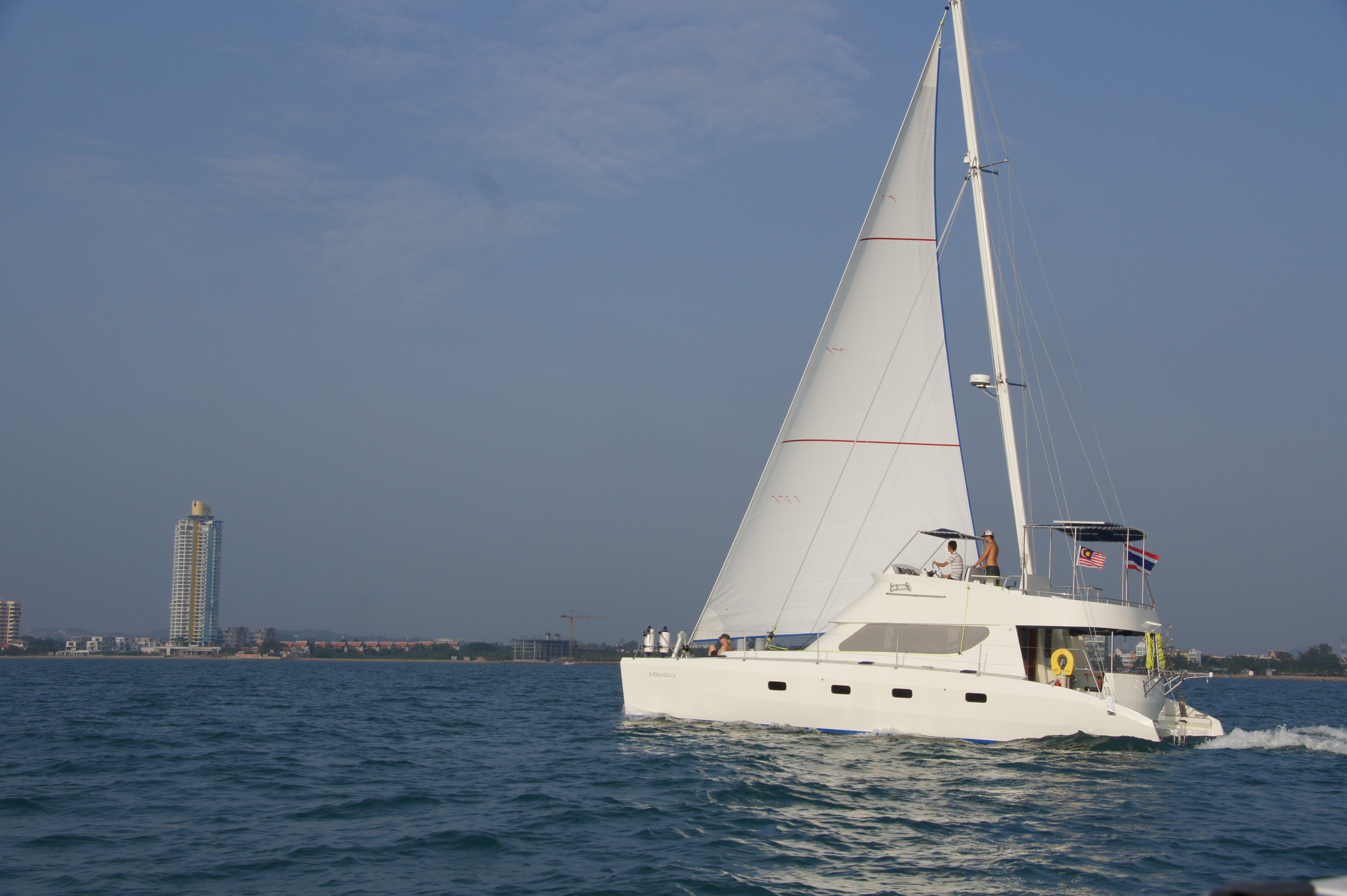
Model "HK-40" By RB Power and Sail of Thailand.

An early successful mast-aft design was built by Prout Catamarans, Ltd. The Snowgoose models were offered with a mast-aft rig, and it boasted a number of features that made short-handed sailing easier than with a standard Bermuda rig. Broadblue Catamarans Ltd. now owns and makes two of the Prout designs, which still come standard with the mast-aft rig.

RB Power & Sailing of Thailand offers two aft-mast catamarans. Model "HK-40" is 40-ft long and model "HK-55" is 55-ft long. They were designed by Albert Nazarov.

Most aft-mast sailboats are either catamarans, or trimarans. An exception is the "4.8 monomaran" designed by Kees Radius's. A ""monomaran"" is a single hull with no ballast and a dagger board.

Commercially unsuccessful examples include the Delta 26 by Gary Hoyt and the CS-24 by Phil Bolger. Prototypes of both designs were constructed, but neither entered commercial production. Ted Brewer's So-Du-It, designed for amateur home construction, had at least two examples constructed, but the anticipated offshore racing class never materialized.

== Custom yacht examples ==
Shotover is a 60-ft long racing catamaran with a 31-ft beam designed by Lock Crowther and built for Sir Douglas Myer. This sailboat utilizes a mainsail and a small boom. For several years it held the fastest time in the Brisbane to Gladstone yacht race. The sailboat now shuttles tourists to the Monkey Mia resort area off Western Australia.

Hot Buoys is a 65-ft long cruising trimaran with a 40-ft beam. It was designed by Jay Kantola, and built by Richard and Kris Barrie of California. In 2010 it was converted by Philip Maise to an aft-mast rig with a self-tacking crab-claw sail. Video in External Links

Warick Collins, experimental boat builder, and inventor of both the tandem keel and the universal hull, now uses an aft-mast rig. "I believe that in due course this will have wide applications for motor-sailers, commercial vessels and sail-assisted passage-making on larger vessels of different types.

"Lyra" is a catamaran built of polycore panels that by 2011 had logged over 7,000 miles. Ian Campbell reported it tacked and went to windward very well. With no boom to swing across, "accidental jibes are a ho hum event".
