= Prouty =

Prouty may refer to:

- George H. Prouty (1862–1918), U.S. politician
- Olive Higgins Prouty (1882–1974), U.S. novelist
- Winston L. Prouty (1906–1971), U.S. politician
- L. Fletcher Prouty (1917–2001), USAF colonel and writer
- Nada Nadim Prouty (born c. 1970), former US Government Intelligence Agent

== See also ==
- Prouty Place State Park
- Prout (disambiguation)
