= Russian rescue ship Kommuna =

Submarine rescue ship in the Russian Navy

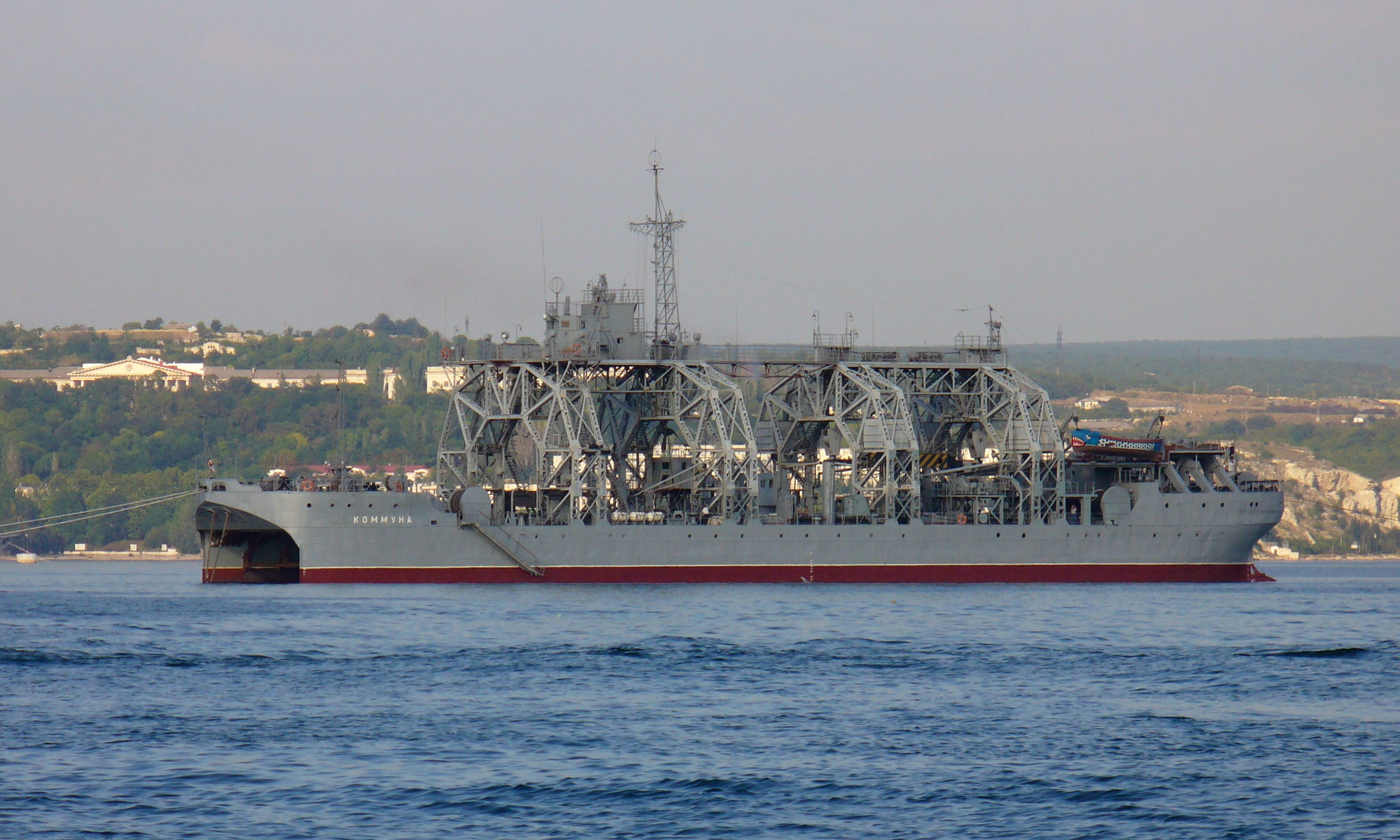
- Kommuna at Sevastopol in 2008

History

→ → Russian Empire → Soviet Union → Russia
- Name: Kommuna
- Ordered: 30 December 1911
- Awarded: 5 May 1912
- Builder: Putilov Company, St. Petersburg
- Laid down: 12 November 1912
- Launched: 17 November 1913
- Commissioned: 14 July 1915
- Status: Active

General characteristics (as built)
- Type: Submarine rescue ship
- Displacement: 3,100 long tons (3,100 t) full load
- Length: 96 m (315 ft 0 in) o/a
- Beam: 18.57 m (60 ft 11 in)
- Draught: 3.65 m (12 ft 0 in)
- Depth: 8.4 m (27 ft 7 in)
- Propulsion: 2 × Felser 6-cylinder diesel engines, 600 hp (447 kW)
- Speed: 10 kn (19 km/h)
- Complement: 99

Kommuna is a submarine rescue ship in service with the Russian Navy's Black Sea Fleet and the world's oldest active duty naval vessel (apart from ceremonial or museum ships).

A catamaran, she was laid down at the Putilov Factory (now Kirov Factory) in St. Petersburg in November 1912 as Volkhov. The ship was launched the following year, and commissioned on 14 July 1915. She was renamed Kommuna on 31 December 1922. Prior to 1974, the ship focused on salvage and submarine tending and had no submarine rescue capabilities.

Kommuna served in the Russian Imperial, Soviet, and Russian Federation navies through the Russian Revolution, two World Wars, the Cold War, and the Russian invasion of Ukraine.

== History ==
The ship was the first Russian twin-hulled vessel, and was developed by order of the Naval General Staff. The German ship SMS Vulkan (1907) was used as the model.

=== Imperial Russian Navy ===
The contract to build the ship was won by the Putilov company, who received Order No. 3559 from the General Directorate of Shipbuilding on 30 December 1911, and the contract for construction was signed on 5 May 1912. The ship was laid down in the Putilov works on 12 November 1912 under the supervision of naval architect N.V. Lesnikov. On 17 November 1913 the ship was launched under the name Volkhov, and was commissioned into the Baltic Fleet of the Imperial Russian Navy on 15 July 1915.

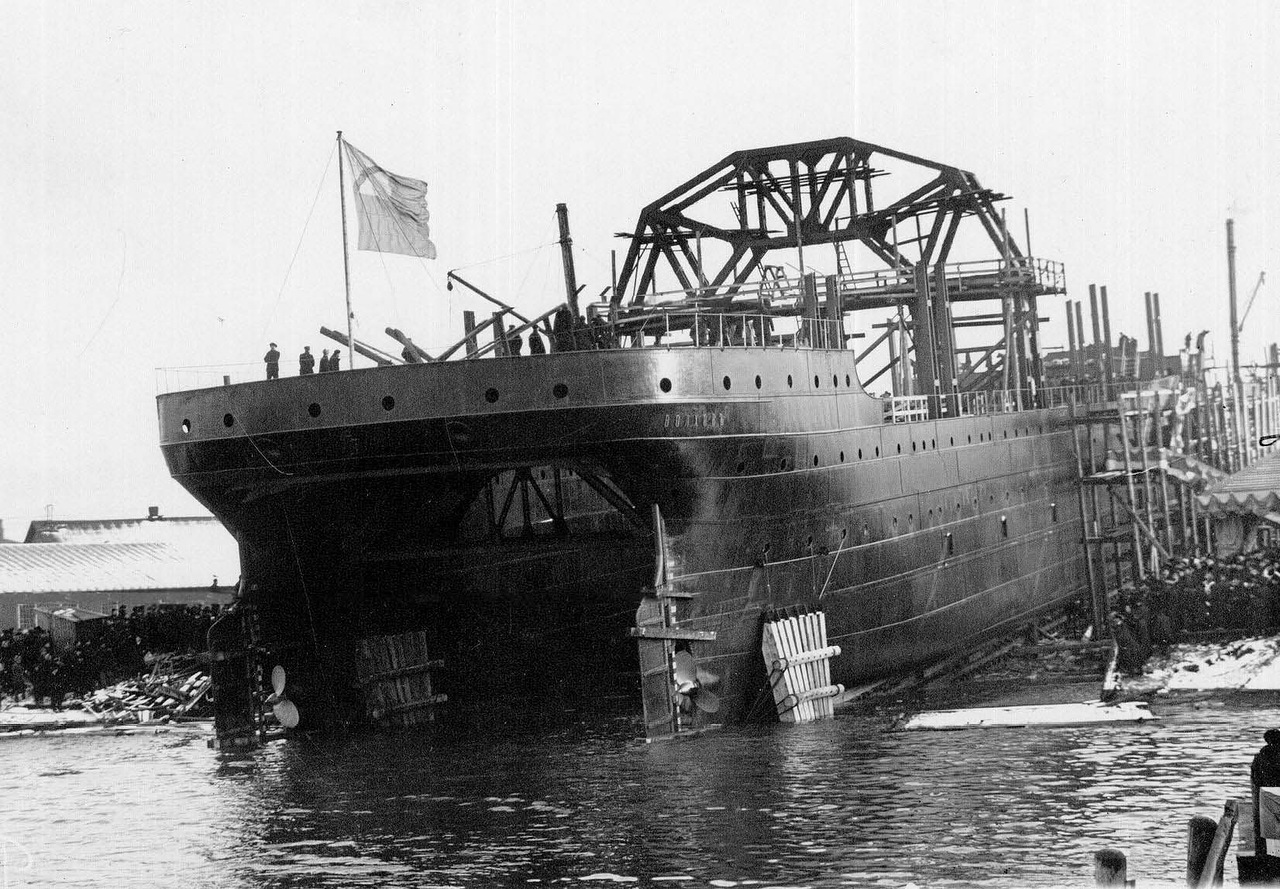
Launch of Volkhov at Saint Petersburg on 17 November 1913

Volkhov was initially based at Reval where she served as a submarine tender, capable of carrying 10 spare torpedoes and 50 tons of fuel, as well as accommodation for 60 submariners. She serviced Russian submarines, and also British E and C-class submarines.

Volkhov made her first successful salvage of a submarine in the summer of 1917, raising the American Holland-class submarine AG 15, which had sunk off Åland. On 24 September 1917, Volkhov refloated the Bars-class submarine Edinorog from a depth of 13.5 metres (44 ft). From late 1917 Volkhov participated in the Russian Civil War, serving the submarines of the Russian Baltic Fleet.

=== Soviet Navy ===
On 31 December 1922 (just days after the founding of the USSR) she was renamed Kommuna in the Soviet Navy. Under her new name she continued in service in the Baltic, extinguishing a fire aboard the submarine Zmeya, and raising the despatch boat Kobchik, and the boat Krasnoarmeyets. In mid-1928 Kommuna raised the British submarine HMS L55, which had been sunk in the Gulf of Finland in June 1919, from a depth of 62 metres (203 ft), and which then served as the prototype for the Leninets class. Kommuna continued to serve as a salvage and repair ship, also raising a tug, a torpedo boat, and a crashed aircraft.

Following the German invasion in June 1941 Kommuna was based at Leningrad and, although damaged by bombing, continued to serve throughout the siege of Leningrad. In March 1942 she recovered four KV tanks, two tractors and 31 vehicles from Lake Ladoga, which had fallen through the ice road, called the "Road of Life", which was Leningrad's only supply route. That year she also repaired six M-class submarines, as well as salvaging the Shchuka class 411, the tugboat Austra, the schooners Trud and Vodoley-2, and several other vessels. In February 1943, the crew of Kommuna were sent to the Volga River where they recovered the tugboat Ivan and an Ilyushin Il-2 aircraft. In 1944, Kommuna recovered 14 wrecks, totalling 11,767 tons, and repaired 34 ships. Following the end of the siege the entire crew were awarded the Medal "For the Defence of Leningrad". The ship continued to serve after the war, and in 1954 she was refitted and her engines were replaced by more modern Dutch ones. In November 1956 she located the submarine M-200, and in October 1957 raised the M-256.

In 1967, the ship sailed from the Baltic to the Black Sea, and was refitted at a cost of 11 million rubles to carry submersibles. In 1974 she was equipped with a Type AS-6 Poisk-2 submersible, which on 15 December 1974 made a record dive to a depth of 2,026 metres (6,647 ft). In 1977 it was used in the search for a Sukhoi Su-24 aircraft that crashed and sank off the Caucasus region at a depth of 1,700 metres (5,600 ft).

In 1974, Kommuna underwent modernization to serve the Soviet Navy as a Deep Submergence Rescue Vehicle (DSRV) mothership, and could handle a 50-ton submersible able to conduct rescues of up to 20 submariners per descent.

In 1984 the ship was laid up for transfer to the Russian Academy of Sciences and the crew was removed from the ship. She was at one point of time looted, and the Academy refused to take on responsibility for the ship. Remaining under the auspices of the navy, a retired naval captain was assigned to the vessel, overseeing her restoration from April 1985.

=== Russian Federation Navy ===
After the dissolution of the Soviet Union in 1993, Kommuna came into the possession of the Russian Federation Navy.

In 1999 she was re-designated from "salvage ship" to "rescue ship".

In October 2009 she received the British-built submarine rescue submersible Pantera Plus, capable of operating to depths of up to 1,000 metres (3,300 ft). As of January 2012 she formed part of the detachment of rescue vessels based at Sevastopol.

In April 2022, during the Russian invasion of Ukraine, the ship was deployed after the sinking of the guided missile cruiser Moskva. The Moskva sank 80 miles (130 km) off the coast from Odesa in 45 to 50 metres (148 to 164 ft) of water. The size of the Moskva, which sank in one piece, makes bringing it to the surface impractical. Kommuna reportedly assisted in recovering weapons, bodies, and other sensitive material that foreign powers might be interested in.

On 21 April 2024, Ukrainian sources claimed that the Ukrainian Navy had struck Kommuna with an R-360 Neptune missile while she was docked at the Port of Sevastopol. Russia's Black Sea Fleet had previously removed most of its warships from Sevastopol, out of the range of Ukrainian missiles, with Kommuna one of the few remaining. The governor of Sevastopol reported that an anti-ship missile had been repelled in Sevastopol and that "fragments caused a small fire, which was quickly extinguished". Subsequent satellite images did not reveal any damage.
