= SM U-3 (Germany) =

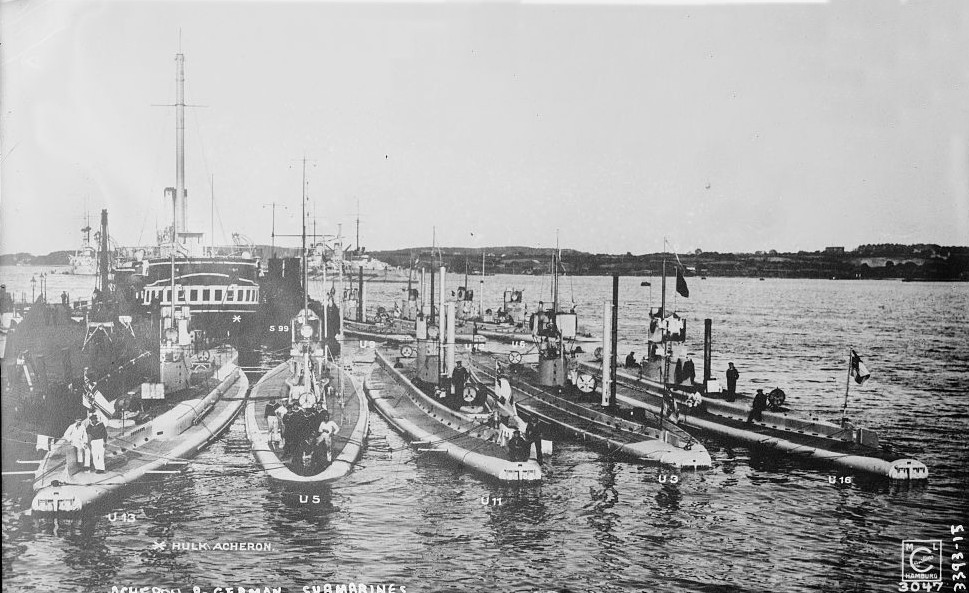
- SM U-3 in the Harbour of Kiel (second boat right)

History

German Empire
- Name: U-3
- Ordered: 13 August 1907
- Builder: Kaiserliche Werft Danzig
- Cost: 1,629,000 Goldmark
- Yard number: 2
- Launched: 27 March 1909
- Commissioned: 29 May 1909
- Fate: Surrendered on 1 December 1918. Sank on the way to be broken up at Preston.

General characteristics
- Type: Type U 3 submarine
- Displacement: 421 t (414 long tons) surfaced; 510 t (500 long tons) submerged
- Length: 51.28 m (168 ft 3 in) (o/a); 45.00 m (147 ft 8 in) (pressure hull)
- Beam: 5.6 m (18 ft 4 in)
- Draught: 3.05 m (10 ft)
- Propulsion: 2 shafts; 2 × Körting 8-cylinder two stroke paraffin motors with 600 PS (440 kW; 590 shp); 2 × Siemens-Schuckert electric motors with 1,030 PS (760 kW; 1,020 shp); 550 rpm surfaced; 600 rpm submerged
- Speed: 11.8 knots (21.9 km/h; 13.6 mph) surfaced; 9.4 knots (17.4 km/h; 10.8 mph) submerged
- Range: 1,800 nmi (3,300 km; 2,100 mi) at 12 knots (22 km/h; 14 mph) surfaced; 50 nmi (93 km; 58 mi) at 5 knots (9.3 km/h; 5.8 mph)
- Test depth: 30 m (98 ft)
- Boats & landing craft carried: 1 dinghy
- Complement: 3 officers, 19 men
- Armament: 4 × torpedo tubes (2 bow, 2 stern); 6 × 45 cm (18 in) torpedoes; 1 × 5 cm (2.0 in) SK L/40 gun (from 1915)

Service record
- Part of: Training Flotilla; 1 August 1914 - 11 November 1918
- Operations: none
- Victories: No ships sunk or damaged

SM U-3 was the third German U-boat built by the Imperial German Navy. Launched in March 1909 and commissioned later in the year, the boat was the first of two submarines in its class. The boat was built by Kaiserliche Werft Danzig.

On 17 January 1911, U-3 sank in Heikendorfer Bay near Kiel harbour due to an open ventilation shaft valve. Its entire 30-man crew was rescued by SMS Vulkan via U-3's torpedo tube. Amongst the crewmen who were saved were Otto Weddigen, the later commander of U-9, and Paul Clarrendorf, the commander of U-boot-Abnahme-Kommando in Kiel which enlisted U-boat crews.

During World War I the boat was used for training and did not see active service. At the end of the war it was surrendered and was being towed to Preston to be broken up when she sank.

== Bibliography ==
- Gröner, Erich; Jung, Dieter; Maass, Martin (1991). U-boats and Mine Warfare Vessels. German Warships 1815–1945. Vol. 2. Translated by Thomas, Keith; Magowan, Rachel. London: Conway Maritime Press. ISBN 0-85177-593-4.
- Rössler, Eberhard (1985). Die deutschen U-Boote und ihre Werften: U-Bootbau bis Ende des 1. Weltkriegs, Konstruktionen für das Ausland und die Jahre 1935–1945 [The German Submarines and Their Shipyards: Submarine Construction Until the End of the First World War] (in German). Vol. I. Koblenz: Bernard & Graefe. ISBN 3-7637-5213-7.
