= Catamaran =

Watercraft with two parallel hulls of equal size

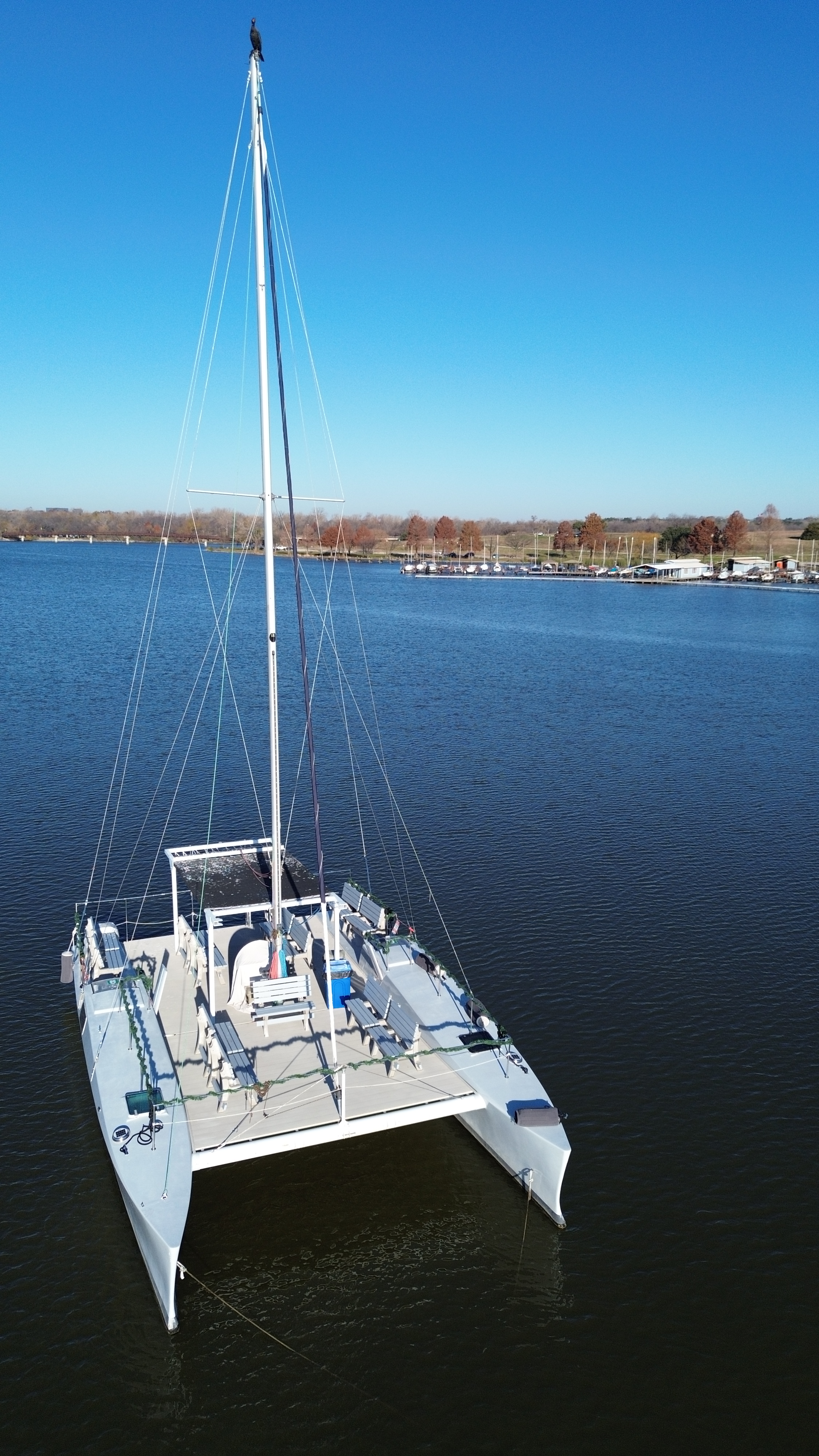
A dayboat catamaran for trippers, with no enclosure on the bridgedeck

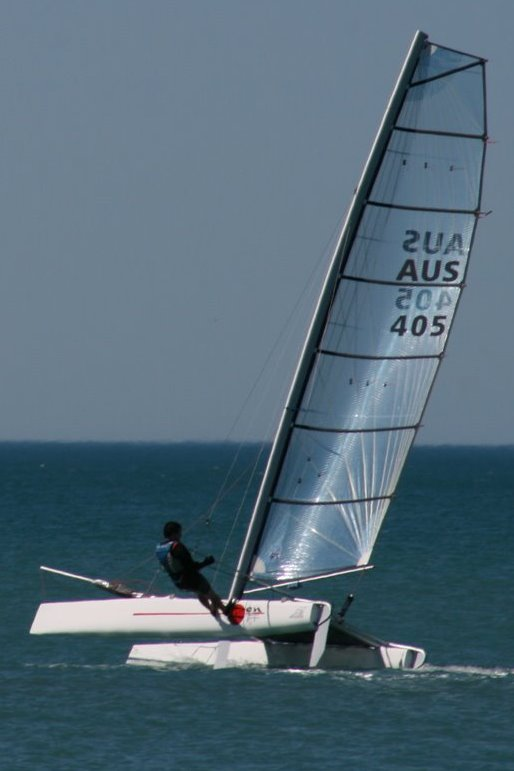
A Formula 16 beachable catamaran

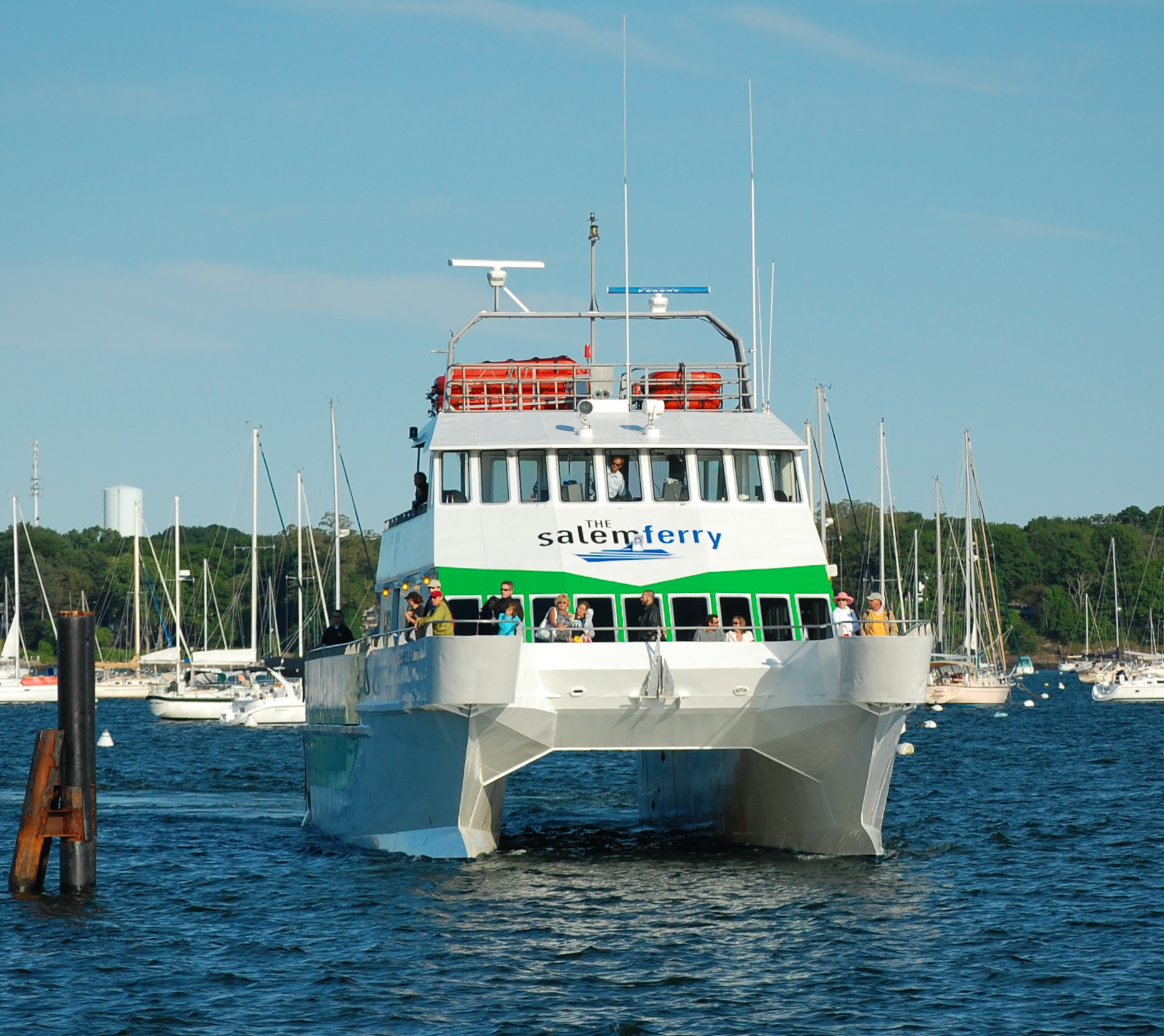
Powered catamaran passenger ferry at Salem, Massachusetts, United States

A catamaran (/ˌkætəməˈræn/) (informally, a "cat") is a watercraft with two parallel hulls of equal size. The wide distance between a catamaran's hulls imparts stability through resistance to rolling and overturning; no ballast is required. Catamarans typically have less hull volume, smaller displacement, and shallower draft (draught) than monohulls of comparable length. The two hulls combined also often have a smaller hydrodynamic resistance than comparable monohulls, requiring less propulsive power from either sails or motors. The catamaran's wider stance on the water can reduce both heeling and wave-induced motion, as compared with a monohull, and can give reduced wakes.

Catamarans were invented by the Austronesian peoples, and enabled their expansion to the islands of the Indian and Pacific Oceans.

Catamarans range in size from small sailing or rowing vessels to large naval ships and roll-on/roll-off car ferries. The structure connecting a catamaran's two hulls ranges from a simple frame strung with webbing to support the crew to a bridging superstructure incorporating extensive cabin or cargo space.

== History ==
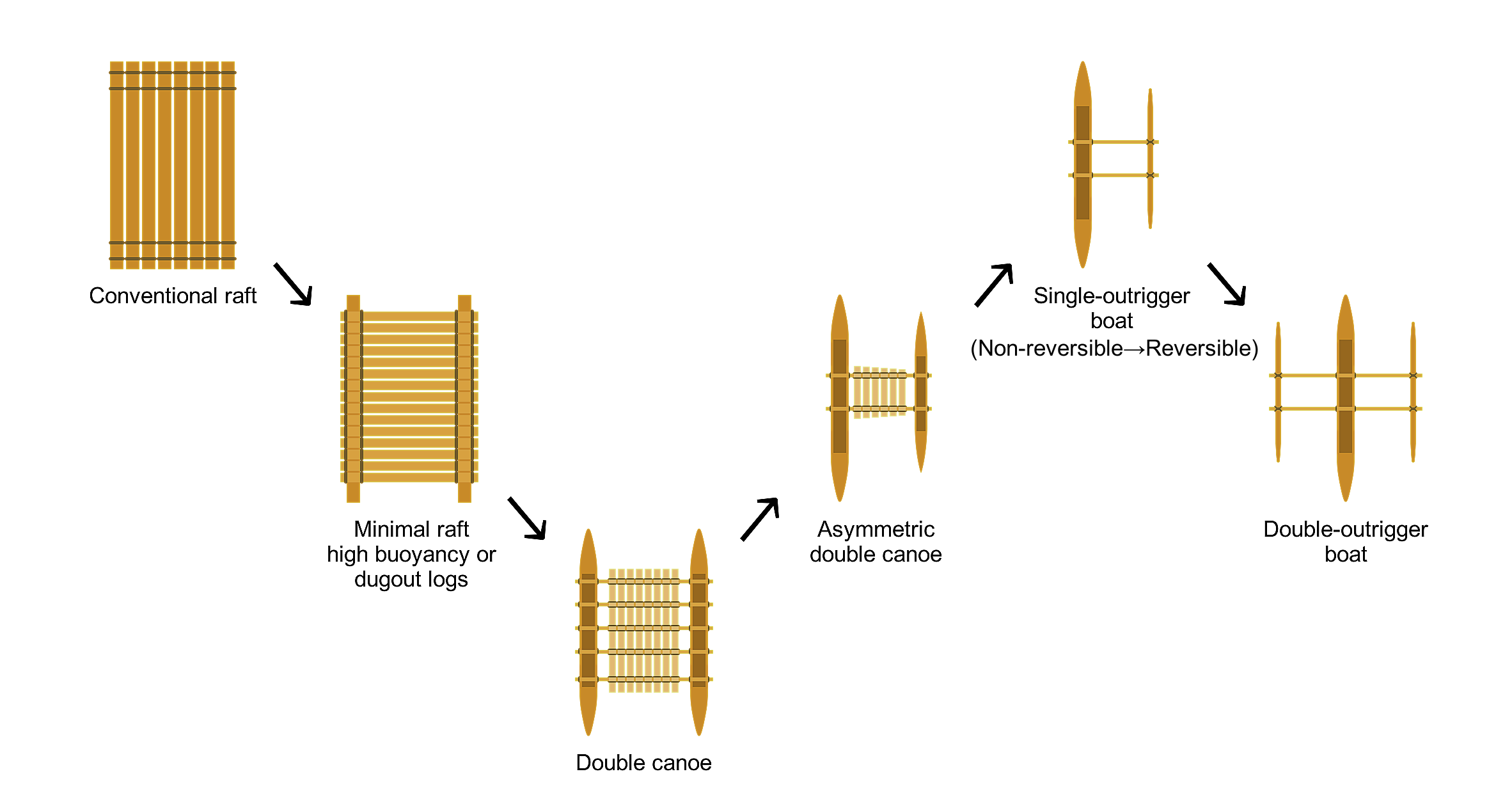
Succession of forms in the development of the Austronesian boat (Mahdi, 1999)

Catamarans from Oceania and Maritime Southeast Asia became the inspiration for modern catamarans. Until the 20th century catamaran development focused primarily on sail-driven concepts.

=== Etymology ===
The word "catamaran" is derived from the Tamil word, kattumaram (கட்டுமரம்), which means "logs bound together" and is a type of single-hulled raft made of three to seven tree trunks lashed together. The term has evolved in English usage to refer to unrelated twin-hulled vessels.

=== Development in Austronesia ===
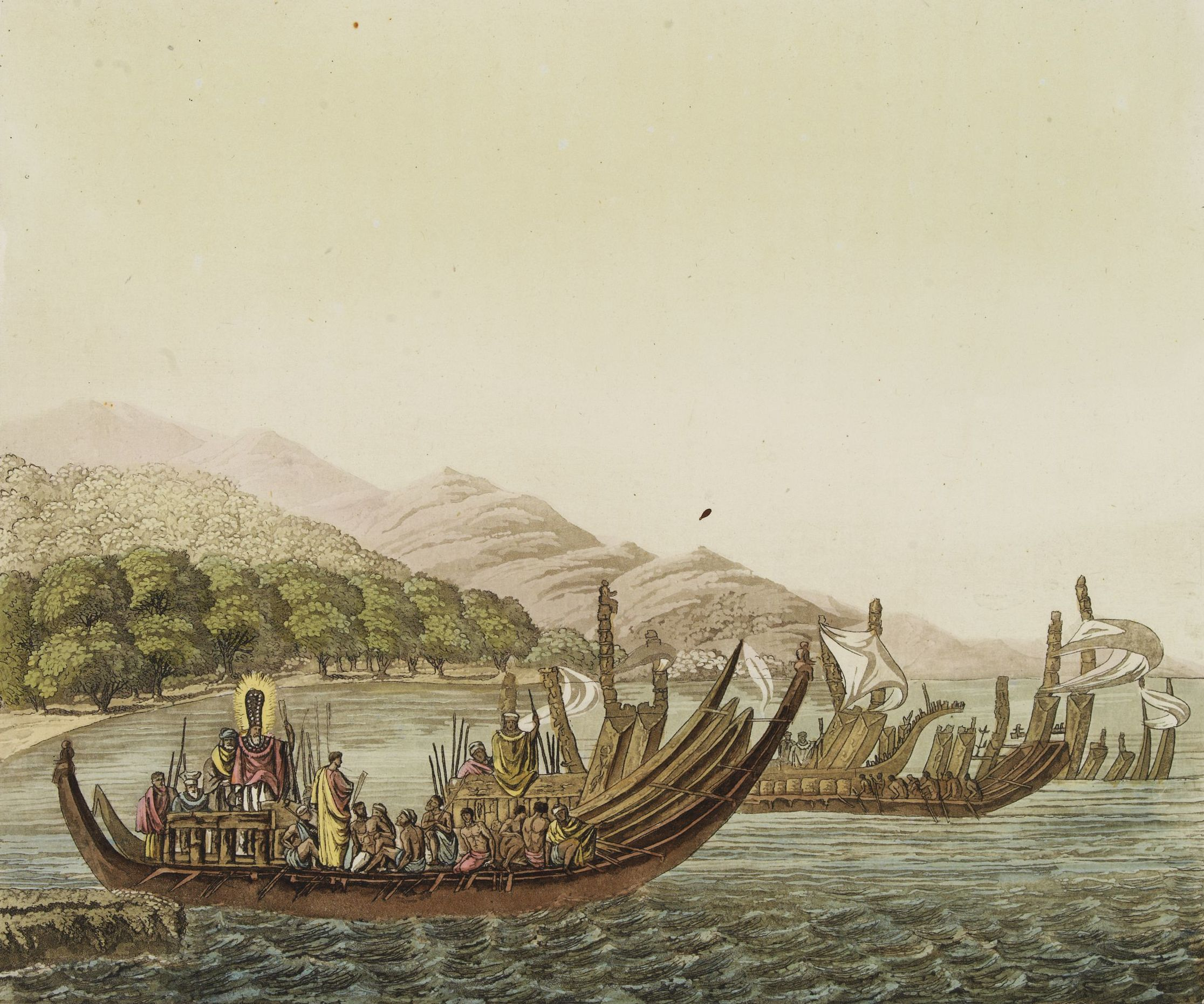
1827 depiction of Tahitian pahi war-canoes

Catamaran-type vessels were an early technology of the Austronesian peoples. Early researchers like Heine-Geldern (1932) and Hornell (1943) once believed that catamarans evolved from outrigger canoes, but modern authors specializing in Austronesian cultures like Doran (1981) and Mahdi (1988) now believe it to be the opposite.

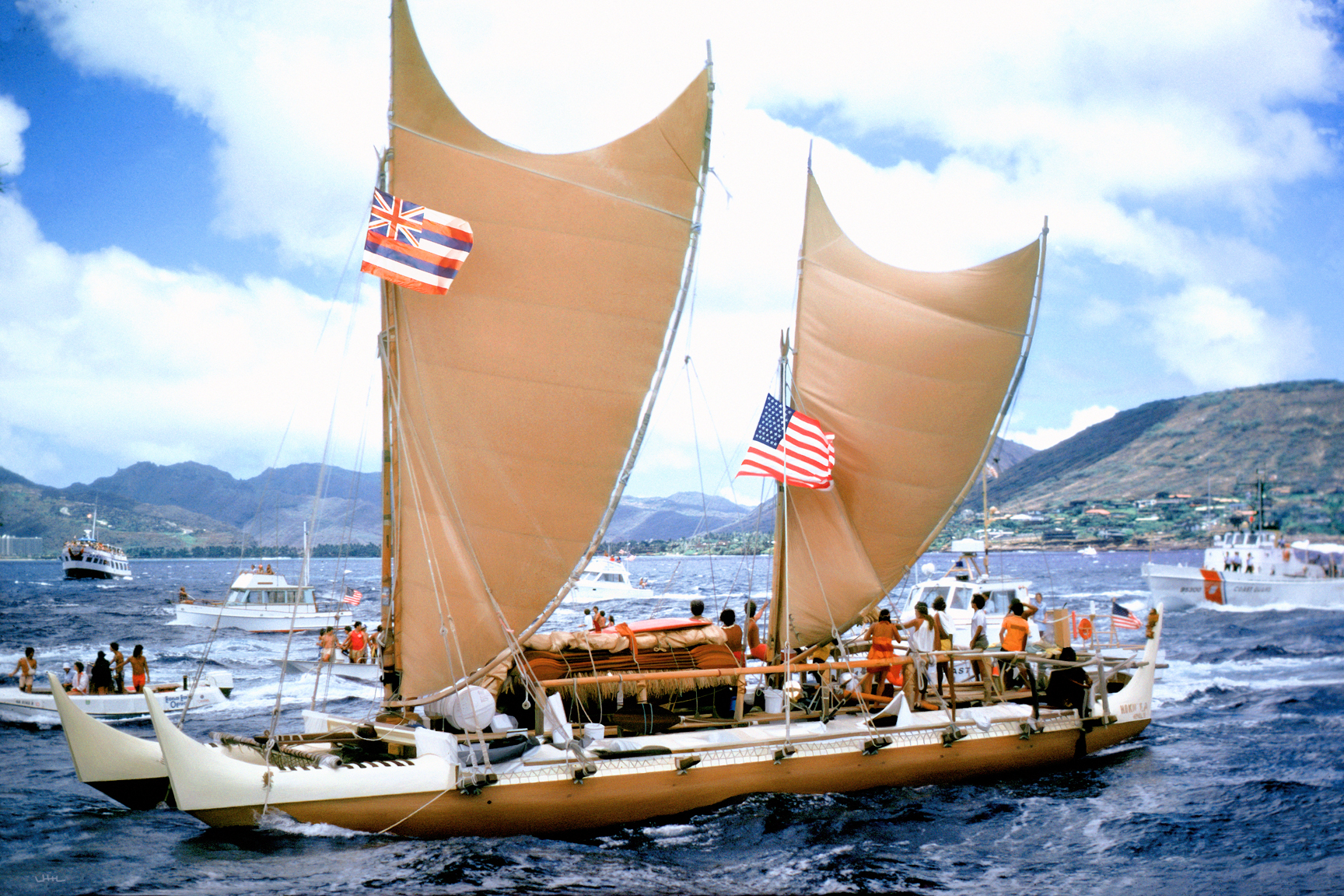
Hōkūleʻa, a modern replica of a Polynesian twin-hulled voyaging canoe—an Austronesian innovation

Two canoes bound together developed directly from minimal raft technologies of two logs tied together. Over time, the twin-hulled canoe form developed into the asymmetric double canoe, where one hull is smaller than the other. Eventually the smaller hull became the prototype outrigger, giving way to the single outrigger canoe, then to the reversible single outrigger canoe. Finally, the single outrigger types developed into the double outrigger canoe (or trimarans).

This would also explain why older Austronesian populations in Island Southeast Asia tend to favor double outrigger canoes, as it keeps the boats stable when tacking. But they still have small regions where catamarans and single-outrigger canoes are still used. In contrast, more distant outlying descendant populations in Oceania, Madagascar, and the Comoros, retained the twin-hull and the single outrigger canoe types, but the technology for double outriggers never reached them (although it exists in western Melanesia). To deal with the problem of the instability of the boat when the outrigger faces leeward when tacking, they instead developed the shunting technique in sailing, in conjunction with reversible single-outriggers.

Despite their being the more "primitive form" of outrigger canoes, they were nonetheless effective, allowing seafaring Polynesians to voyage to distant Pacific islands.

=== Traditional catamarans ===
The following is a list of traditional Austronesian catamarans:

- Island Melanesia:

- Fiji: Drua (or waqa tabu)
- Papua New Guinea: Lakatoi
- Tonga: Hamatafua, kalia, tongiaki

- Polynesia

- Cook Islands: Vaka katea
- Hawaii: Waʻa kaulua
- Marquesas: Vaka touʻua
- New Zealand: Waka hourua
- Samoa: ʻAlia, amatasi, va'a-tele
- Society Islands: Pahi, tipairua

=== Western development of sailing catamarans ===
The first documented example of twin-hulled sailing craft in Europe was designed by William Petty in 1662 to sail faster, in shallower waters, in lighter wind, and with fewer crew than other vessels of the time. However, the unusual design met with skepticism and was not a commercial success.

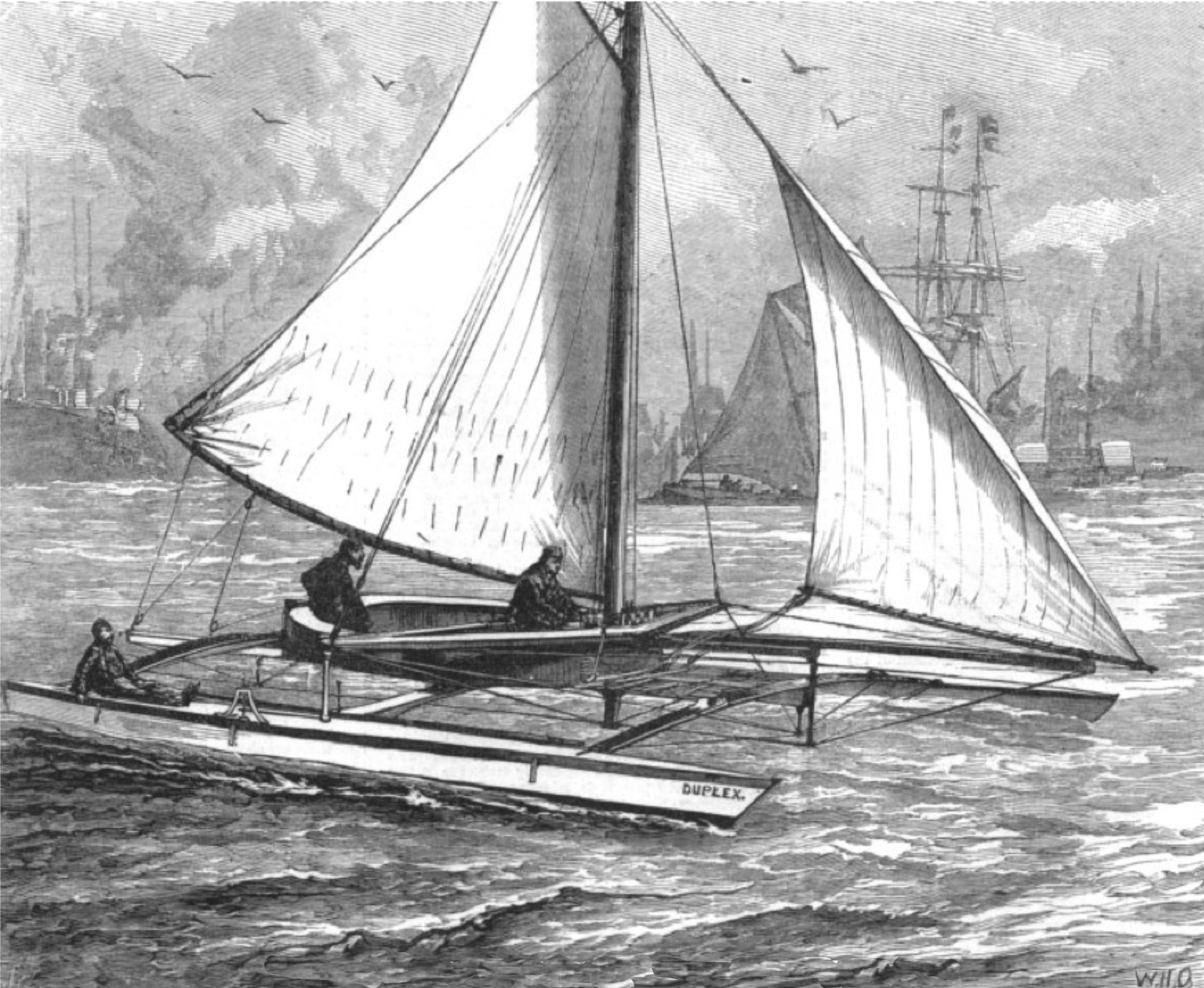
Nathaniel Herreshoff's 31 ft (9 m) long catamaran, Duplex, on the River Thames—built in 1877

The design remained relatively unused in the West for almost 160 years until the early 19th century, when the Englishman Mayflower F. Crisp built a two-hulled merchant ship in Rangoon, Burma. The ship was christened Original. Crisp described it as "a fast sailing fine sea boat; she traded during the monsoon between Rangoon and the Tenasserim Provinces for several years".

Later that century, the American Nathanael Herreshoff constructed a twin-hulled sailing boat of his own design (US Pat. No. 189,459). The craft, Amaryllis, raced at her maiden regatta on June 22, 1876, and performed exceedingly well. Her debut demonstrated the distinct performance advantages afforded to catamarans over the standard monohulls. It was as a result of this event, the Centennial Regatta of the New York Yacht Club, that catamarans were barred from regular sailing classes, and this remained the case until the 1970s. On June 6, 1882, three catamarans from the Southern Yacht Club of New Orleans raced a 15 nm course on Lake Pontchartrain and the winning boat in the catamaran class, Nip and Tuck, beat the fastest sloop's time by over five minutes.

In 1916, Leonardo Torres Quevedo patented a multihull steel vessel named Binave (Twin Ship), a new type of catamaran which was constructed and tested in Bilbao (Spain) in 1918. The innovative design introduced a flexible structural system to counteract sea-induced torsion, included two 30 HP Hispano-Suiza marine engines and could modify its configuration when sailing, positioning two rudders at the stern of each float, with the propellers also placed aft. In 1936, Eric de Bisschop built a Polynesian "double canoe" in Hawaii and sailed it home to a hero's welcome in France. In 1939, he published his experiences in a book, Kaimiloa, which was translated into English in 1940.

Roland and Francis Prout experimented with catamarans in 1949 and converted their 1935 boat factory in Canvey Island, Essex (England), to catamaran production in 1954. Their Shearwater catamarans easily won races against monohulls. Yellow Bird, a 1956-built Shearwater III, raced successfully by Francis Prout in the 1960s, is in the collection of the National Maritime Museum Cornwall. Prout Catamarans, Ltd. designed a mast aft rig with the mast aft of midships to support an enlarged jib—more than twice the size of the design's reduced mainsail; it was produced as the Snowgoose model. The claimed advantage of this sail plan was to diminish any tendency for the bows of the vessel to dig in.

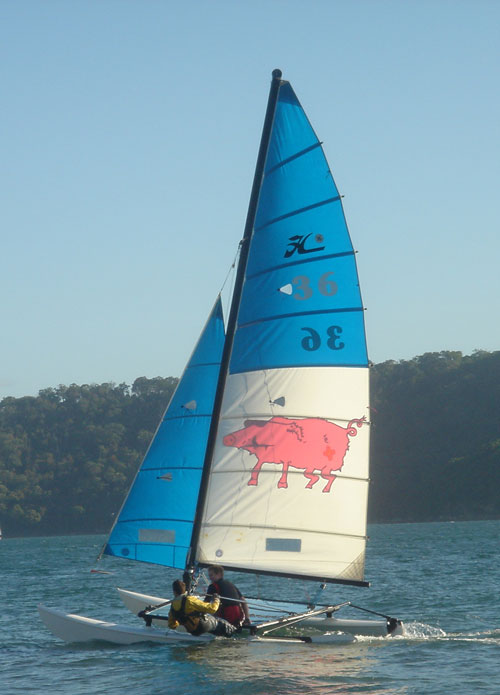
Hobie 16 beachable catamaran

In the mid-twentieth century, beachcats became a widespread category of sailing catamarans, owing to their ease of launching and mass production. In California, a maker of surfboards, Hobie Alter, produced the 250-pound (110 kg) Hobie 14 in 1967, and two years later the larger and even more successful Hobie 16. As of 2016, the Hobie 16 was still being produced with more than 100,000 having been manufactured.

Catamarans were introduced to Olympic sailing in 1976. The two-handed Tornado catamaran was selected for the multihull discipline in the Olympic Games from 1976 through 2008. It was redesigned in 2000. The foiling Nacra 17 was used in the Tokyo 2020 Olympics, which were held in 2021; after the 2015 adoption of the Nacra 15 as a Youth World Championships class and as a new class for the Youth Olympic Games.

== Performance ==
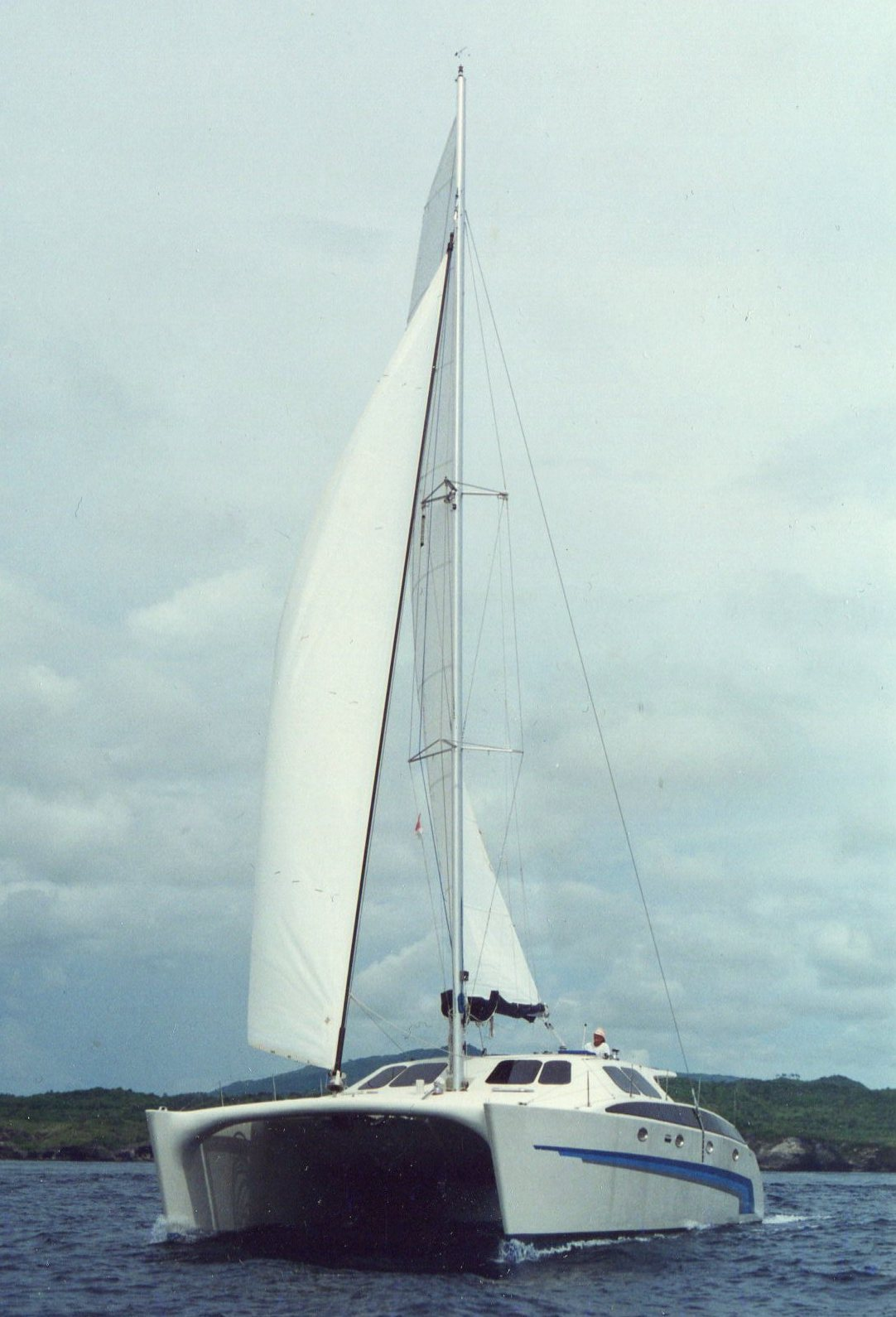
A 45' catamaran under sail, showing minimal bow wave and wake resulting from the hulls being narrow, low displacement and long

Catamarans have two distinct primary performance characteristics that distinguish them from displacement monohull vessels: lower resistance to passage through the water and greater stability (initial resistance to capsize). Choosing between a monohull and catamaran configuration includes considerations of carrying capacity, speed, and efficiency.

=== Resistance ===
At low to moderate speeds, a lightweight catamaran hull experiences resistance to passage through water that is approximately proportional to its speed. A displacement monohull has the same relationship at low speed since resistance is almost entirely due to surface friction. When boat speed increases and waves are generated the resistance is dependent on several design factors, particularly hull displacement to length and hull separation to length ratio, it is a non trivial resistance curve with many small peaks as wave trains at various speeds combine and cancel. For powered catamarans, this implies smaller power plants (although two are typically required). For sailing catamarans, low forward resistance allows the sails to derive power from attached flow, their most efficient mode—analogous to a wing—leading to the use of wingsails in racing craft.

=== Stability ===
Catamarans rely primarily on form stability to resist heeling and capsize. Comparison of heeling stability of a rectangular-cross section monohull of beam, B, compared with two catamaran hulls of width B/2, separated by a distance, 2×B, determines that the catamaran has an initial resistance to heeling that is seven times that of the monohull. Compared with a monohull, a cruising catamaran sailboat has a high initial resistance to heeling and capsize—a fifty-footer requires four times the force to initiate a capsize than an equivalent monohull.

=== Tradeoffs ===
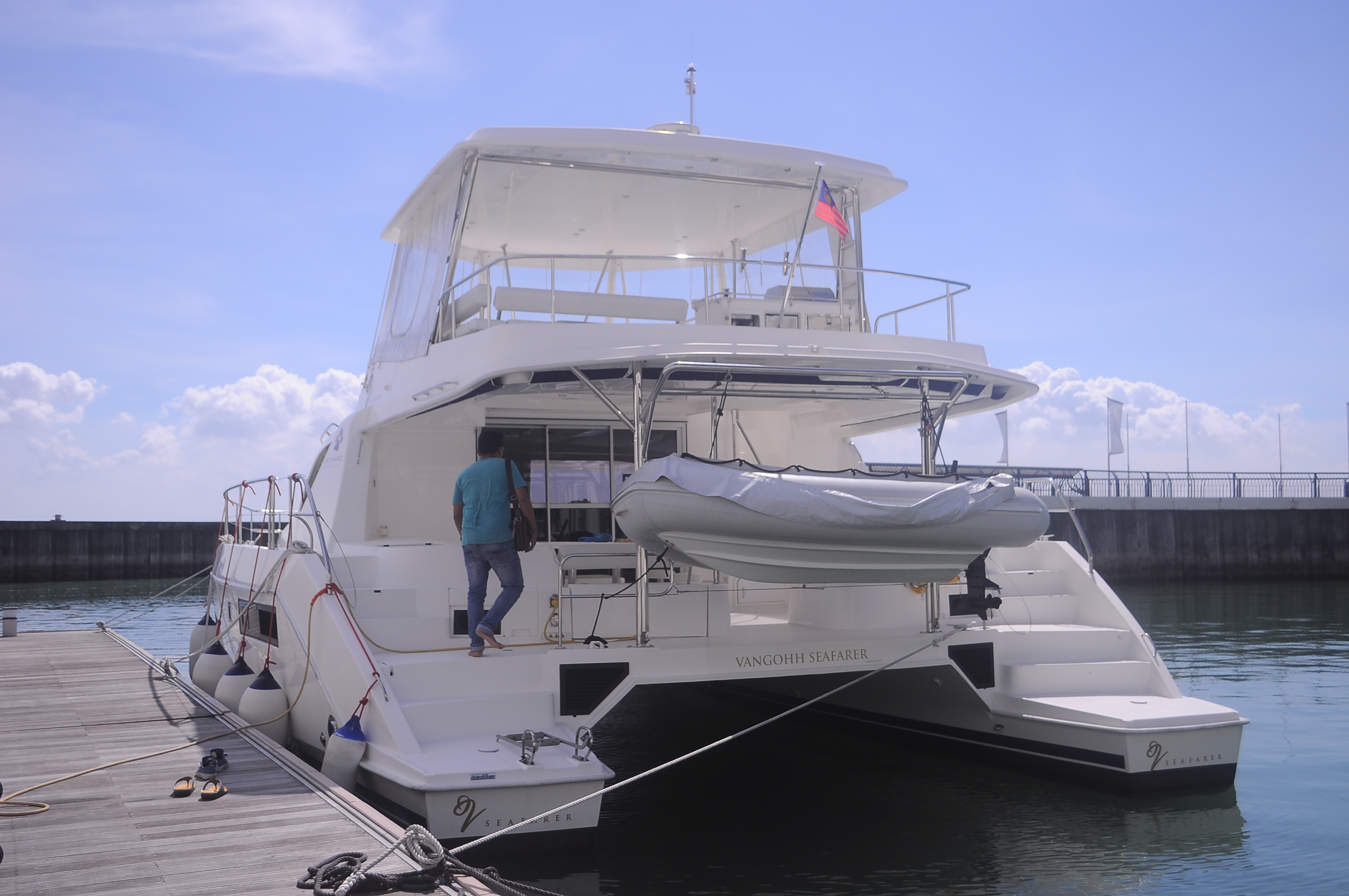
A cruising motor catamaran

One measure of the trade-off between speed and carrying capacity is the displacement Froude number (Fn_{V}), compared with calm water transportation efficiency. Fn_{V} applies when the waterline length is too speed-dependent to be meaningful—as with a planing hull. It uses a reference length, the cubic root of the volumetric displacement of the hull, V, where u is the relative flow velocity between the sea and ship, and g is acceleration due to gravity:

$$\mathrm{Fn_V} = \frac{u}{\sqrt{gV^{1/3}}}$$

Calm water transportation efficiency of a vessel is proportional to the full-load displacement and the maximum calm-water speed, divided by the corresponding power required.

Large merchant vessels have a Fn_{V} between one and zero, whereas higher-performance powered catamarans may approach 2.5, denoting a higher speed per unit volume for catamarans. Each type of vessel has a corresponding calm water transportation efficiency, with large transport ships being in the range of 100–1,000, compared with 11-18 for transport catamarans, denoting a higher efficiency per unit of payload for monohulls.

== SWATH and wave-piercing designs ==
A SWATH ship has twin hulls (blue) that remain completely submerged.

Two advances over the traditional catamaran are the small-waterplane-area twin hull (SWATH) and the wave-piercing configuration—the latter having become a widely favored design.

SWATH reduces wave-generating resistance by moving displacement volume below the waterline, using a pair of tubular, submarine-like hulls, connected by pylons to the bridge deck with a narrow waterline cross-section. The submerged hulls are minimally affected by waves. The SWATH form was invented by Canadian Frederick G. Creed, who presented his idea in 1938 and was later awarded a British patent for it in 1946. It was first used in the 1960s and 1970s as an evolution of catamaran design for use as oceanographic research vessels or submarine rescue ships. In 1990, the US Navy commissioned the construction of a SWATH ship to test the configuration.

SWATH vessels compare with conventional powered catamarans of equivalent size, as follows:

- Larger wetted surface, which causes higher skin friction drag
- Significant reduction in wave-induced drag, with the configuration of struts and submerged hull structures
- Lower water plane area significantly reduces pitching and heaving in a seaway
- No possibility of planing
- Higher sensitivity to loading, which may bring the bridge structure closer to the water

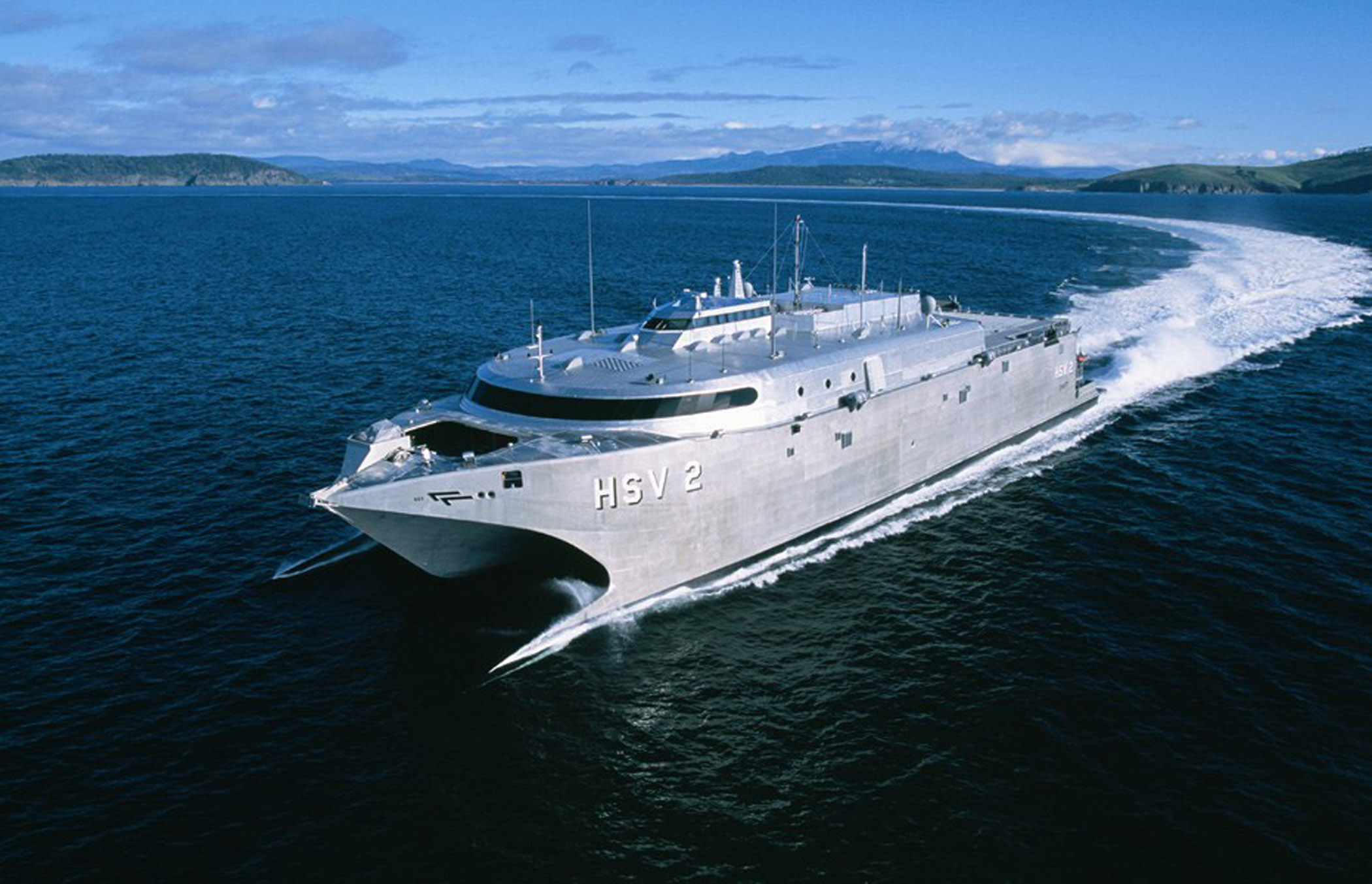
HSV-2 Swift, a wave-piercing catamaran, built by Incat in Tasmania, Australia

Wave-piercing catamarans (strictly speaking they are trimarans, with a central hull and two outriggers) employ a low-buoyancy bow on each hull that is pointed at the water line and rises aft, up to a level, to allow each hull to pierce waves, rather than ride over them. This allows higher speeds through waves than for a conventional catamaran. They are distinguished from SWATH catamarans, in that the buoyant part of the hull is not tubular. The spanning bridge deck may be configured with some of the characteristics of a normal V-hull, which allows it to penetrate the crests of waves.

Wave-piercing catamaran designs have been employed for yachts, passenger ferries, and military vessels.

== Applications ==
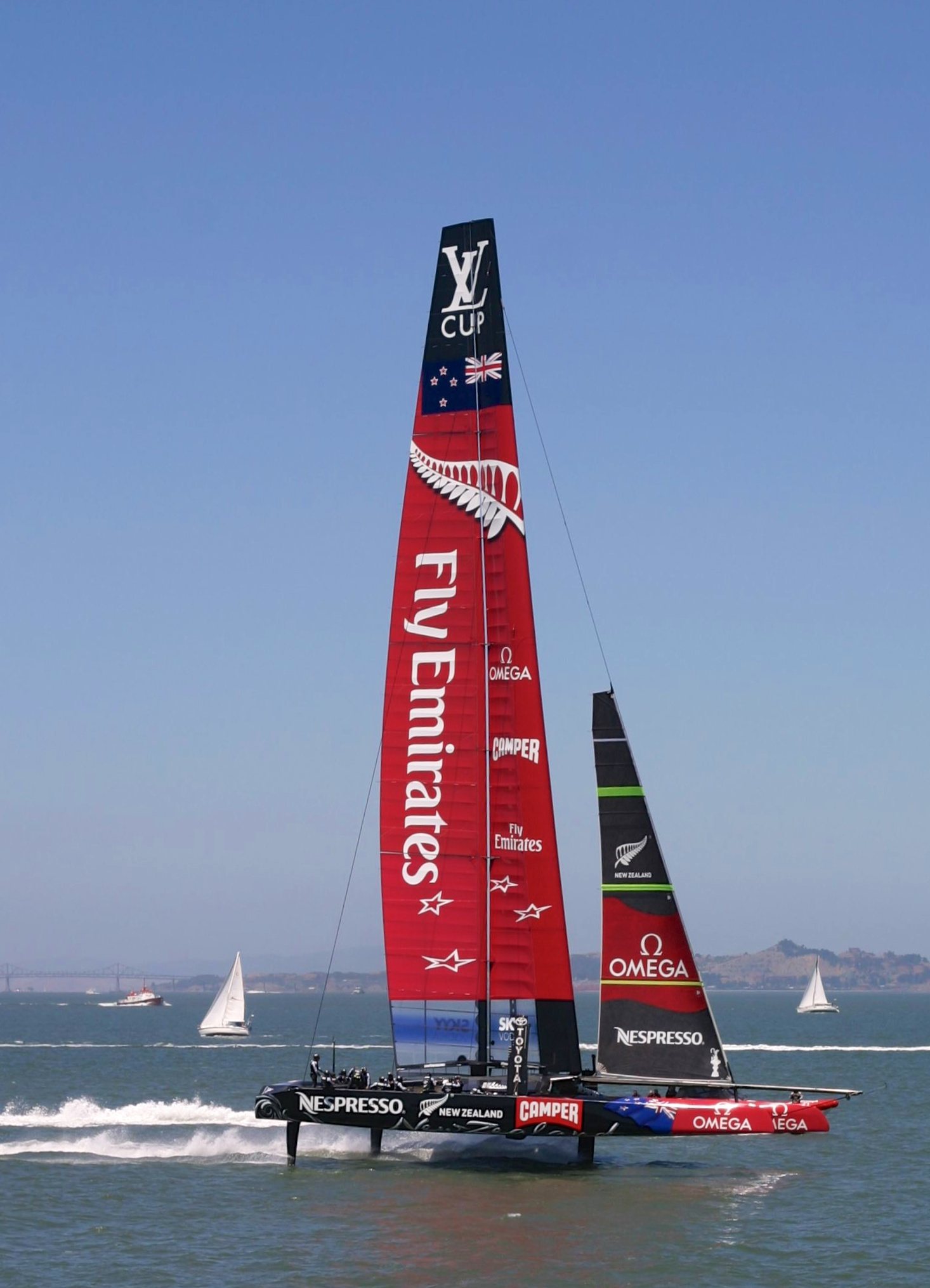
Emirates Team New Zealand's AC72 Aotearoa on foils in San Francisco Bay

A catamaran configuration fills a niche where speed and sea-kindliness is favored over bulk capacity. In larger vessels, this niche favors car ferries and military vessels for patrol or operation in the littoral zone.

=== Sport ===
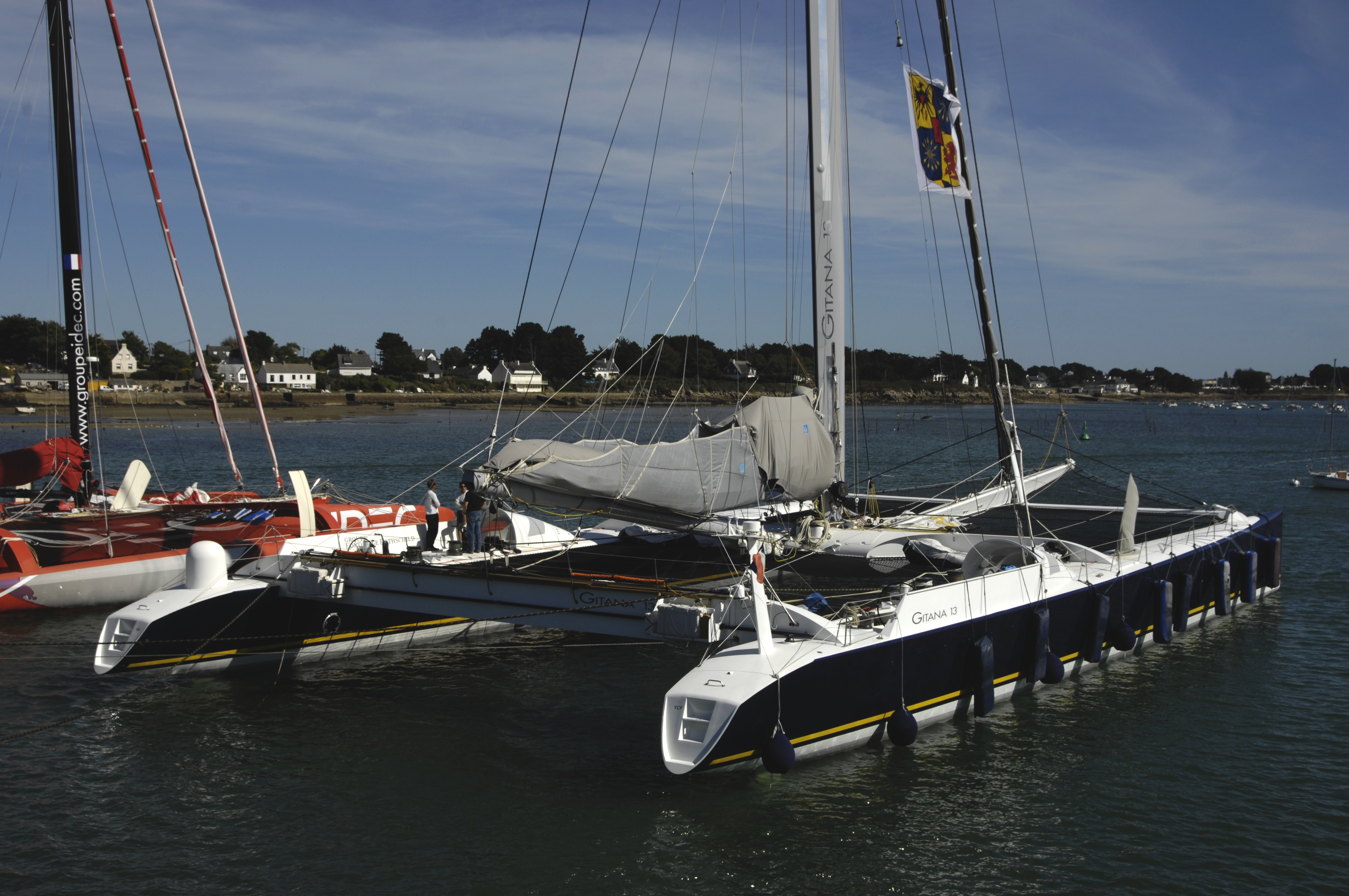
Gitana 13, an ocean-racing catamaran

Recreational and sport catamarans typically are designed to have a crew of two and be launched and landed from a beach. Most have a trampoline on the bridging structure, a rotating mast and full-length battens on the mainsail. Performance versions often have trapezes to allow the crew to hike out and counterbalance capsize forces during strong winds on certain points of sail.

For the 33rd America's Cup, both the defender and the challenger built 90-foot (27 m) long multihulls. Société Nautique de Genève, defending with team Alinghi, sailed a catamaran. The challenger, BMW Oracle Racing, used a trimaran, replacing its soft sail rig with a towering wing sail—the largest sailing wing ever built. In the waters off Valencia, Spain in February 2010, the BMW Oracle Racing trimaran with its powerful wing sail proved to be superior. This represented a break from the traditional monohulls that had always been sailed in previous America's Cup series.

On San Francisco Bay, the 2013 America's Cup was sailed in 72-foot (22 m) long AC72 catamarans (craft set by the rules for the 2013 America's Cup). Each yacht employed hydrofoils and a wing sail. The regatta was won 9–8 by Oracle Team USA against the challenger, Emirates Team New Zealand, in fifteen matches because Oracle Team USA had started the regatta with a two-point penalty.

Yachting has seen the development of multihulls over 100 feet (30 m) in length. "The Race" helped precipitate this trend; it was a circumnavigation challenge which departed from Barcelona, Spain, on New Year's Eve, 2000. Because of the prize money and prestige associated with this event, four new catamarans (and two highly modified ones) over 100 feet (30 m) in length were built to compete. The largest, PlayStation, owned by Steve Fossett, was 125 feet (38 m) long and had a mast which was 147 feet (45 m) above the water. Virtually all of the new mega-cats were built of pre-preg carbon fiber for strength and the lowest possible weight. The top speeds of these boats can approach 50 knots (58 mph; 93 km/h). The Race was won by the 33.50 m (109.9 ft)-long catamaran Club Med skippered by Grant Dalton. It went round the globe in 62 days at an average speed of 18 knots (21 mph; 33 km/h).

=== Cruising ===
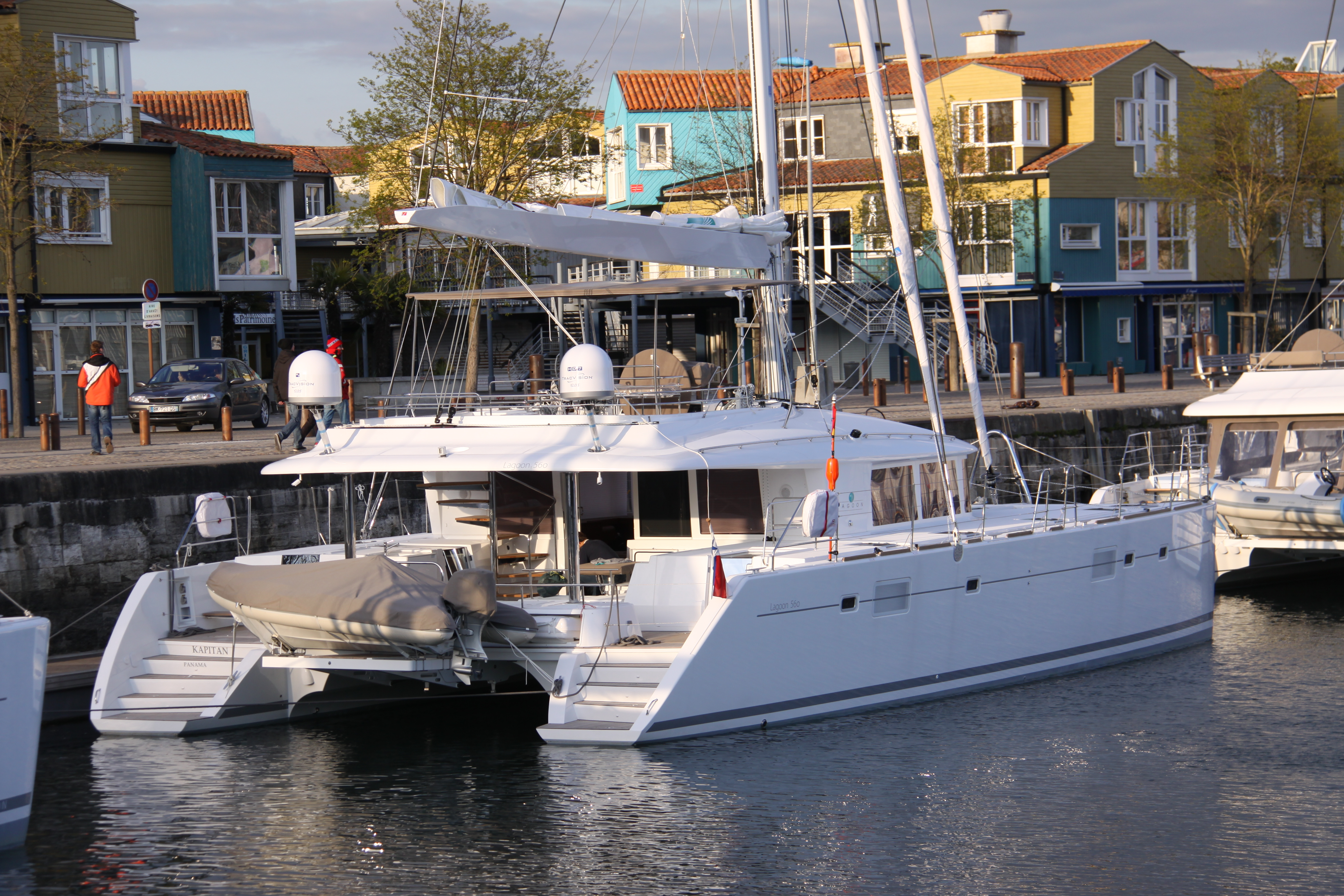
A Lagoon 560 cruising catamaran

Cruising sailors must make trade-offs among volume, useful load, speed, and cost in choosing a boat. Choosing a catamaran offers increased speed at the expense of reduced load per unit of cost. Howard and Doane describe the following tradeoffs between cruising monohulls and catamarans: A long-distance, offshore cruising monohull may be as short as 30 feet (9.1 m) for a given crew complement and supporting supplies, whereas a cruising catamaran would need to be 40 feet (12 m) to achieve the same capacity. In addition to greater speed, catamarans draw less water than do monohulls— as little as 3 feet (0.91 m) —and are easier to beach. Catamarans are harder to tack and take up more space in a marina. Cruising catamarans entail added expense for having two engines and two rudders. Tarjan adds that cruising catamarans boats can maintain a comfortable 300 nautical miles (350 mi; 560 km) per day passage, with the racing versions recording well over 400 nautical miles (460 mi; 740 km) per day. In addition, they do not heel more than 10-12 degrees, even at full speed on a reach.

Powered cruising catamarans share many of the amenities found in a sail cruising catamaran. The saloon typically spans two hulls wherein are found the staterooms and engine compartments. As with sailing catamarans, this configuration minimizes boat motion in a seaway.

The Swiss-registered wave-piercing catamaran, Tûranor PlanetSolar, which was launched in March 2010, is the world's largest solar powered boat. It completed a circumnavigation of the globe in 2012.

=== Passenger transport ===
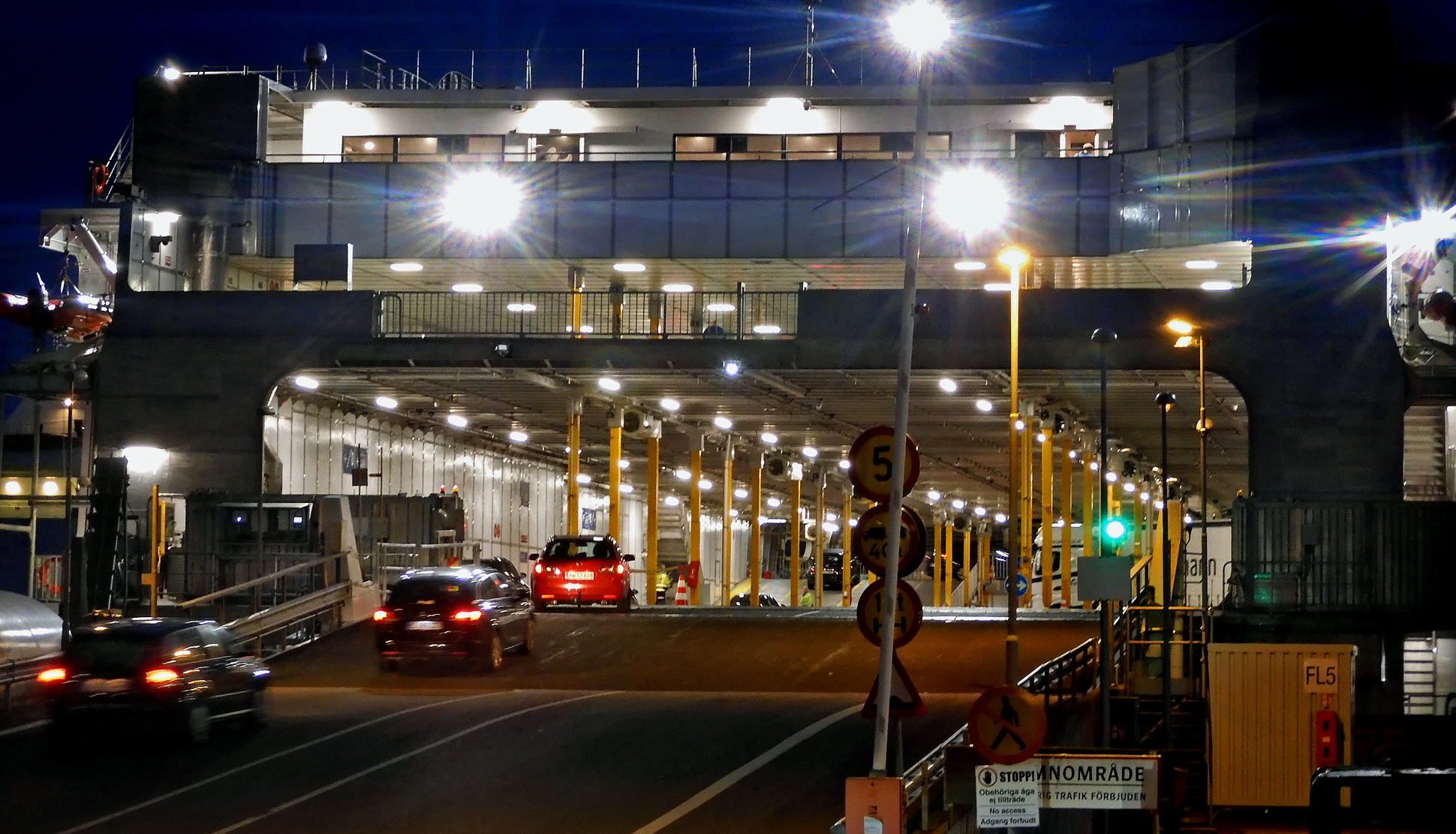
Drive-on, drive-off deck of a catamaran ferry boat

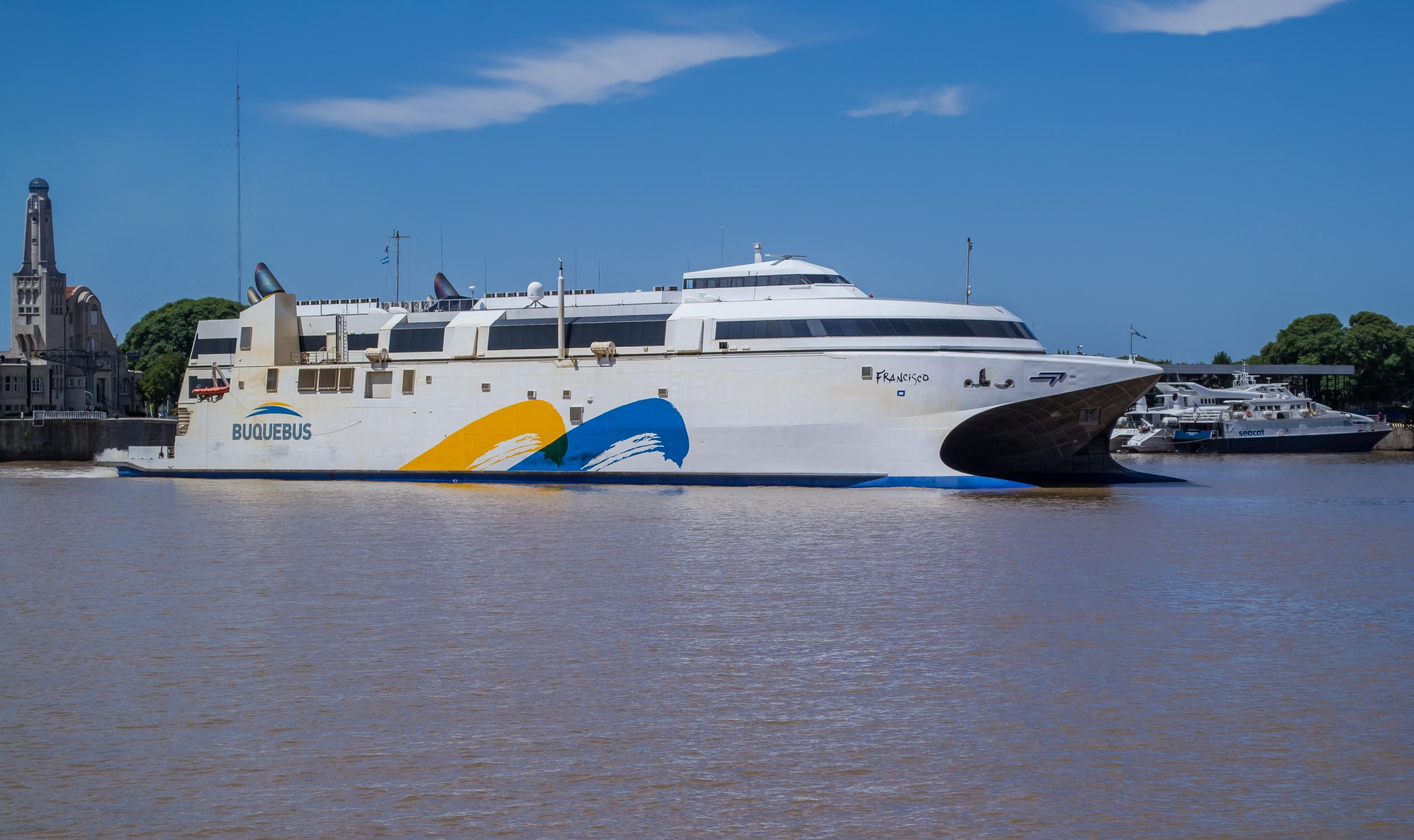
HSC Francisco, the world's fastest passenger ship

The 1970s saw the introduction of catamarans as high-speed ferries, as pioneered by Westermoen Hydrofoil in Mandal, Norway, which launched the Westamaran design in 1973. The Stena Voyager was an example of a large, fast ferry, typically traveling at a speed of 46 miles per hour (74 km/h), although it was capable of over 70 miles per hour (110 km/h).

The Australian island Tasmania became the site of builders of large transport catamarans—Incat in 1977 and Austal in 1988—each building civilian ferries and naval vessels. Incat built HSC Francisco, a High-Speed trimaran that, at 58 knots, is (as of 2014) the fastest passenger ship in service.

=== Military ===
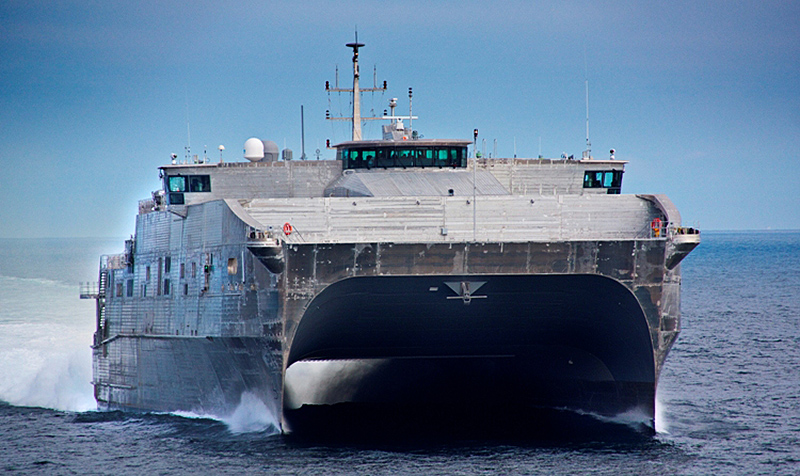
US Naval Ship Spearhead (JHSV-1) during sea trials in 2012

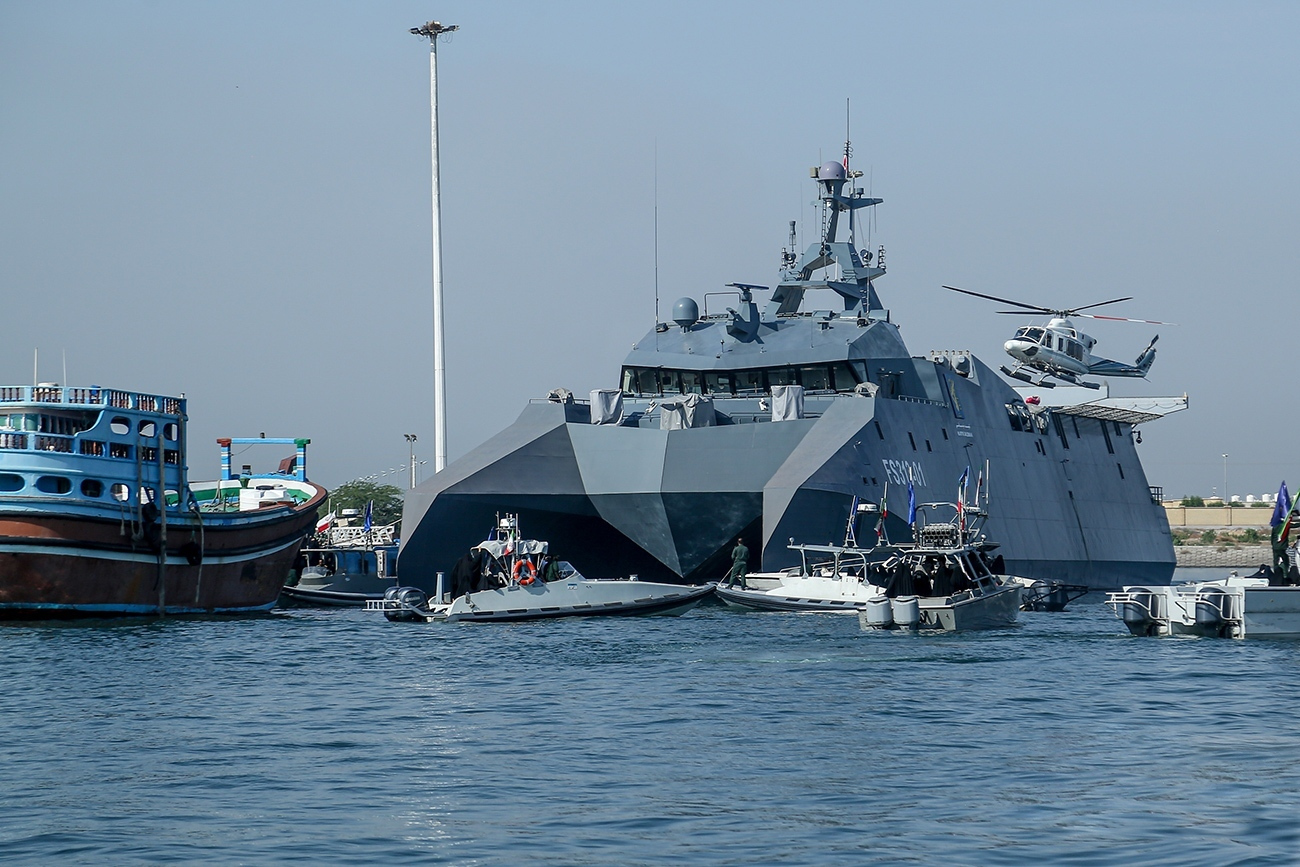
Iranian corvette Shahid Soleimani IRIS FS313-01 in 2023

The first warship to be propelled by a steam engine, named Demologos or Fulton and built in the United States during the War of 1812, was a catamaran with a paddle wheel between her hulls.

In the early 20th Century several catamarans were built as submarine salvage ships: SMS Vulkan and SMS Cyclop of Germany, Kommuna of Russia, and Kanguro of Spain, all designed to lift stricken submarines by means of huge cranes above a moon pool between the hulls. Two Cold War-era submarine rescue ships, USS Pigeon and USS Ortolan of the US Navy, were also catamarans, but did not have the moon pool feature.

The use of catamarans as high-speed naval transport was pioneered by HMAS Jervis Bay, which was in service with the Royal Australian Navy between 1999 and 2001. The US Military Sealift Command now operates several Expeditionary Fast Transport catamarans owned by the US Navy; they are used for high speed transport of military cargo, and to get into shallow ports.

The Makar-class is a class of two large catamaran-hull survey ships built for the Indian Navy. As of 2012, one vessel, INS Makar (J31), was in service and the second was under construction.

First launched in 2004 at Shanghai, the Houbei class missile boat of the People's Liberation Army Navy (PLAN) has a catamaran design to accommodate the vessel's stealth features.

The Tuo Chiang-class corvette is a class of Taiwanese-designed fast and stealthy multi-mission wave-piercing catamaran corvettes first launched in 2014 for the Republic of China (Taiwan) Navy.

=== Small, personal boats ===
The distribution of the boat's volume, namely its buoyancy away from its center-line increases its stability beyond the stability offered by mono-hulled vessels of similar size, and even bigger ones. Narrow beamed, personal twin-hulled boats designed for paddling (e.g. kayaks and canoes), and for powering by small portable motors (e.g. microskiffs, johnboats, and dinghies) in which the user/s and passenger/s ride a type of saddle seat similar to the seat featuring in Personal Watercraft (PWC) have been produced since 2004 in the United States by a company named Wavewalk.

== See also ==
- List of multihulls
- Multihull
- Pontoon boat
