= Shearwater III =

World's first production catamaran

Development
- Designer: Francis & Roland Prout
- Location: Canvey Island, Essex, UK
- Year: 1956
- No. built: 2000+
- Builders: Prout & Sons, Fairey Marine
- Name: Shearwater III

Boat
- Crew: 2
- Displacement: 120 kg (260 lb)
- Draft: 0.91 m (3.0 ft) min 0.18 m (0.59 ft) max
- Trapeze: Twin allowed

Hull
- General: 2
- Type: Catamaran Twin Centreboard
- Construction: Wood / Fibreglass / Composite / Carbon Fibre
- LOH: 5.03 m (16.5 ft)
- LWL: 4.82 m (15.8 ft)
- Beam: 2.29 m (7.5 ft)

Hull appendages
- Keel: Twin pivoting centreboards
- Rudder: Twin drop rudders

Rig
- General: Fractional Sloop (Rotating Spar)

Sails
- Sailplan: Bermudian Sloop
- Other sails: Spinnaker introduced 1972
- Upwind sail area: 14.86 m^{2} (160.0 sq ft)

The Shearwater III is a type of two crew racing catamaran, produced originally by G. Prout & Sons of Canvey Island, Essex, and was first sold in kit form. It is a "restricted development class". According to the UK's National Maritime Museum, The Shearwater III was the world’s first production catamaran.

Brothers Francis and Roland Prout were canoeists who took part in the 1952 Helsinki Olympics. They worked in the family firm G. Prout & Sons Ltd, with their father, making folding canoes and dinghies. They developed their first catamaran, the Shearwater I in the early 1950s. Initially, they experimentally lashed together two K1 kayaks and added a bamboo platform and a mast and sail, and after the success of this went on to build the Shearwater I, in which they participated in local regattas. They then developed the Shearwater III.

Shearwaters regularly field at least 15 entries at National Championships since 1998.
