= Frank Prout =

British canoeist (1921–2011)

Francis Prout (7 July 1921 Greenwich, Greater London, England – 23 February 2011 Woodbridge, Suffolk, England) was a British canoe sprinter who competed in the early 1950s. He was eliminated in the heats of the K-2 1000 m event at the 1952 Summer Olympics in Helsinki.

Francis moved to Canvey Island as an infant with his parents, Margueritte, a native of Switzerland, and Geoffrey Prout, a writer and boat builder. During World War II Prout served as airframe fitter with the RAF in southwest Asia and then went to Rhodesia where he became a flying instructor. After the War, he married Erica Hawks and had two children, Jane and Stephen. Together with his brother Roland Prout, in the family firm of G. Prout & Sons (founded in 1935 by their father, Geoffrey Prout), he developed the pioneering Shearwater III racing catamaran in 1956 and several later designs. He set a Guinness record for having the most title wins in a year.
