= Samuel T. Prout =

Liberian postmaster

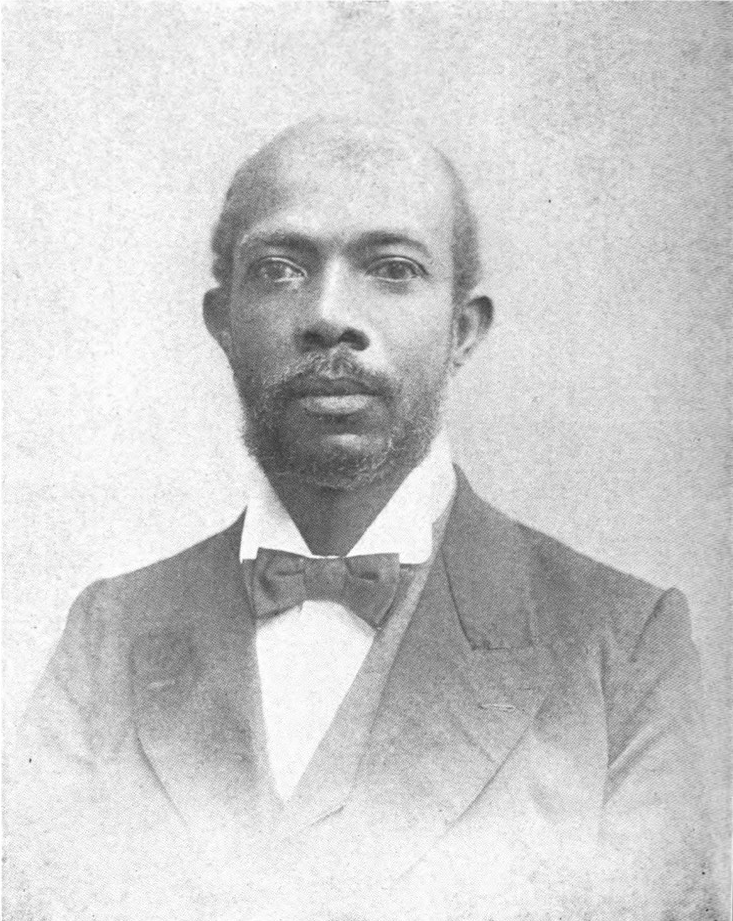

Postmaster General of Liberia
- In office 1901–1912
- President: Garretson W. Gibson; Arthur Barclay
- Preceded by: F. E. R. Johnson
- Succeeded by: Isaac Moort

Personal details
- Born: 21 October 1855 Monrovia, Liberia
- Education: Liberia College

Samuel T. Prout (born 21 October 1855) was Postmaster General of Liberia from 1901 to 1912.

== Biography ==
Samuel T. Prout was born in Monrovia on 21 October 1855 to American immigrants. His father was from Baltimore, Maryland and his mother was from Virginia. Prout was educated at Liberia College. In his youth, he trained as a printer.

In 1898, Prout became a Methodist pastor. He then worked as broker and general agent. In 1901, Prout was appointed by President Garretson W. Gibson as postmaster general. He continued to serve under President Arthur Barclay. Under Prout's administration over the postal service, in 1906, the seventh series of Liberian postage stamps were issued. Prout continued to serve as postmaster general until 1912.
