= Roland Prout =

British canoeist (1920–1997)

Roland Prout (1 March 1920 – 24 April 1997) was a British canoe sprinter who competed in the early 1950s. He was eliminated in the heats of the K-2 1000 m event at the 1952 Summer Olympics in Helsinki.

Together with his brother Francis Prout, in the family firm of G. Prout & Sons (founded in 1935 by their father, Geoffrey Prout), he developed the pioneering Shearwater III racing catamaran in 1956 and several later designs.
