= Richard Prout =

British entrepreneur (born 1967)

Richard A. Prout (born 1967) is a British entrepreneur.

Prout has a degree in Computing from the Victoria University of Manchester. He was the founder in 1996 of Intracus Ltd, whose innovative LDAP directory products were bundled by Novell and Netscape, and which in 1999 created SmartGroups.com, which by 2001 had become Europe's leading Virtual community web site with several million members, and was the precursor to today's social network services.

SmartGroups.com was bought by Freeserve for US$100 million and ran until 2006 when it was shut down by Orange, who had acquired Freeserve some years earlier.
