= SMS Vulkan =

1908 U-boat salvage tug

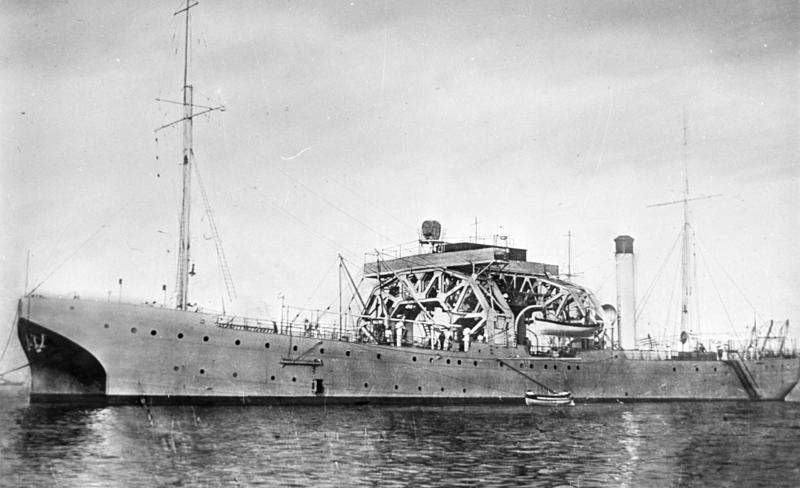
- SMS Vulkan

History

German Empire
- Name: SMS Vulkan
- Builder: Howaldtswerke, Kiel
- Laid down: 1907
- Launched: 28 September 1907
- Commissioned: 4 March 1908
- Homeport: Kiel
- Fate: Sank 6 April 1919

General characteristics
- Displacement: 1595 tons
- Length: 85.3 m (280 ft)
- Beam: 16.5 m (54 ft)
- Draught: 3.85 m (12.6 ft)
- Speed: 12 knots
- Range: 3,000 nm
- Complement: 108 men

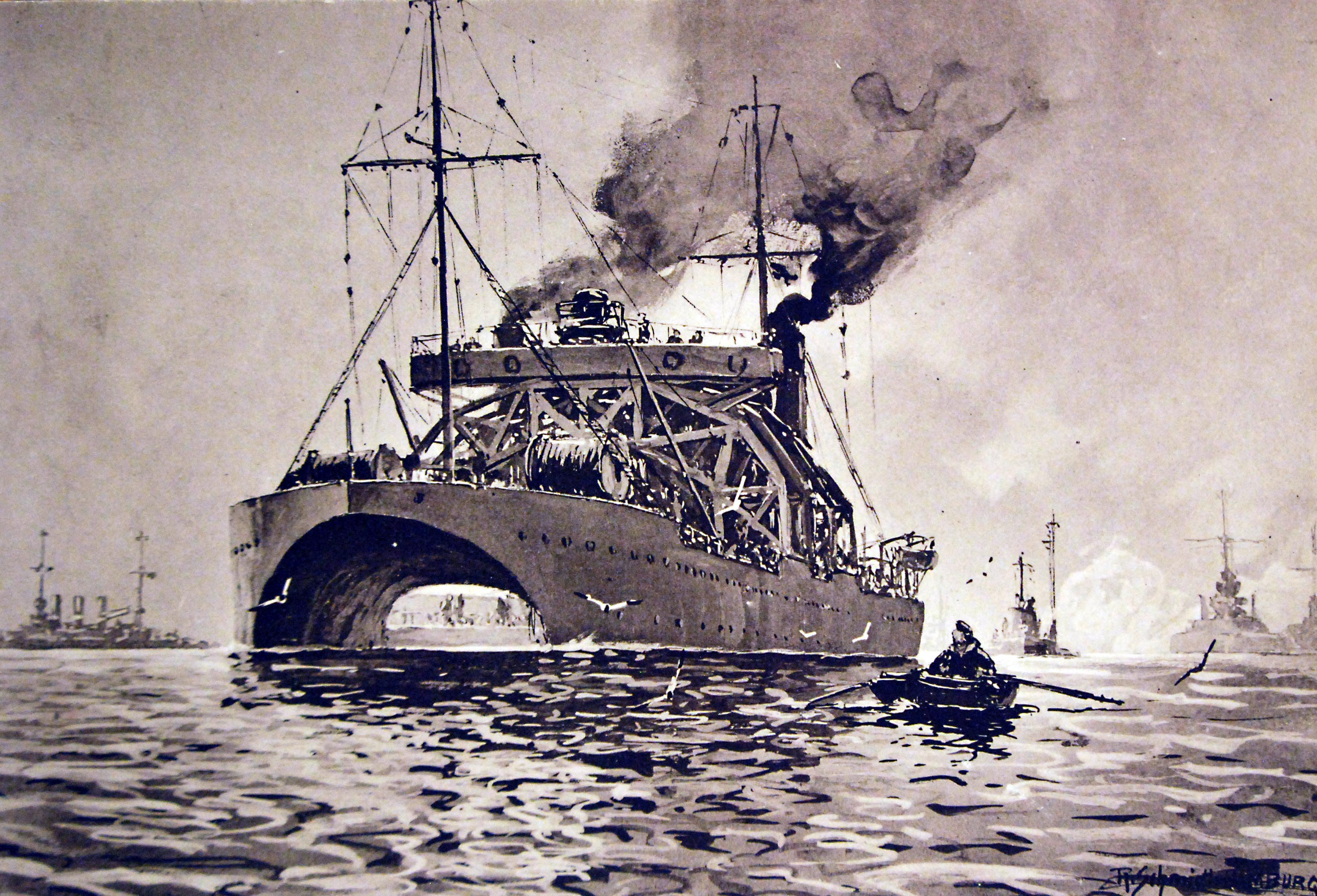
Vulkan during WWI, by R. Schmidt

SMS Vulkan was a U-boat salvage tug in the Kaiserliche Marine laid down in 1907 and commissioned in 1908. The ship displaced 1595 tons and had a top speed of 12 knots.

The famous U-boat commander Max Valentiner served as salvage officer on Vulkan in early 1911. On 17 January 1911, he and the crew saved all 30 men from U-3 by rescuing them via a torpedo tube after it sank near Kiel harbour in Heikendorfer Bay because of an unclosed ventilation shaft valve. Amongst the saved crew was Otto Weddigen, the later commander of U-9 and Paul Clarrendorf, the commander of U-boot-Abnahme-Kommando in Kiel which enlisted U-boat crews.

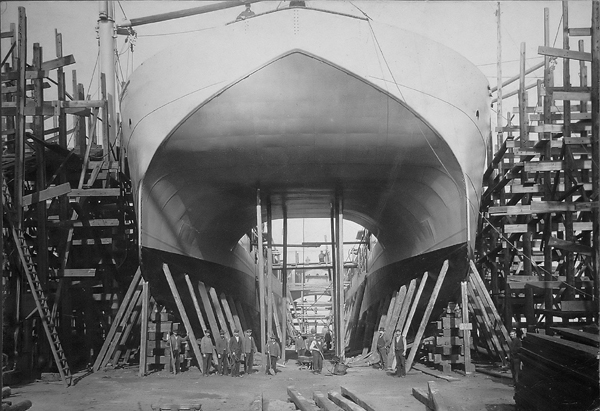
Vulkan during construction

Vulkan is also famous for salvaging two U-boats, U-30 on 27 August 1915 and UC-45 on 17 September 1917.

At the end of World War One on 11 November 1918 the vessel surrendered to the British forces together with the larger salvage tug SMS Cyclop. It sank en route to Harwich on 6 April 1919 in position 54°54′N 06°18′E.

== See also ==
- Russian salvage ship Kommuna
