= G. Prout & Sons =

Designer / manufacturer of the Shearwater III and of cruising catamarans

G. Prout and Sons
- Company type: Private
- Industry: Boatbuilding
- Founded: 1935; 90 years ago in Canvey Island, United Kingdom
- Founders: Geoffrey Prout, Roland, and Francis Prout,
- Defunct: 2002; 23 years ago
- Fate: bankrupt
- Headquarters: Canvey Island, Essex, United Kingdom
- Products: Initially folding dinghies, canoes and kayaks, then sailing catamarans

G. Prout and Sons of Canvey Island, Essex, in the United Kingdom, was initially a builder of folding dinghies, canoes and kayaks founded in 1935. In the 1950s, the company moved to the construction of small sailing catamarans with Shearwater I and later Shearwater III, which the National Maritime Museum describes as the first production catamaran in the world. The company then developed from small catamarans to larger cruising vessels. G. Prout & Sons was dissolved in 2002.

== History ==
Geoffrey Prout, a boating expert, writer, and World War I veteran, founded the company in 1935 after receiving a patent for his folding boat (collapsible canoe) in January 1935. Brothers Francis and Roland Prout were canoeists who took part in the 1952 Helsinki Olympics. They worked in the family firm G. Prout & Sons Ltd, with their father, making folding canoes and dingies. They developed their first catamaran, the Shearwater I in the early 1950s. Initially they experimentally lashed together two K1 kayaks and added a bamboo platform and a mast and sail, and after the success of this went on to build the Shearwater I, in which they participated in local regattas. They then developed the Shearwater III.

The brothers were both awarded the Freedom of the City of London and were appointed liverymen of the Worshipful Company of Shipwrights.

In 1975 the brothers became directors of a new company, Prout Catamarans, while Frank's son and Roland's daughter continued to make catamarans as G. Prout & Sons Ltd. Prout Catamarans changed its name to 199 AB Limited in 2001 and went into administration the same year. In 1989 G. Prout & Sons Ltd was renamed Prout Holdings Ltd, and on 22 April 2020 the decision was made to wind up the company and a liquidator was appointed.

== Cruising catamarans ==
Prouts built a large range of catamarans. The table is sorted initially by length of vessel, and is composed of those built in the company's heyday.

Model	Launch date
Prout Swift	1954
Apollo 18	1969
Prout Cougar	1962
Prout Ranger 27	1962
Prout Ranger 45	1965
Prout Scirocco 26	1982
Prout Quest 31	1978
Prout Quest 33	1985
Prout Event 34	1993
Prout Snowgoose 35	1970
Prout Snowgoose 37	1978
Prout Snowgoose Elite	1986
Prout 38	1998
Prout Escale 39	1991
Prout 45	1995
Prout 46 Ken Freivokh Design	1998
Prout Quasar 50	1980

=== Prout catamaran rig ===
For their cruising catamarans, Prout took to adopting a radical version of the classic Bermuda sloop rig. Arguing that cruising catamarans excel when sailing downwind or with wind on the quarter, Prout gave their catamarans an extremely large genoa, and a mainsail much reduced in area. Whereas most cruising cats have the mast at the front of (or ahead of) the bridgedeck cabin, Prout sites the mast towards the rear. This has proved effective, although to traditional eyes the Prout rig can seem somewhat disproportionate.

== Folding dinghies ==
Prout were also renowned for their folding dinghies made from wood and PVC Coated Canvas. These were available as full Sailing Dinghies (able to be rowed or powered), rowing and powered only or rowing only.

The names of these dinghies were determined by their length.

Model	Length
Seabird	10 ft
Seaswallow	8 ft 6in
Seasprite	7 ft 6in

The 10 ft Seabird was a 10 ft Dagger board Sailing Dinghy, for sail, row and outboard, taking a sail area of 40sq. ft. and Folds to 10 ft. 3in.: 1 ft 6in: 6in and was sold complete with sail and all gear. Oars were extra. It weighed 102 lbs. The 8 ft 6in Seaswallow was an 8 ft 6in. Dagger board Sailing Dinghy, for sail, row and outboard, taking a sail area of 40sq. ft. and was sold complete with sail and all gear. Oars were extra. It weighed 86 lbs. The 7 ft 6in Seasprite was an 7 ft 6in. Dagger board Sailing Dinghy, for sail, row and outboard, and was sold complete with sail and all gear. Oars were extra.

Oars were 5 ft for the Seasprite and Seaswallow and 6 ft for the Seabird. There was a spray deck available for the Seabird. There were trollies for the Seasprite and Seaswallow or Seabird.

Also, there were Rowing and outboard options which were identical to the sailing versions but without a Dagger board for the Seabird (10 ft) and Seaswallow (8 ft 6in) versions.

Rowing only options were available as small yacht dinghies. Yacht Dinghy at 7 ft 6in. Scoprel at 6 ft. Rowing Coracle at 5 ft.

There was an outboard attachment for the rowing dinghies.
