= Lakana =

Watercraft of the Malagasy people

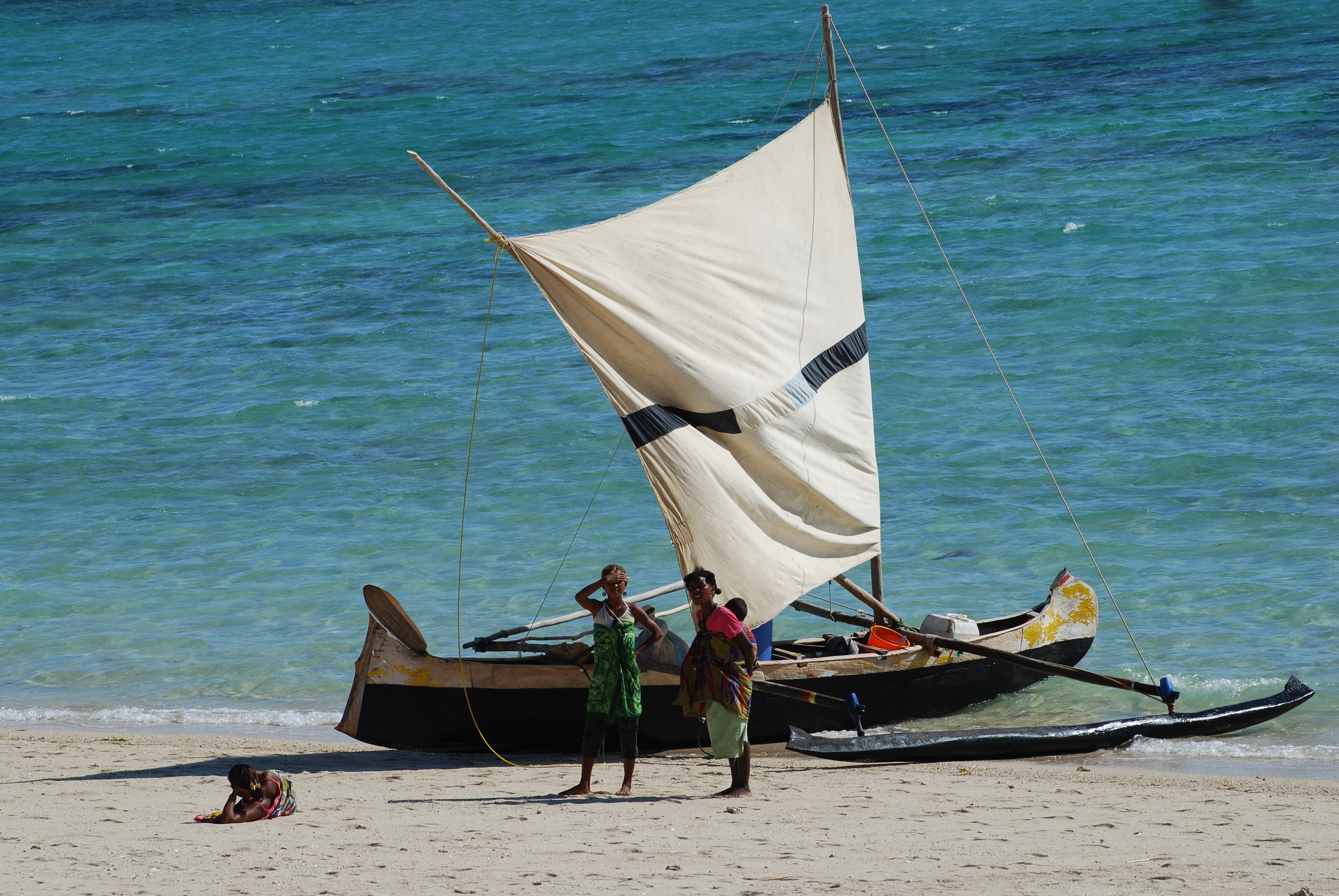
A lakana of the Vezo people, rigged with a Common Sprit sail or tehy mihanto rig

Lakana, also known as laka, are the traditional watercraft of the Malagasy people of Madagascar. It has several different types, but the most common is the lakana fiara (also known simply as the laka), a single-outrigger canoe with a dugout main hull (often extended with additional planks). Sailing versions are called lakana lay; a dugout canoe without outrigger or sails (as used in inland waterways) is called a molonga.

The outrigger and sailing lakana are primarily used in the western coast of Madagascar, particularly among the semi-nomadic Vezo people for fishing and for passenger transport.

Lakana are also used by the Kibushi-speaking Malagasy people of the French overseas territory of Mayotte and elsewhere in the Comoros.

== Description ==
=== Hull ===
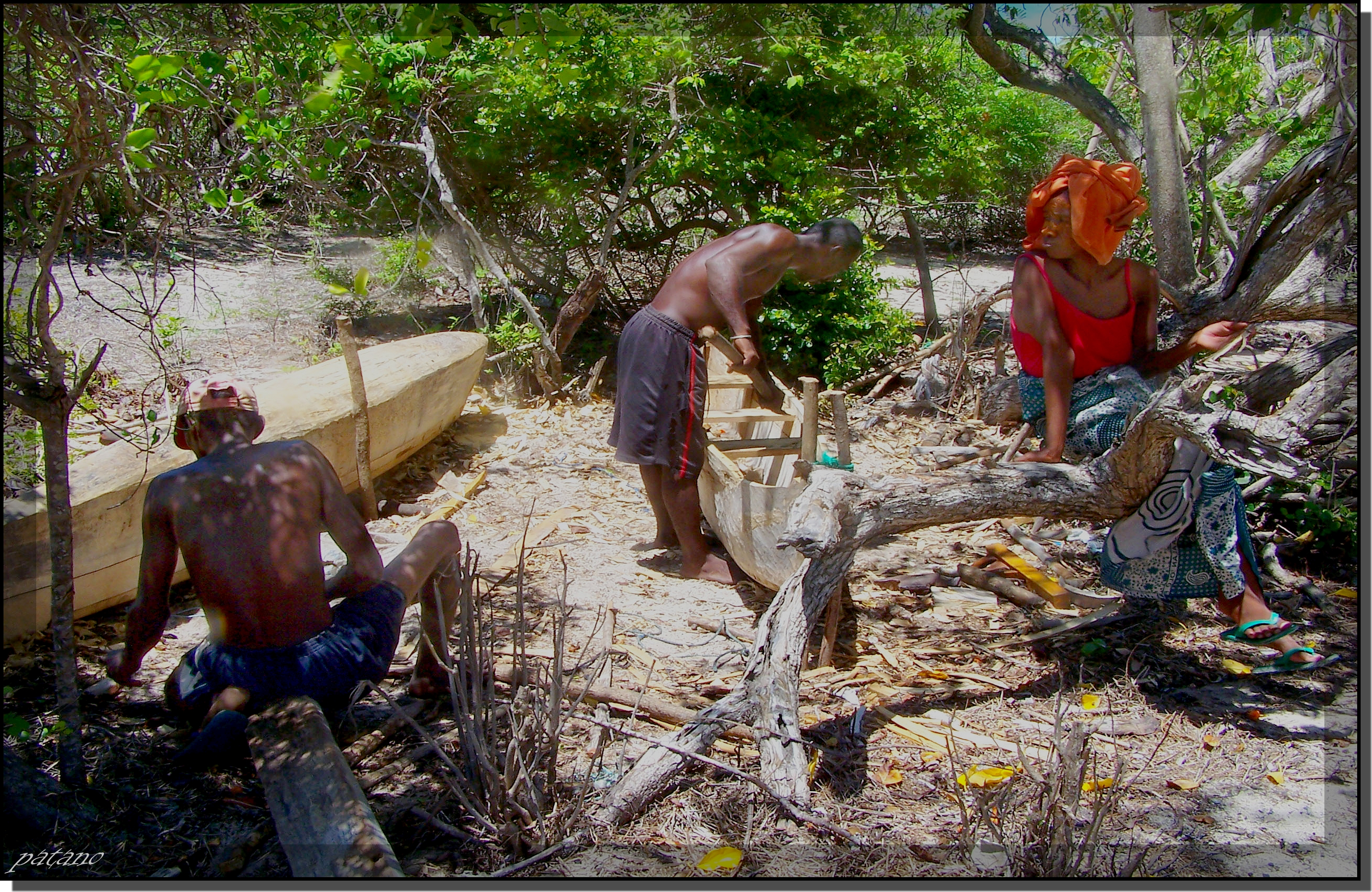
Construction of small lakana in Antsiranana

The term lakana or laka more accurately refers to the dugout which serves as the main hull or the keel (in larger boats). The dugout is made from a single tree trunk, which must be carefully chosen, cut down, and carved in place. The preferred wood used is from the farafatsy tree (Givotia madagascariensis). Before drying and other preparations, the freshly-carved dugout that will become either the hull or the keel is known as the roka (which is not yet considered a proper canoe). Carving the roka is considered the most difficult step in the making of a canoe. It is shaped to a narrow sharp edge on both ends, though its exact shape and preparation method vary based on whether it is intended to be a monoxylon or a keel for a plank-built hull. Greater attention is given to the distinct upturned prow (the firanà), as its shape affects the speed and stability of the boat. The particular shape of the tip of the prow and stern is a distinguishing mark for different Malagasy ethnic groups.

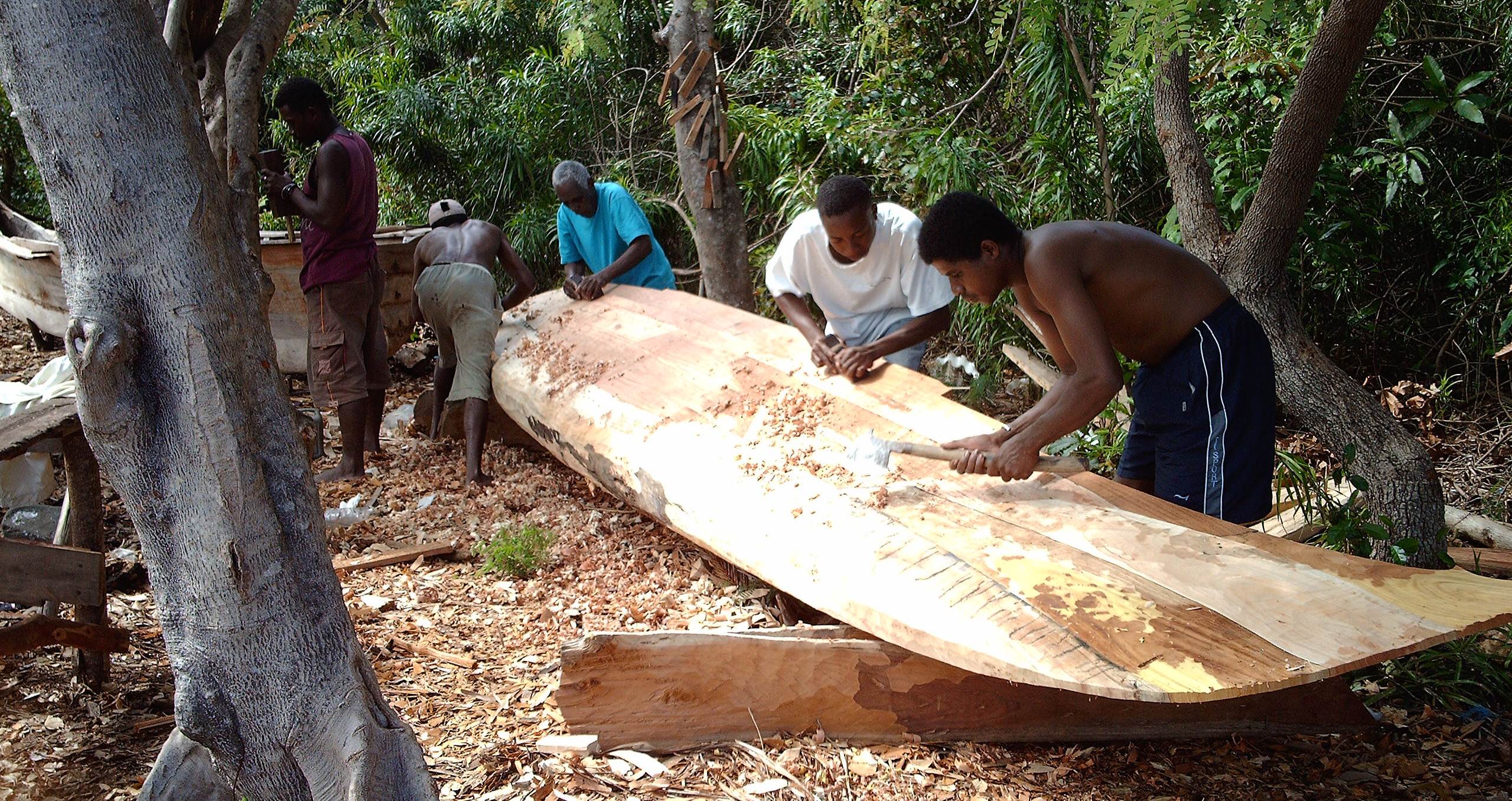
Construction of a plank-built lakana in Nosy Komba

In larger vessels, the dugout serves as the keel and is extended with additional planks on the sides. These are traditionally constructed without nails (though modern canoes use nails), and are instead fixed with hardwood pegs and sewn together with raffia palm fibers. The planks must perfectly fit along the edges to the dugout and to each other, to avoid leakage. Supports for the booms and seats are fitted directly into the hull. A wooden rail is then fitted to the upper edge of the hull to fix the other components in place. The bottom part of the hull is waterproofed with tar, while the upper part is usually painted. Once completed and dried fully, the other parts, like outriggers and rigs, are then assembled.

The hull traditionally has no rudder, but are steered by means of a paddle. Modern lakana can also be equipped with motor engines (usually less than 15 horsepower). It can also be propelled traditionally with paddles known as fivè or fivoy, or punting poles known as lopondrà. Other traditional equipment associated with the lakana include the havitrà (the boat hook), and the dimà (a wooden bailer).

=== Outrigger ===
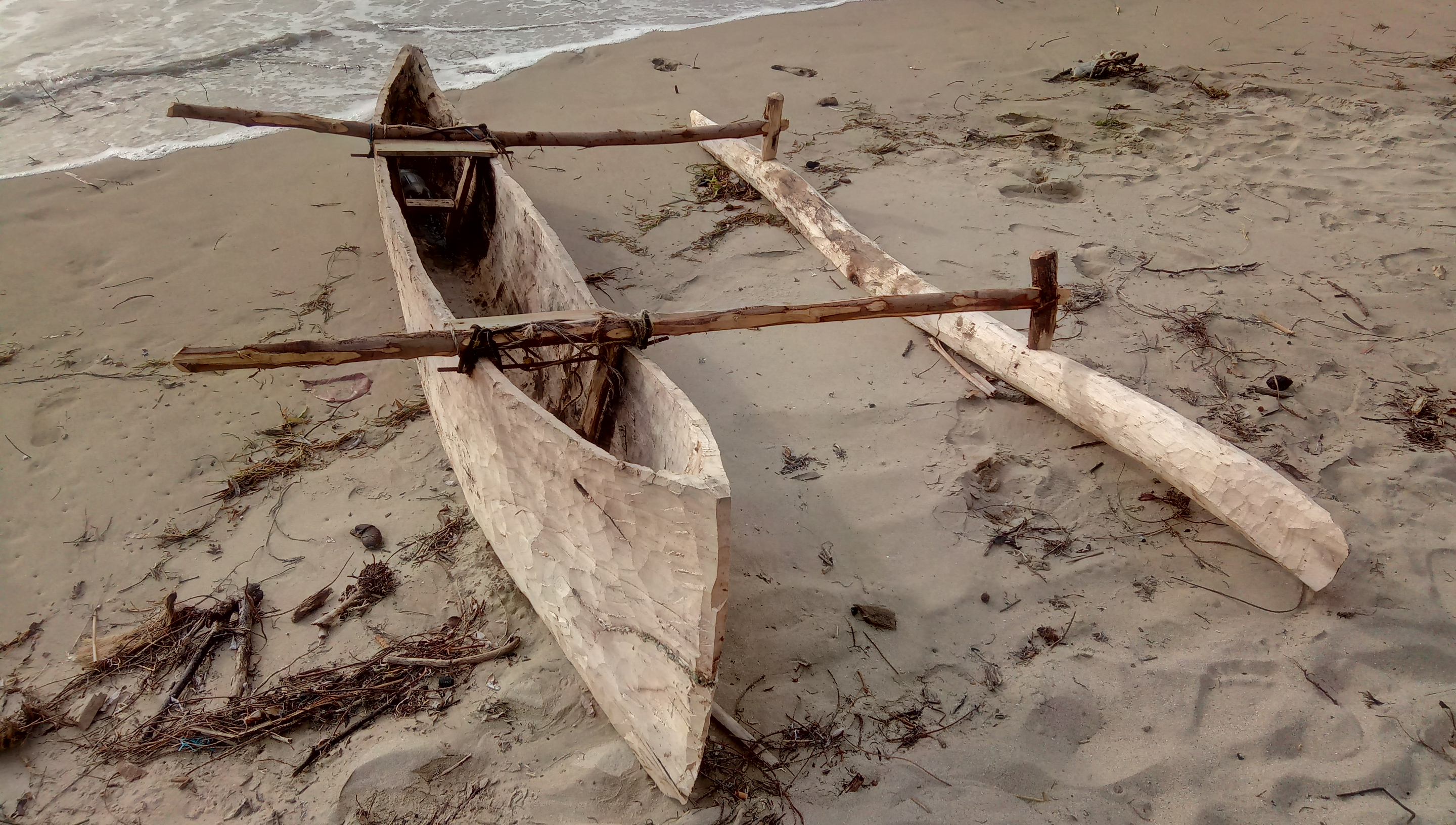
A small lakana from the island of Nosy Be, showing the dugout main hull attached to the float with booms and peg stanchions

The type of hull fitted with an outrigger is known as lakan-jilo (also lakam-jilo or lakan-jejo), meaning "sharp-edged lakana," due to its shape. The outrigger is known as fanarinà (lit. "that which maintains the equilibrium", fanary in some dialects) or fangarahanà (lit. "that which is always covered [by water]"). The booms that connect it to the hull are known as raronà, varonadukanà, varona, or tanam-panary; while the connecting peg stanchions on the float are known as the tatikà.

The lakana is generally a single-outrigger boat, with only one outrigger float. Some forms are described as "pseudo-double-outrigger" with a vestigial second outrigger float that has become a balancing lighter pole on one side opposite the actual float. This counterbalance pole is known as the fanarinà boty or fanary boty (lit. "small fanarinà").

=== Sail and rigging ===
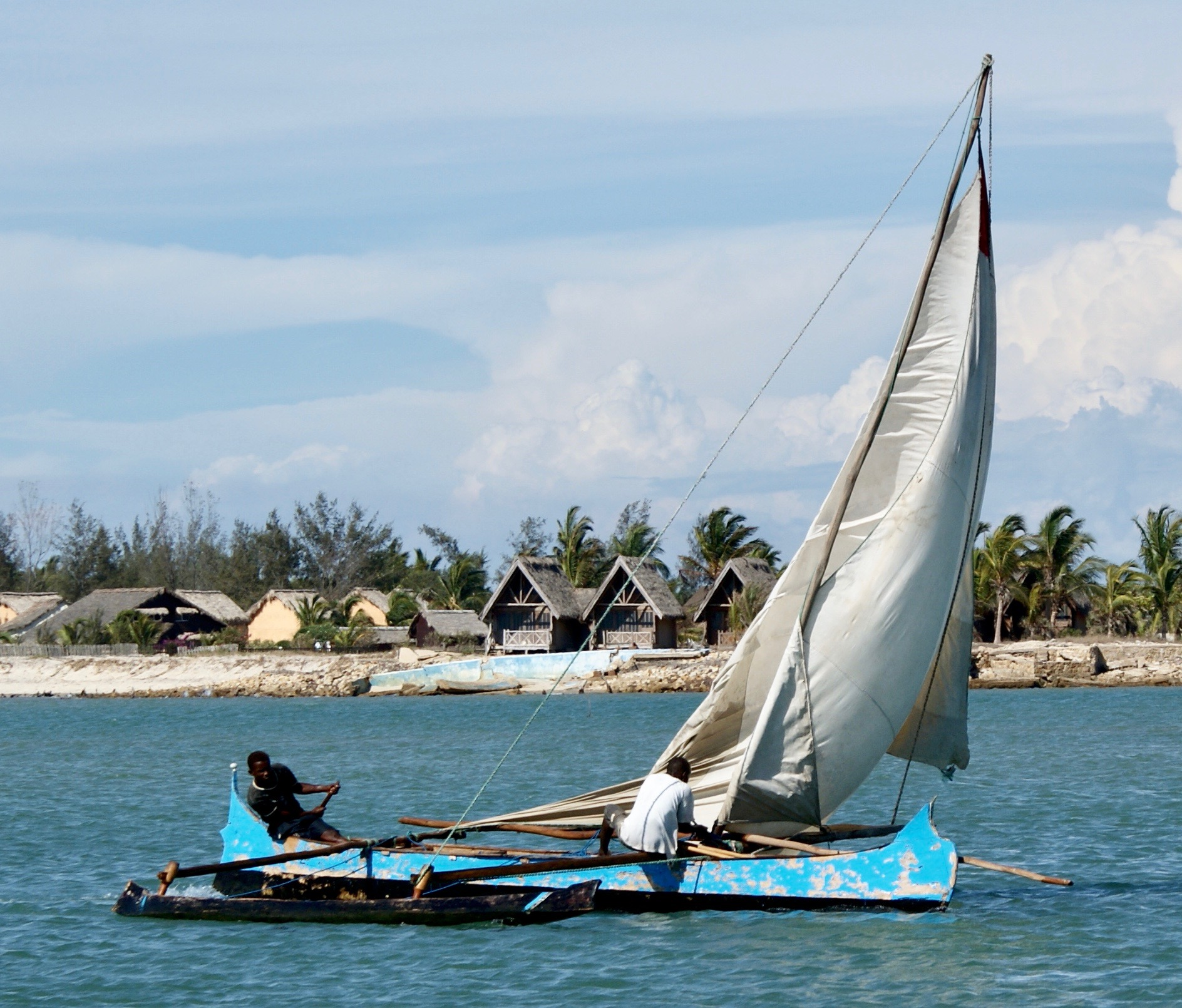
The position of the steersman and the sail operator on a lakana underway in Betania

Most lakana are equipped with a large square-shaped sail, known as the lay, historically woven from raffia palm fibers. It is rigged to two removable V-shaped masts (a "double spritsail") loosely lashed to the front boom of the outrigger and fitted to a series of carved holes on the hull. By shifting the foot of the poles into different holes, the sails can be trimmed for either running before the wind (a square sail configuration) or sailing close-hauled (a fore-and-aft configuration). Doran (1981) identifies that both tacking and shunting techniques are also practiced in Madagascar, similar to those done in Oceanian single-outrigger canoes.

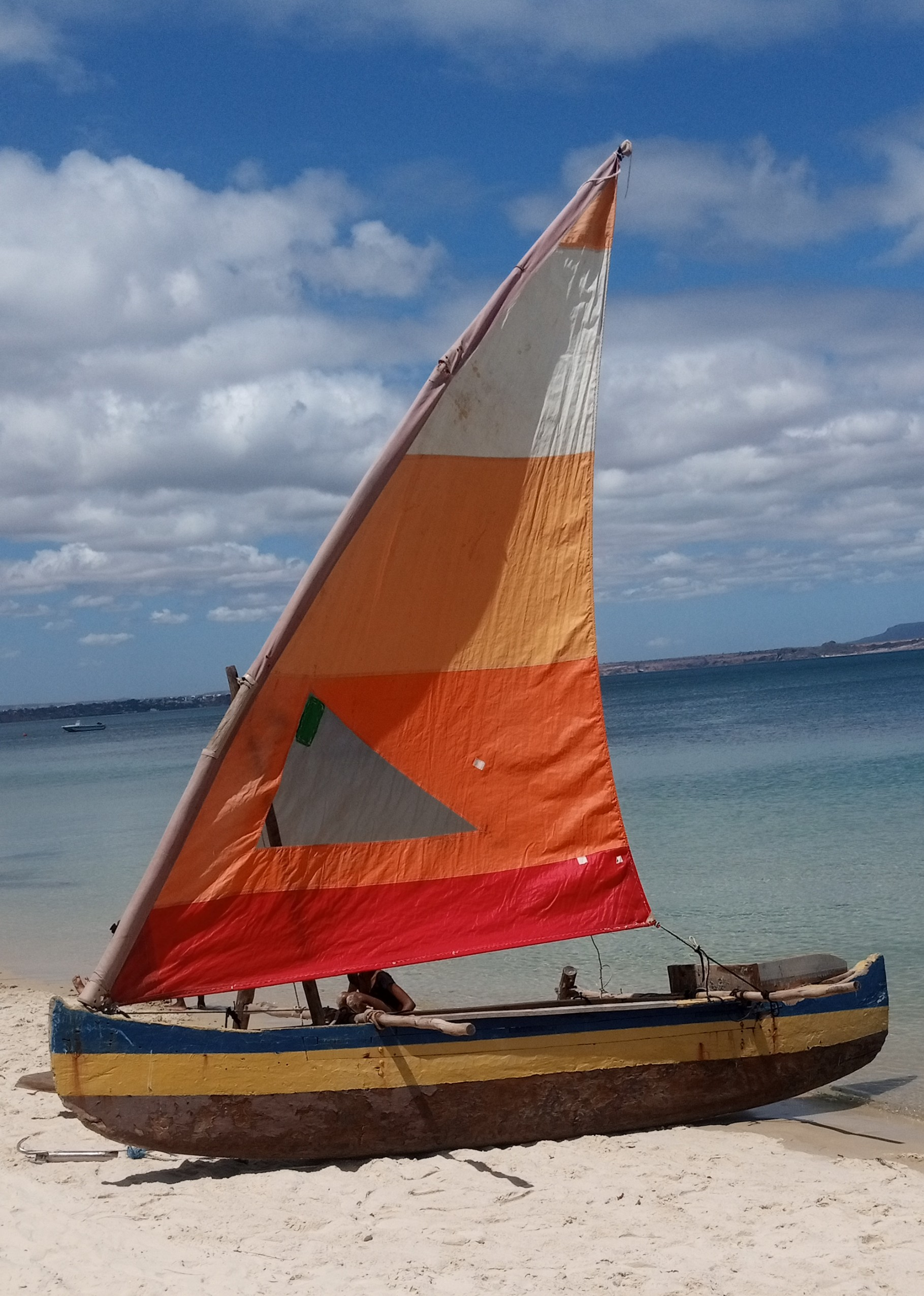
Lakana with a lateen rig

The vertical removable mast of the rig is known as the mingory and it is tied to the booms with lines known as jarary. The non-native lateen rig (acquired from Arabs) is also used more commonly among lakana in the northwestern coast of Madagascar and in the Comoros.

The smallest lakana can be sailed by a single person, but for all other types of lakana, sailing requires at least two people. One sits at the rear and operates the steering paddle, while another sits behind the masts and operates the sails. The steersman orders the sail operator to change the positions of the masts and sails when needed. The sail operator does this by manipulating the sail ropes, adjusting the mast configurations along the guide holes after a change in wind direction, and sometimes perching on the outrigger boom to balance the canoe against sudden wind changes. The most difficult task is rigging a lakana at sea. The heavy wooden masts, usually around 5 m (16 ft) long, have to be submerged vertically into the water to orient it. They are then lifted straight up and fitted gently unto their sockets.

== Types ==
Along the west coast of Madagascar, the simplest type of lakana without outriggers, sails, or additional planks is known as the laka molanga. It is often simply called the molanga to differentiate it from the lakana fiara (also usually shortened to laka). The word molanga is the local name for several tree species with soft, light-colored wood. It is carved from the trunk of a single tree. Once carved, it is allowed to dry and is then used without further modifications. Molanga are typically used for navigating rivers and channels. They are easy to operate and can be paddled by women and even children. Their sizes can vary, but they are usually very narrow.

Lakana from the west coast with both outriggers and sails are known as lakana fiara (also lakana piara, laka fihara, lakamfiara, laka fiara, or laka piaro), with the fiara (lit. "palanquin") referring to the raised seat in the middle of the hull. These are around 6 to 8 m (20 to 26 ft) long and 0.6 to 0.8 m (2.0 to 2.6 ft) wide. The dugout keel of lakana fiara are extended with additional strakes on the sides, sometimes as many as thirteen to fifteen different pieces. These are the vessels most commonly used for fishing and passenger transport.

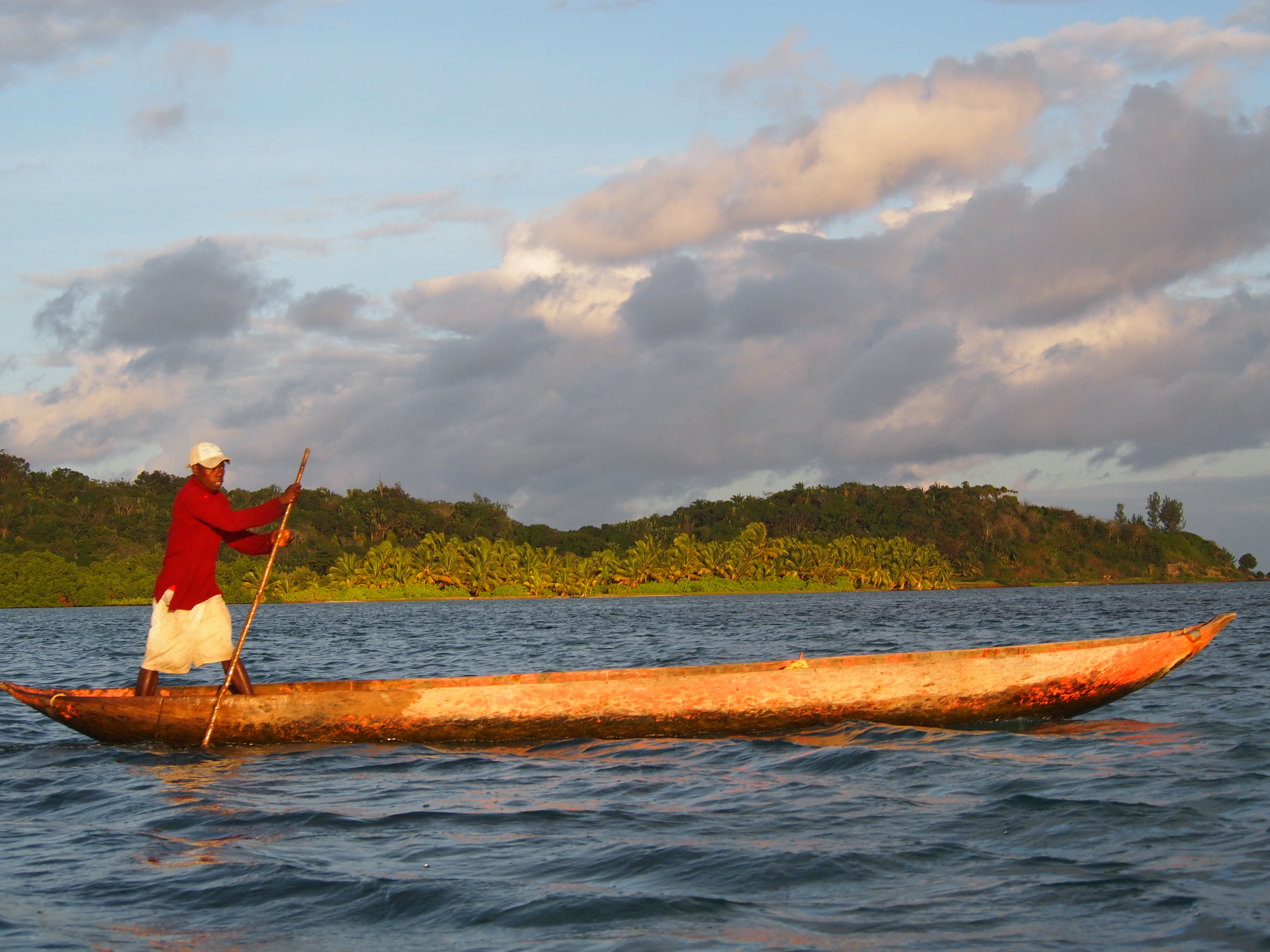
A typical east coast lakana without outriggers or sails, used as a water taxi in Nosy Boraha

Larger plank-built lakana are known as lakan-drafitra (lit. "built lakana" or "assembled lakana") or lakan-pafana (lit. "plank lakana"). These are equipped with multiple benches athwart the hull (which also function as structural support, in lieu of ribs), known as sakan'; with the aftmost bench where the steersman sits being known as the sakan'-poulan'. D'Escamps (1884) reports that lakan-drafitra can be as large as 10 metres (33 ft) long. The hull are made of around seventeen different pieces (not counting the benches). This term originally applied to large native lakana with outriggers, but it has also been used for colonial-era European-style plank boats without outriggers.

Sea-going lakana on the eastern coast of Madagascar also typically do not have outriggers or sails. They are known as lakan'-kan'-ongoutche (lit. "leg lakana"). They are generally narrow and longer than the lakana fiara, but they were described as being unstable and capsizing frequently.

== Cultural significance ==
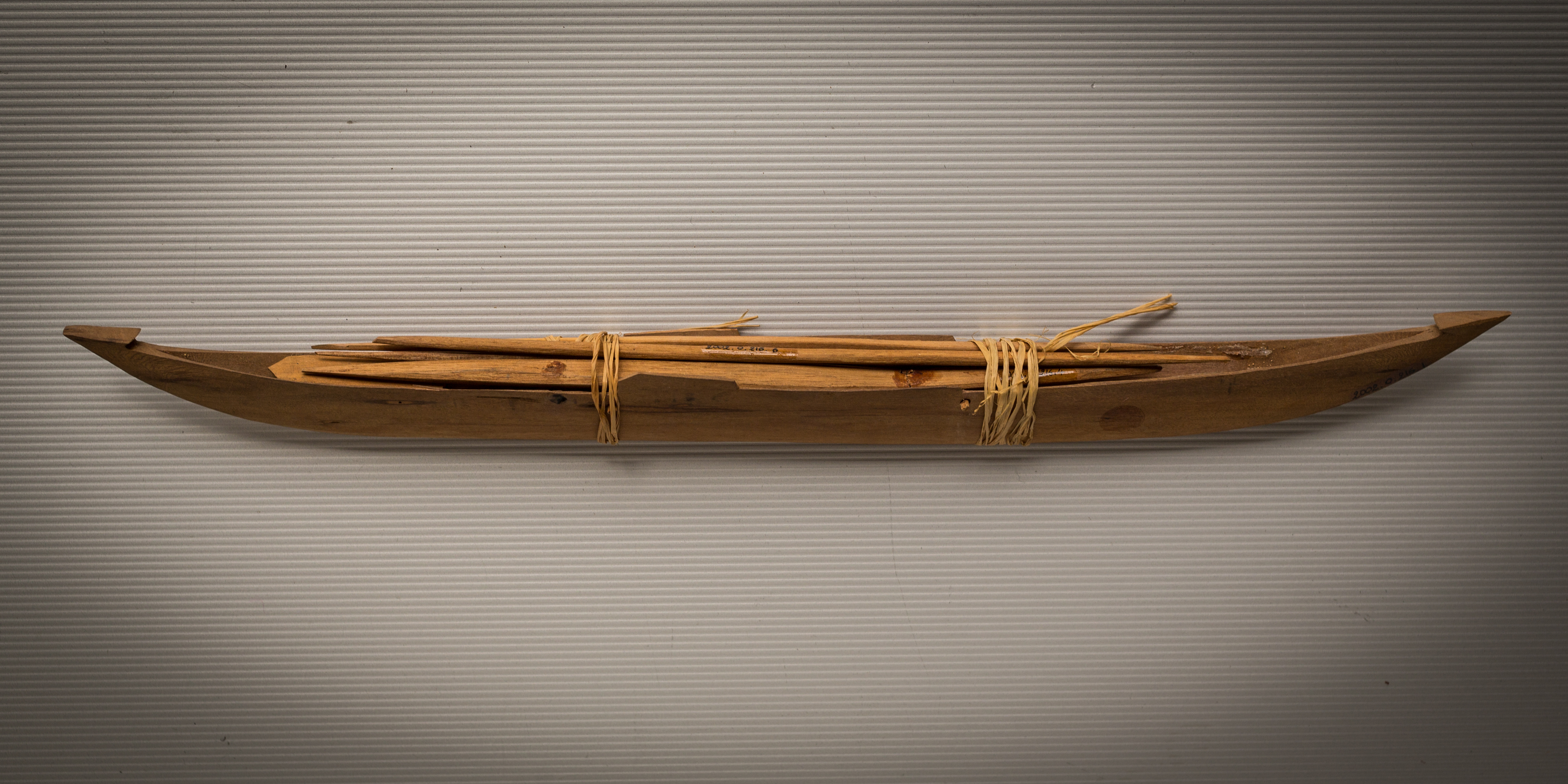
A Vezo lakana with the float and booms disassembled, from the ethnographic collection of the University of Strasbourg

Lakana are most closely associated with the Vezo people of the west coast of Madagascar. The Vezo are not considered a "genuine" ethnic group, rather it is a blanket term referring to various semi-nomadic seafaring groups that live along the coast and whose primary livelihood is fishing. The majority of the Vezo are related to the neighboring Masikoro (who are similarly defined by being farmers and herders), but it can refer to anyone from any ethnic group that migrates to the west coast and adopts the coastal way of life.

Building lakana among the Vezo is a communal effort, mostly done by men, though women are not banned. Young Vezo boys are encouraged to help in the easier tasks to gain experience. Discarded pieces of wood are also used by boys to make toy canoes, often precise replicas of the lakana under construction.

== History ==
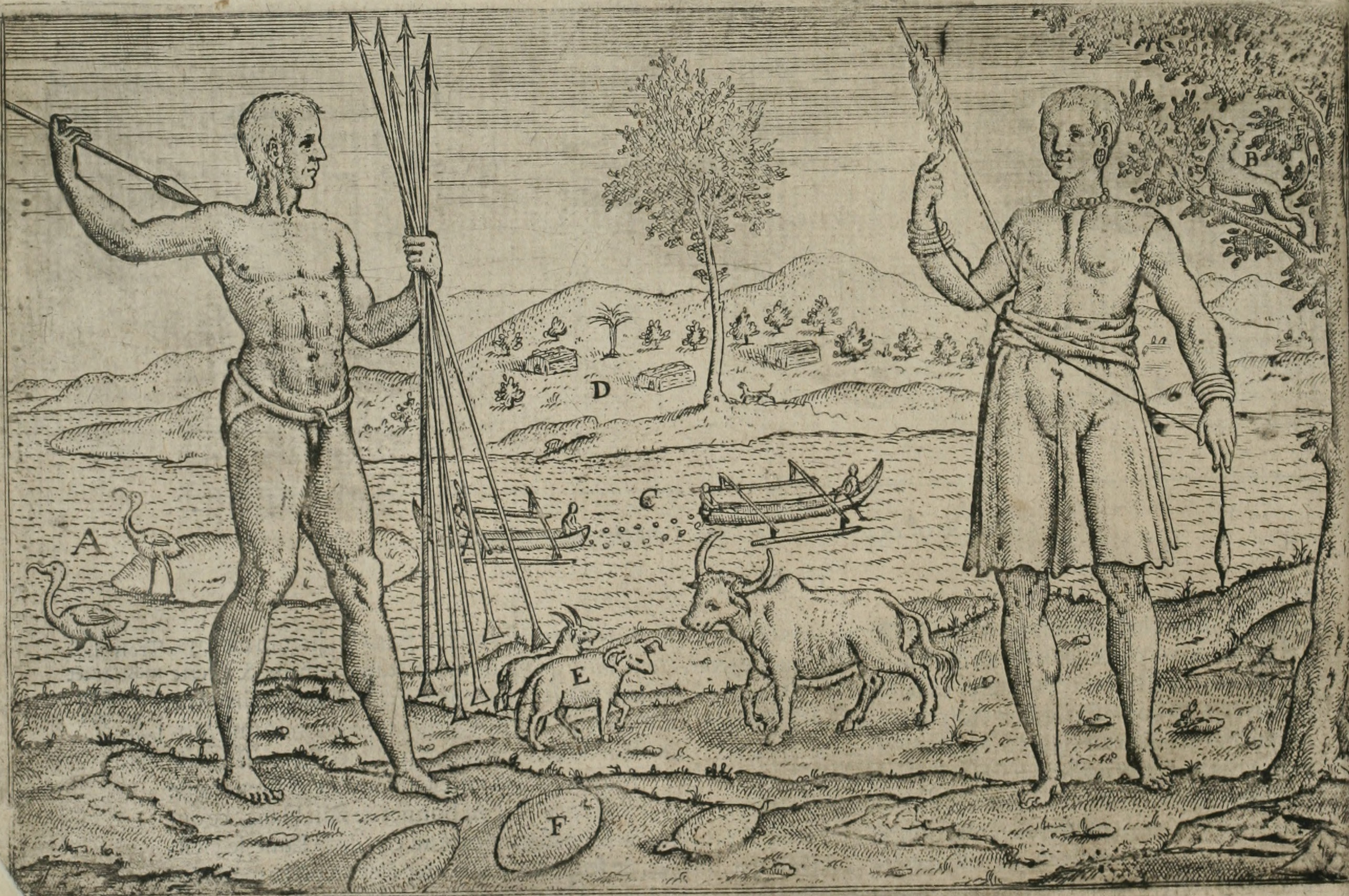
Depiction of "laccas" in 1595 in Saint Augustin from Premier Livre de la Navigation aux Indes Orientales par les Hollandais (Willem Lodewijcksz, 1609). Note the double-outriggers

The earliest mention and depiction of lakana was from the account of Willem Lodewijcksz, a Dutch sailor and author, on the first Dutch expedition to the East Indies. In 1595, the Dutch fleet had anchored to resupply in the port of Saint Augustin, on the mouth of the Onilahy River in southwest Madagascar. In the book Premier Livre de la Navigation aux Indes Orientales par les Hollandais (1609), Lodewijcksz describes the native watercraft of the Malagasy people. He repeatedly refers to them as "canoas", using a term borrowed from the watercraft of the Arawak people of the Caribbean; though he also specifies that they are "laccas" (laka). He describes them as being shaped like Venetian gondolas. In the accompanying illustration, the "laccas" are depicted as having double-outriggers in contrast to the modern lakana.

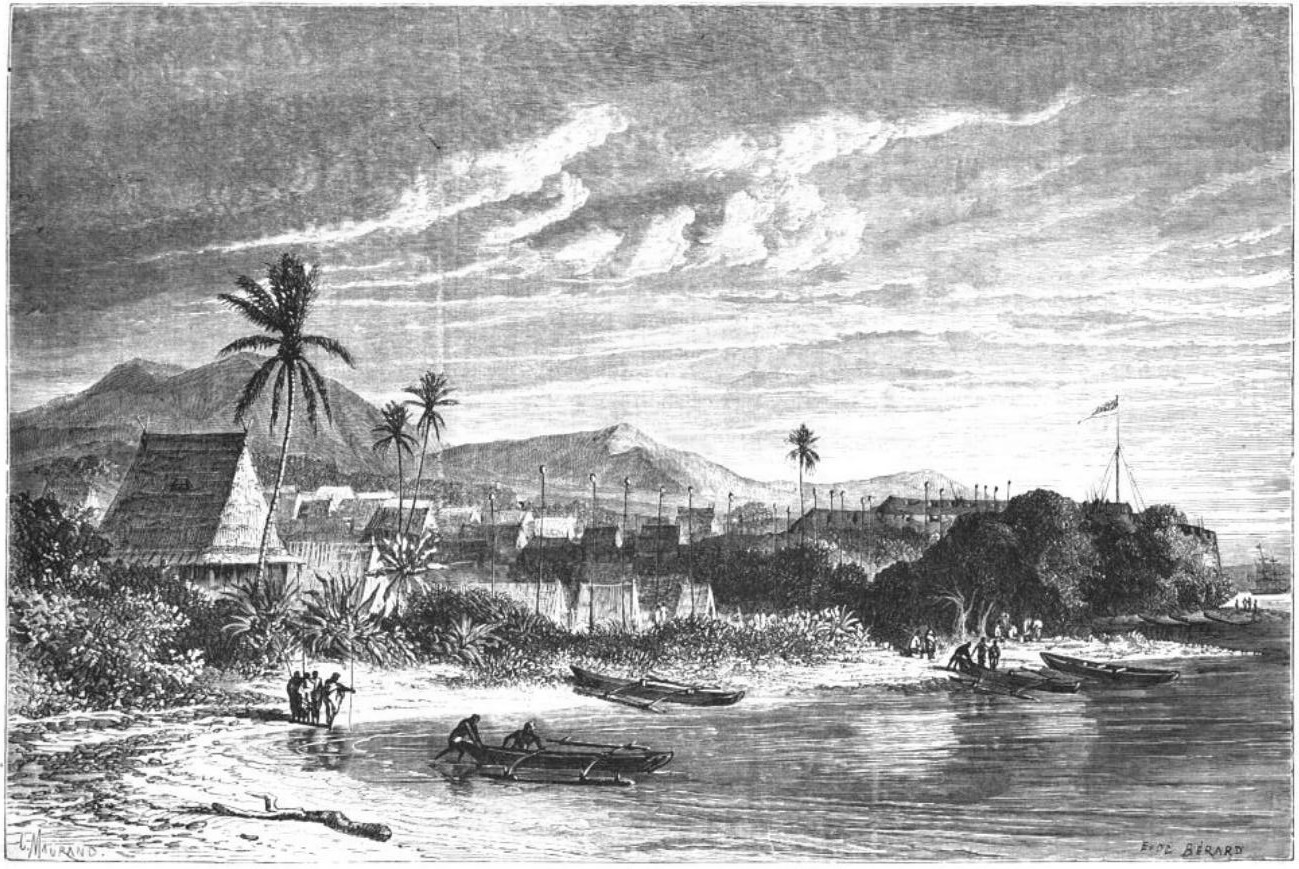
Lakana in Toamasina from Le Tour du Monde, Nouveau Journal des Voyages (Évremond de Bérard, 1861)

Accounts from Cornelis de Houtman (1595) and Richard Boothby (1644) also mention numerous double-outrigger forms in Saint Augustin. But by 1846, Macé Descartes records that both single and double-outrigger forms now exist, comparing them to similar native boats from Polynesia.

Hornell (1920) theorized that the traditional canoes of Madagascar may have originally possessed double-outriggers, derived from the double-outrigger configuration common in Indonesia. It evolved from being double to almost exclusively single-outrigger relatively recently. Hence the historical depictions of double-outrigger lakana by European authors in areas where they are now nonexistent. Hornell mentions surviving examples of true double-outriggers from the mouth of the Sambao River (near the island of Nosy Voalavo, Besalampy) and in Cape Sainte Marie. Elsewhere in mainland East Africa, double-outrigger forms survive, like the Tanzanian ngalawa. This conclusion is supported by later authors like Boulinier et al. (1976), but is rejected by others like Doran (1974) and Mahdi (1999).

=== Piracy ===
From around 1790 to 1820, lakan-drafitra with outriggers and sails were recorded as being used by Malagasy warriors in repeated large-scale slave raids on coastal settlements in the Comoros and mainland East Africa. These raids typically occur at around October each year.

European and Comorian accounts described the raiders as having large well-organized fleets, ranging from 150 to 600 large canoes, each capable of carrying twenty to sixty men. The size of the ships and the sailing skills of the raiders suggest that they mainly originate from the northern and northeastern coast of Madagascar. However, the raiders did not originate from one location alone. One account describes a raiding fleet to Comoros as being composed of warriors from different Malagasy ethnic groups; including Antankarana and Antavaratra people from the north, Sakalava from the west, Betsimisaraka from the east. The establishment of a trade network by the Sakalava Empire may have helped warriors from different regions to coordinate attacks. Parts of the fleets sailed individually from various locations from Madagascar, meeting up with other groups along the way. They halted at the island of Nosy Be to regroup and meet with more ships before continuing onward to the Comoros. During the attack, the raiders would establish a temporary base in one of the islands. From here, they conducted the attacks on surrounding settlements, capturing and enslaving noncombatants and killing the rest. Captured elites would be ransomed off from these temporary bases. They stayed for around seven to eight months before returning to Madagascar. The captured slaves were sold to passing European merchants in the East African slave trade.

The motivation for the attacks and even the exact identities of the raiders are still uncertain, but it is believed that they may have started as military intervention to the political conflicts among the different Muslim sultanates of the Comoro Islands. The raiders may have originally been mercenaries hired by one of the Comorian sultans to attack rivals, but they got out of control and became pirates. The Sakalava Empire is believed to not have been involved in the attacks, as evidenced by the fact that Queen Ravahiny once warned the governor-general of Mozambique of an impending attack whom she insisted were not under her command. Each raid seems to have been led by different leaders each year, with none of them identifying as Sakalava or using the names of Sakalava monarchs.

== Conservation ==
Lakana are traditionally built from the soft and cork-like farafatsy wood (Givotia madagascariensis). However, demand for lumber in boatbuilding has led to the rapid disappearance of large farafatsy trees. There are efforts to replace the wooden hulls of lakana with fiberglass.

== Similar watercraft ==
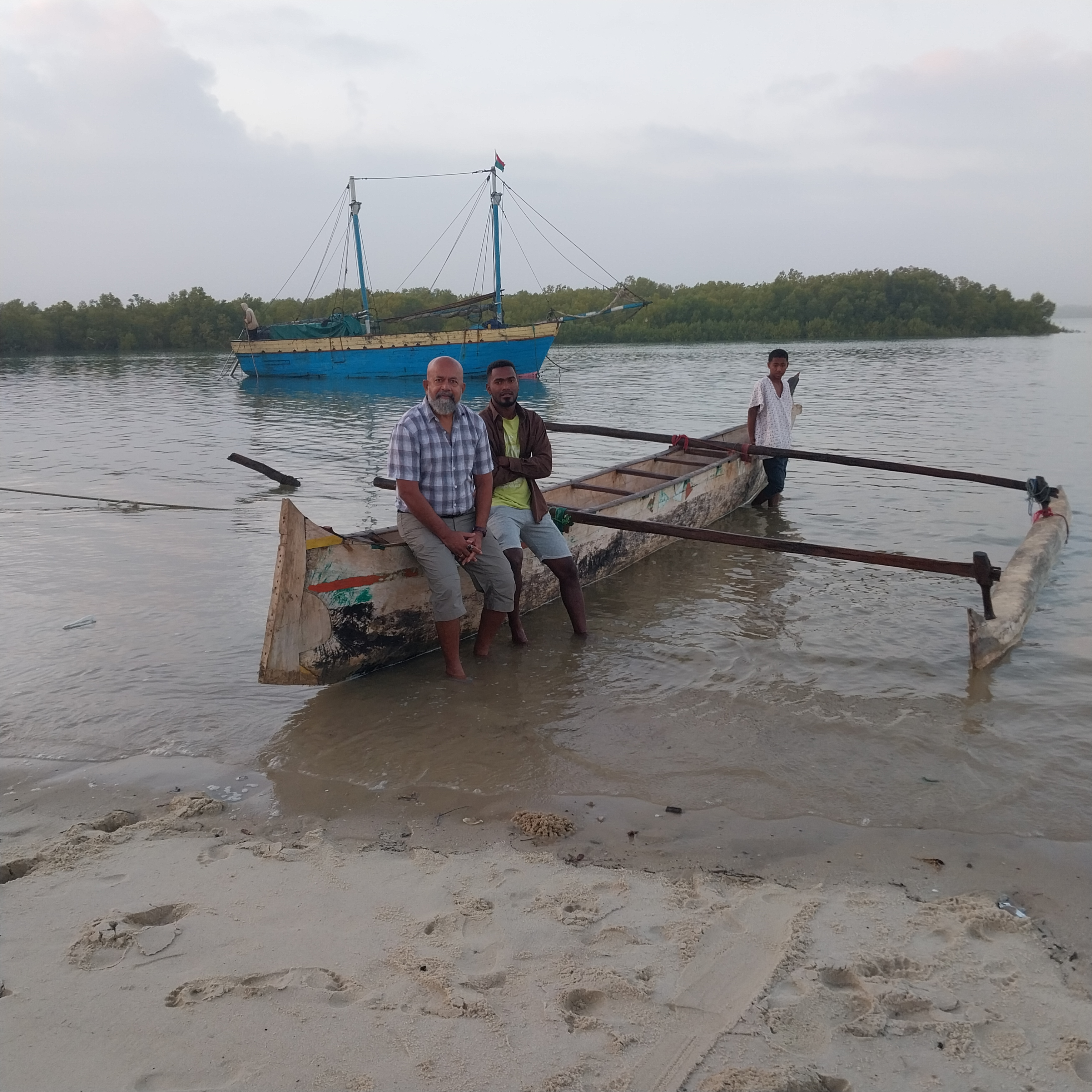
A lakana from a fishing village in Morondava, with a European-style botsy in the background

Lakana are related to other types of indigenous outrigger boats of the Austronesian peoples in Island Southeast Asia and Oceania. Austronesian outrigger and boat-building technologies were also adopted via contact by non-Austronesian groups in neighboring mainland East Africa, like the Tanzanian ngalawa and the Fulani laana; and in Sri Lanka and southern India.

Lakana are also referred to by the general French terms "pirogue" or "pirogue à balancier." It is differentiated from the botsy, a larger European-style vessel based on the schooner, originally taught by French shipbuilders to the locals in the 19th century.

== See also ==
- Jukung
- Proa
- Va'a
