= Barrettia =

Barrettia may refer to:

- Barrettia, a plant genus synonymized with Ricinodendron
- Barrettia (bivalve), a genus of prehistoric mollusks
