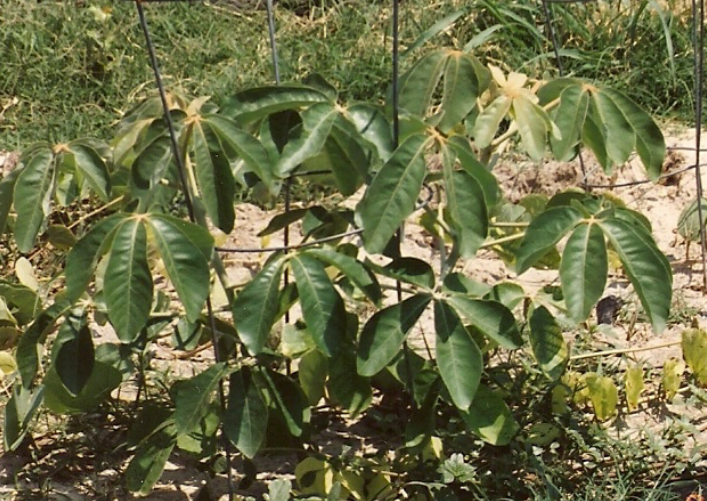
- Schinziophyton rautanenii

Scientific classification
- Kingdom: Plantae
- Clade: Tracheophytes
- Clade: Angiosperms
- Clade: Eudicots
- Clade: Rosids
- Order: Malpighiales
- Family: Euphorbiaceae
- Subfamily: Crotonoideae
- Tribe: Ricinodendreae
- Genus: Schinziophyton; Hutch. ex Radcl.-Sm.
- Species: S. rautanenii

Binomial name
- Schinziophyton rautanenii (Schinz) Radcl.-Sm.

Synonyms
- Ricinodendron rautanenii Schinz

= Mongongo =

Mongongo nut

Species of tree

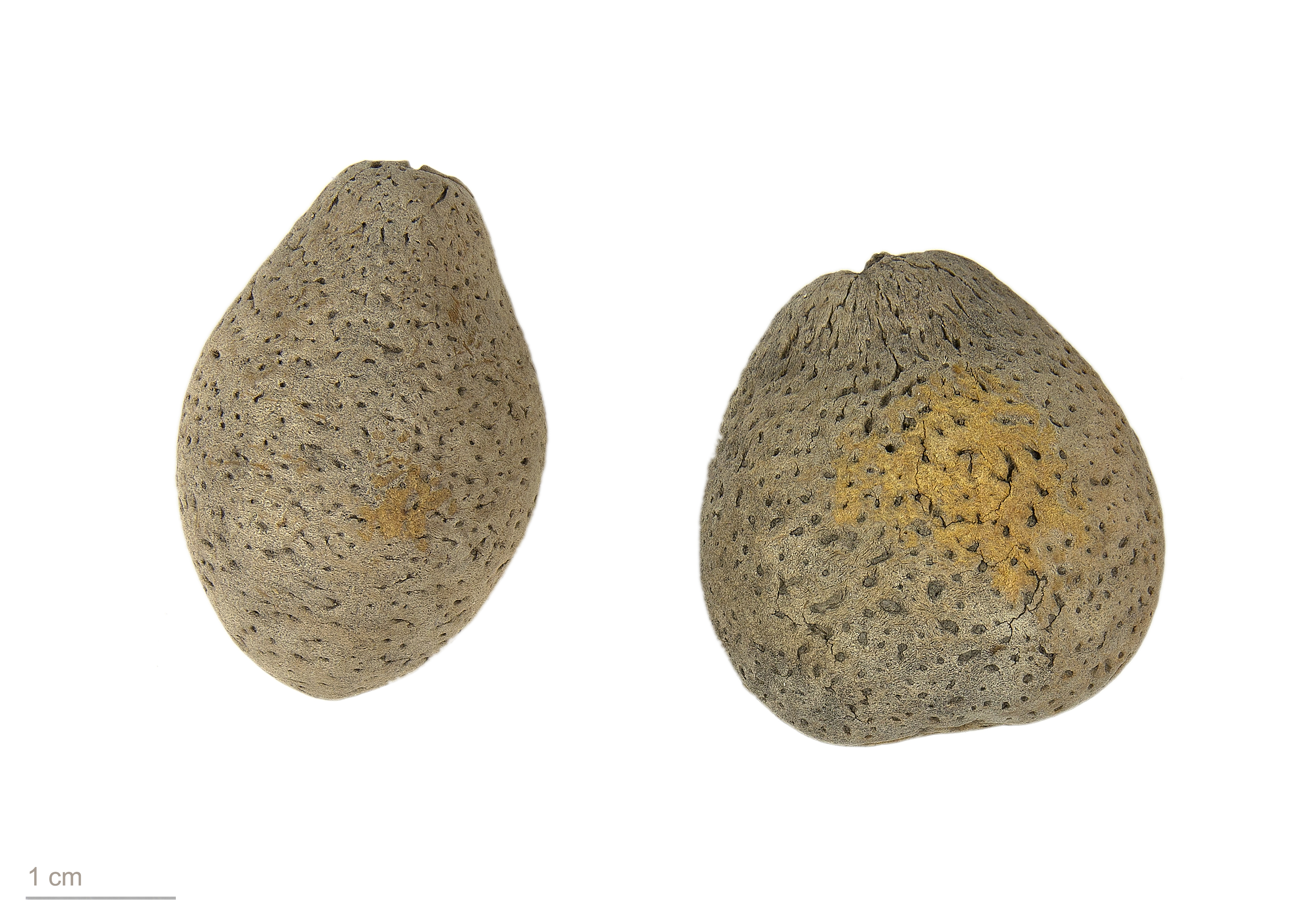
Schinziophyton rautanenii (MHNT)

The mongongo tree, mongongo nut or manketti tree (Schinziophyton rautanenii) is a member of the family Euphorbiaceae and the monotypic genus Schinziophyton.

Native to Africa, the fruits produce an edible nut.

== Description ==
A large, spreading tree, the mongongo reaches 15–20 metres (49–66 ft) tall. The leaves are a distinctive hand-shape, and the pale yellow wood is similar in characteristics to balsa, being both lightweight and strong. The yellowish flowers occur in slender, loose sprays.

The fruits are known as mongongo fruits, mongongo nuts, manketti nuts or nongongo. The egg-shaped, velvety fruits ripen and fall between March and May each year, and contain a thin exocarp around a thick, hard, pitted shell containing an edible nut.

== Taxonomy ==
The genus of Schinziophyton was circumscribed by Josh Hutcherson ex. Alan Radcliffe-Smith in Kew Bull.

The genus name of Schinziophyton is in honour of Hans Schinz (1858–1941), who was a Swiss explorer and botanist and was a native of Zürich.

=== Phylogenetics ===
Within the Ricinodendreae tribe, mongongo is an early clade according to phylogenetic research.

- S. rautanenii (mongongo)
- - R. heudelotii (njangsa) — tropical Africa
  - - G. madagascariensis (farafatsy) — south-western Madagascar
    - G. stipularis — West Madagascar
    - G. rottleriformis — peninsular India and Sri Lanka
    - G. gosai — eastern Ethiopia to Kenya

== Distribution and habitat ==
The mongongo is distributed widely through subtropical southern Africa. There are several distinct belts of distribution, the largest of which reaches from northern Namibia into northern Botswana, south-western Zambia and western Zimbabwe. Another belt is found in eastern Malawi, and yet another in eastern Mozambique.

It is also found in Angola, Tanzania, and the Democratic Republic of the Congo.

It is found on wooded hills and among sand dunes, and is associated with the Kalahari sand soil-types.

== Uses ==
=== Nutrition ===
Per 100 grams shelled nuts:

- 24 g protein
- 57 g fat:
  - 44% polyunsaturated fatty acids
  - 18% monounsaturated fatty acids
  - 17% saturated fatty acids
- 193 mg calcium
- 527 mg magnesium
- 4 mg zinc
- 2.8 mg copper
- 565 mg vitamin E (tocopherol)

=== Culinary ===
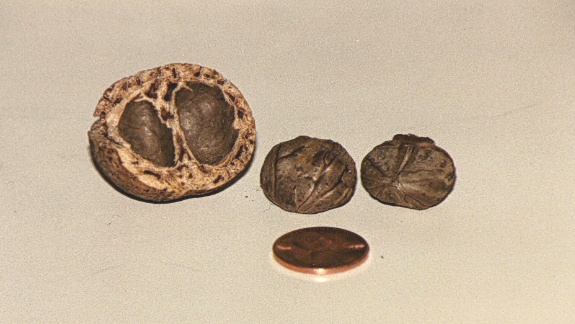
Mongongo nut, with US penny for scale

Mongongo nuts are a staple diet in some areas, most notably among the San people of northern Botswana and Namibia. Archaeological evidence has shown that they have been consumed by the San communities for centuries. Their popularity stems in part from their flavor, and in part from the fact that they store well, and remain edible for much of the year.

Dry fruits are first steamed to soften the skins. After peeling, the fruits are then cooked in water until the maroon-colored flesh separates from the hard inner nuts. The pulp is eaten, and the nuts are saved to be roasted later. Alternatively, nuts are collected from elephant dung; the hard nuts survive intact through the digestive process after the elephant has consumed and digested them. Once dry, the outer shell cracks easily, revealing the nut, encased within a soft inner shell. The nuts are either eaten intact, or pounded as ingredients in other dishes.

The oil from the nuts has also been traditionally used as a body rub in the dry winter months to clean and moisten the skin. The wood, being both strong and light, makes excellent fishing floats, toys, insulating material and drawing boards.

== In culture ==
In 1968, Canadian anthropologist Richard Borshay Lee wrote:

A diet based on mongongo nuts is in fact more reliable than one based on cultivated foods, and it is not surprising, therefore, that when a Bushman was asked why he hadn't taken to agriculture, he replied: "Why should we plant when there are so many mongongo nuts in the world?"

== See also ==
- Post-scarcity economy
