= Ngalawa =

Traditional Swahili outrigger canoe

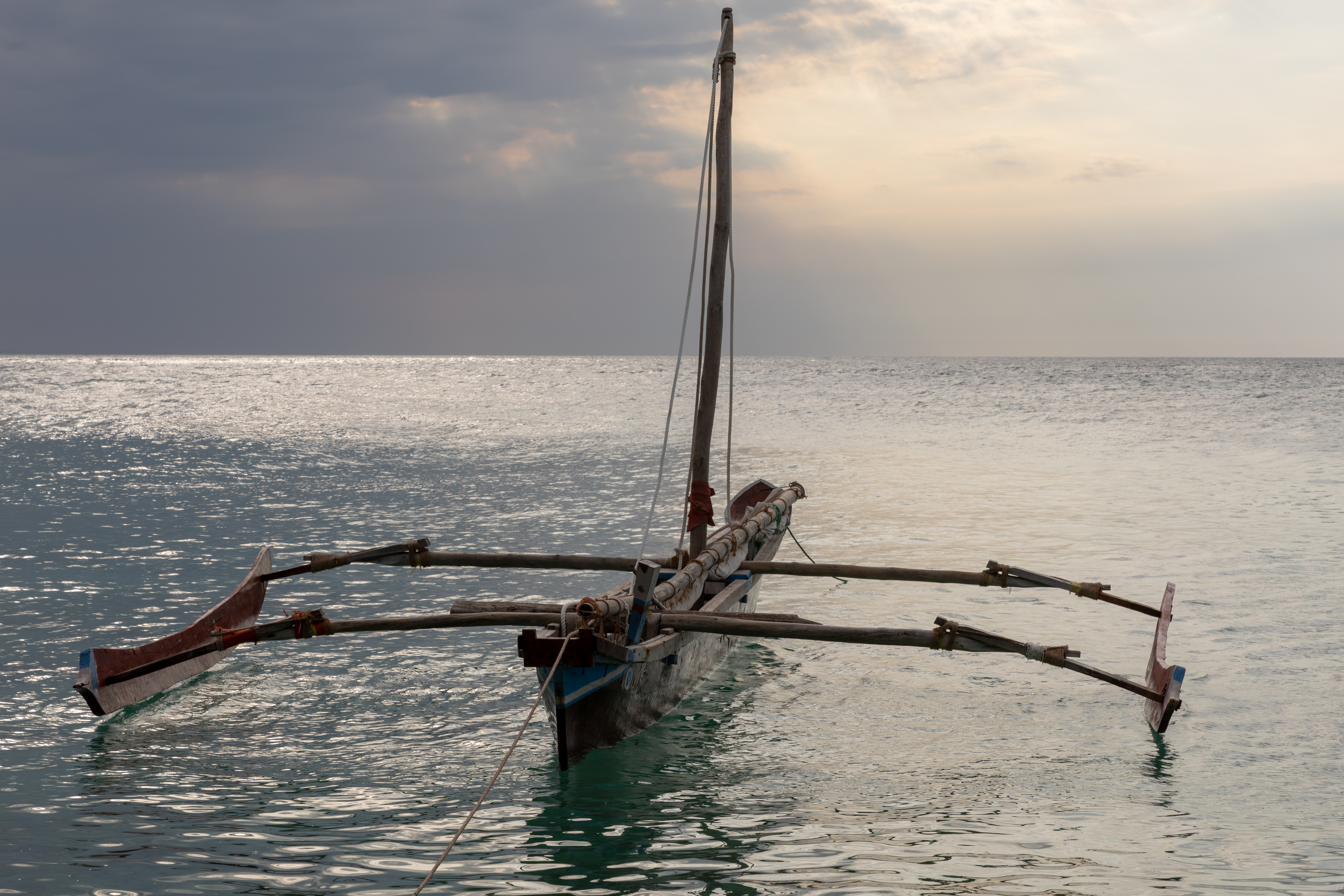
Ngalawa from Chumbe Island, Tanzania

The ngalawa or ungalawa is a traditional, double-outrigger canoe of the Swahili people living in Zanzibar and the Tanzanian coast. It is usually 5–6 m long and has two outriggers, a centrally-placed mast (often inclining slightly towards the prow) and a single triangular sail. It is used for short-distance transport of goods or people, as well as a coastal fishing boat. It can be classified as a variation of another common type of Swahili canoe known as ''mtumbwi''.

The name and the outrigger technology was adapted from the outrigger lakana of the Austronesian Malagasy people of Madagascar.

== See also ==
- Outrigger canoe
- Trimaran
