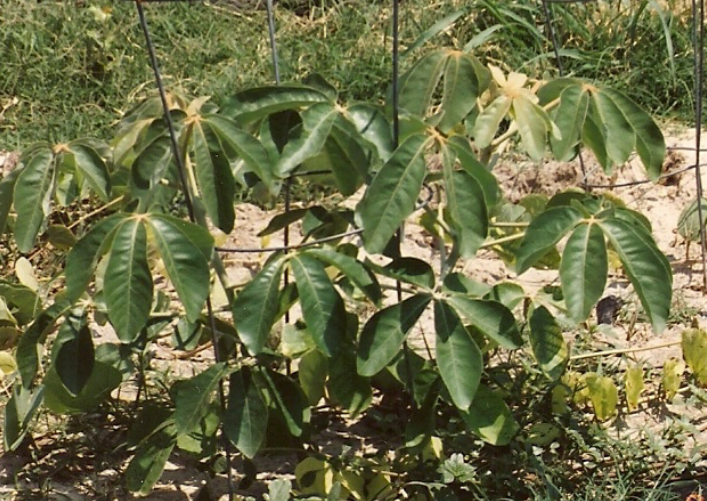
- Schinziophyton rautanenii seedling

Scientific classification
- Kingdom: Plantae
- Clade: Tracheophytes
- Clade: Angiosperms
- Clade: Eudicots
- Clade: Rosids
- Order: Malpighiales
- Family: Euphorbiaceae
- Subfamily: Crotonoideae
- Tribe: Ricinodendreae

Genera
- Givotia; Ricinodendron; Schinziophyton

= Ricinodendreae =

Tribe of flowering plants

Ricinodendreae is a tribe of the subfamily Crotonoideae, under the family Euphorbiaceae. It comprises 3 genera.

- Givotia Griff. (from east Africa, Madagascar, India and Sri Lanka),
  - Givotia gosai Radcl.-Sm.
  - Givotia madagascariensis Baill.
  - Givotia moluccana (L.) Sreem.
  - Givotia stipularis Radcl.-Sm.
- Ricinodendron Müll.Arg. (from Tropical Africa),
  - Ricinodendron heudelotii (Baill.) Heckel
- Schinziophyton Hutch. ex Radcl.Sm. (from Angola, Botswana, Malawi, Mozambique, Namibia, Tanzania, Zambia, Zaïre and Zimbabwe),
  - Schinziophyton rautanenii (Schinz) Radcl.-Sm.

Notable species include mongongo (Schinziophyton rautanenii) and njangsa (Ricinodendron heudelotii).

== Phylogeny ==
According to the Open Tree of Life, phylogenetic analysis suggests the following relationships amongst genera.

- Baliospermum
- Ricinodendreae
  - Schinziophyton
  - - Givotia
    - Ricinodendron

== See also ==
- Taxonomy of the Euphorbiaceae
