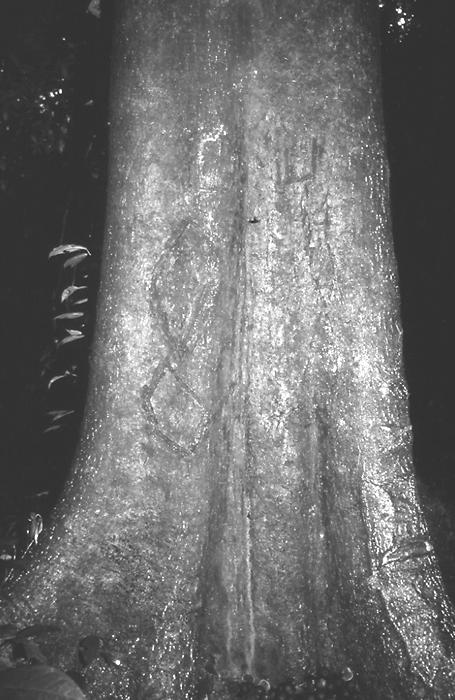

Conservation status
- Least Concern (IUCN 3.1)

Scientific classification
- Kingdom: Plantae
- Clade: Tracheophytes
- Clade: Angiosperms
- Clade: Eudicots
- Clade: Rosids
- Order: Malpighiales
- Family: Euphorbiaceae
- Subfamily: Crotonoideae
- Tribe: Ricinodendreae
- Genus: Ricinodendron; Müll. Arg.
- Species: R. heudelotii

Binomial name
- Ricinodendron heudelotii (Baill.) Heckel

Subspecies and varieties
- Ricinodendron heudelotii subsp. africanum (Müll.Arg.) J.Léonard; Ricinodendron heudelotii var. tomentellum (Hutch. & E.A.Bruce) Radcl.-Sm.

Synonyms
- Barrettia Sim; Jatropha heudelotii Baill.; Ricinodendron africanum Müll.Arg.; Ricinodendron gracilius Mildbr.; Barrettia umbrosa Sim; Ricinodendron tomentellum Hutch. & E.A.Bruce; Ricinodendron schliebenii Mildbr.; Ricinodendron heudelotii subsp. heudelotii

= Ricinodendron =

Genus of trees

Ricinodendron is a plant genus in the family Euphorbiaceae first described as a genus in 1864. It includes only one known species, Ricinodendron heudelotii, native to tropical Africa from Senegal + Liberia east to Sudan and Tanzania and south to Mozambique and Angola. It produces an economically important oilseed. The tree is known as munguella (Angola), njangsa (Cameroon), bofeko (Democratic Republic of Congo), wama (Ghana), okhuen (Nigeria), kishongo (Uganda), akpi (Ivory Coast), djansang, ọrùnmọdò (Yorubaland), essang, ezezang and njasang. Two varieties of the tree species are recognized R. heudelotii var. heudelotii in Ghana and R. heudelotii var. africanum in Nigeria and westwards.

== Taxonomy ==
The mongongo fruit (Schinziophyton rautanenii) was previously considered a member of this genus but has since been placed into a genus of its own.

Subspecies and varieties

1. Ricinodendron heudelotii subsp. africanum (Müll.Arg.) J.Léonard - tropical Africa from Nigeria east to Sudan and Tanzania and south to Mozambique and Angola
2. Ricinodendron heudelotii var. tomentellum (Hutch. & E.A.Bruce) Radcl.-Sm. - Kenya, Tanzania

Formerly included

moved to Schinziophyton

1. R. rautanenii - Schinziophyton rautanenii
2. R. viticoides - Schinziophyton rautanenii

== Description ==
The tree is fast growing and reaches a height between 20 and 50 m with a straight trunk which can have a diameter up to 2.7 m. Its crown is broad and the roots are big running. The bark is smooth with a grey colour. Inside, the bark is red when cut.

Njangsa is a dioecious plant. The flowers are yellowish white, 5 mm long and form a long terminal panicle which measures between 15 and 40 cm. Flowering time is between April and May. Male panicles are larger and slender than female flowers.

Njangsa trees produce a fruit that are typically two or three lobed and contain two cells in which the seeds lie. These seeds are red brown to black, rounded and some 1 cm in diameter. The seeds are oily in texture and can be bought either raw or dried. They have an odour reminiscent of oily chocolate, but their flavour is truly unique: subtly aromatic with a mild bitter aftertaste. At maturity (August - September) the fruit smells like over-ripe apples.

== Distribution ==
Njangsa is endemic to tropical Africa. The native geographic location of njangsa reaches from Senegal in West Africa to Sudan, Uganda, and Tanzania, and from Sudan down to the western coast of Sub-Saharan Africa to Angola. The tree is also found on Madagascar.

Njangsa grows generally in rain forests and is also typical for secondary forests. This tree is a light-demanding species. Therefore, it can also be found in deciduous forests, forest edges, secondary scrubs and thickets in semi-dry savannahs. The tree is observed in food crop fields, cocoa farms and other agroforestry systems, where the trees can also intentionally be planted.

== Uses and benefits ==
=== Food-value ===
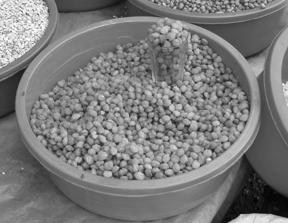
Njansang is widely traded in Central and West Africa

The edible parts of the plant are the high nutritive contents of the kernels. The dried and ground kernels are used as a flavouring agent in some dishes in West and Central Africa. The paste of the ground kernels is used to thicken soups and stews. Oil can be obtained from the kernels. Only a small amount of extracted seed oil is carried out. The oil has a yellowish colour and tastes similar to groundnut oil. Because of its high content of γ-tocopherol, the oil is very stable and becomes rancid only slowly. This oil is useful for cooking oil and margarine.

Constituent	Quantity (%)
Water	3.1 +/- 0.8
Fatty acid	47.4-55.30
Crude protein	24.3-65.2
Total carbohydrates	5.6-9.3
Digestible carbohydrates	5.6-9.3
Crude fibres	8.9-9.3
Ash	10.5-17.8
Nitrogen	8.6 +/- 0.9
Dry extracts	97.8
pH	7.84
Energy value	495 kcal/100g

Constituens of seeds

==== Culinary use ====
The seeds are usually dried for use as a flavouring agent in West and Central African food dishes. The whole seeds are pounded in a pestle and mortar and the paste of ground seed is added as a thickener for soups and stews, or crumbled over rice as a flavouring. The spice from the seed is also sold in African markets, rolled into sausage shapes.

=== Medicinal value ===
The extract from the bark of the tree is used by traditional doctors as an antidote against poison because the extracts are said to contain lupeol. It is also used to cure various diseases as cough, malaria, yellow fever, stomach pain, rheumatism etc. Other characteristics are aphrodisiac and anti-inflammatory properties. Seed husk and latex, leaf decoction and sap are also used to treat divers illnesses.

=== Ecological value ===
Presence of njangsa helps to improve soil quality because the roots are colonized by mycorrhizae and because of its natural leaf litter. Burned kernel shells deliver potassium rich ash and the cake remaining after oil extraction from seeds has high nitrogen content. Both products can be used as fertilizer. Njangsa provides shade for humans, livestock and crops. Leaves can be used as fodder for livestock during dry seasons.

=== Industrial uses ===
Oil obtained from dried kernel and ash can be used for soap and varnish production.

=== Social and historical implications ===
In southern Cameroon, dried seeds are used for oware, a traditional mancala game called songho in Cameron; in the Igbo language of Nigeria, both the game and the tree go by the name of okwe . In Sierra Leone the seeds are used for rattles for bundu dances.

== Production ==
=== Cultivation area ===
The main production area of njangsa is the humid forest zone of Cameroon. The tree is one of the most common seedlings seen in the more open parts of the forest. Consequently, the species is abundant in new farming clearings. During these clearings, farmers kept trees from this species.

=== Yields ===
The kernel is economically the most important part of the tree. They are collected from the ground between September and October. Njangsa trees typically produce fruit every two to three years, however some trees produce them in less than a year. Each harvest yields up to 900 fruits and an average of 72 kg of kernels.

=== Cultivars ===
Njangsa is a new crop and only actively domesticated since 1995. The knowledge about the genetic diversity is therefore limited. Today, available information about genetic resources is so little that most improvements occur by plant breeding.

=== Climate and soil requirement ===
Climatic condition	Minimum	Maximum
Altitude (m)	100	1250
Rainfall (mm)	1000	<3000
Temperature (°C)	18	32

Climatic requirement

Characteristics	Suitable habitat
Soil type (texture)	Medium textured ultisols and oxisols
Topography	Lowlands
Rooting depth	Freely draining
Soil pH	Acidic, pH 5-6

Soil requirements

Best germination success can be observed on a mixture of river sand and forest soil with a ratio of 1:3.

=== Cultivation technique ===
==== Propagation ====
Propagation of njangsa is possible by seeds, by vegetative propagation, or by grafting. The advantage of propagation by seeds is that the tree develops a strong taproot. This is important for the stability of the tree as well as for big exploration zone for water and nutrient uptake. Because njangsa is dioecious, it is difficult to identify male and female trees before the reproductive phase. Because of high genetic variability, seeds may have different characteristics compared to the parent plant. Vegetative propagation allows reproducing trees with exactly the same characteristics as the selected female tree. Njangsa can also be propagated by grafting. A shoot or bud (the scion) is united with an already established rootstock.

==== Field establishment ====
The site should be cleared, especially if the trees are associated with other food crops. Then the young plants can be planted in planting holes separated by 10 m from each other. Before transplanting the plants, they need to spend at least six months under shade and need a minimal size of 20–30 cm. After planting, a 1 m high fence of palm fronds for shade should be established for the first two weeks.

==== Plant management ====
Water: The plants need to be watered abundantly after transplanting so that the plant can adapt to the new environment. To avoid high water losses by evaporation, a mulch layer can keep soil moisture.

Fertilizer: The establishment and development of this fast growing tree can be improved by supplying it with enough nutrients through mineral fertilizer.

Husbandry: As long as the plant is young, weeding is very important to reduce competition for water and nutrients, so that a fast growth and development is possible.

Pest and disease control: No major disease are observed yet. But njangsa can be attacked by herbivores as caterpillars (Lobobunaea phaedusa, Imbrasia petiveri, Imbrasia obscura, Imbrasia melanops). These caterpillars are edible and are therefore not treated with chemicals but collected as source of food protein. Aphids can infest plants in nurseries. They are easy to detect because the leaves curl as result of an attack. These aphids can be controlled with a systemic insecticide. Once the trees are in the field for more than two years, treatments are no more necessary because of plant vigor.

=== Harvest and postharvest treatment ===
First fruit harvest occurs after 6 to 7 years in forests or after 3 to 4 years in managed plantations. The fruits are picked up by hand from the ground once they are ripe enough to drop from the tree (September and October). To facilitate harvest, the ground under the tree should be cleared. Once harvested, the fruits are placed on a pile for two to three weeks so that the pulp is rotting faster and the seeds can be extracted easily.

Extracting the kernel from the pulp is a time-consuming process because of their hard shape. After boiling them in water, and cooling them down, the kernels are extracted one by one with a knife or nails. Then the kernels are sun or fire dried. Njangsa is stored as seed or as kernel. If they are well dried, they can be stored up to two years on a dry place.
