= Eileen Adelaide Bruce =

British botanist (1905–1955)

- Born: 15 February 1905; Petersham, London
- Died: 6 October 1955 (aged 50); Kingston-upon-Thames, London

Eileen Adelaide Bruce (15 February 1905 Petersham, London – 6 October 1955 London) was an English taxonomist and botanist. She worked at Kew Gardens and at the South African National Herbarium in Pretoria. She researched a number of plant families, in particular the Labiatae, a revision of the genus Kniphofia, and the families of Pedaliaceae and Loganiaceae.

== Early life and education ==
Bruce was born in Petersham on 15 February 1905, and attended Francis Holland School in London. She kept a framed family tree in her house showing her descent from Robert the Bruce. After finishing school, she earned a BSc from the University College of London, studying under Professor Edward Salisbury.

== Career ==
She joined the staff of Kew Gardens in 1930, where she worked as an Assistant Botanist, working on the phanerogams from tropical Africa. In 1941, after the start of World War II, she enlisted in the Auxiliary Territorial Service, was commissioned and went on to serve in the Anti-Aircraft Command. After the end of hostilities, she was appointed to the South African National Herbarium in Pretoria in 1946. During her six years there she worked on a number of plant families, in particular the Labiatae and also on a revision of the genus Kniphofia. Her work was published in Bothalia and Flowering Plants of Africa.

In the early 1950s, she returned to Kew as a Scientific Officer in the Herbarium, working on the families of Pedaliaceae and Loganiaceae, contributing to the Flora of Tropical East Africa and the Kew Bulletin.

== Death and legacy ==
After being diagnosed with cancer in 1954, she received treatment and continued working. In October 1955, she underwent an operation, after which she died.

The Archives of the Royal Botanic Gardens, Kew, hold some of her correspondence to E Milne-Redhead and N D Simpson, as well as her notebook and papers on a 1937 botanical tour to the Corsican Mountains.
