= Givotia madagascariensis =

Scientific classification
- Kingdom: Plantae
- Clade: Tracheophytes
- Clade: Angiosperms
- Clade: Eudicots
- Clade: Rosids
- Order: Malpighiales
- Family: Euphorbiaceae
- Genus: Givotia
- Species: G. madagascariensis

Binomial name
- Givotia madagascariensis Baill.

Species of flowering plant

Givotia madagascariensis, locally known as farafatsy, is a commercially valuable softwood tree endemic to the southwestern Madagascar province formally known as Toliara Province.

It is in the genus Givotia of the family Euphorbiaceae. Locals use it in building canoes and in folk medicine, and it has been investigated for antitumor substances.
