= Treenailed boat =

Historical Baltic maritime vessel

The treenailed boat is a boat model used in Northern Europe, usually associated with Vikings but should perhaps be ascribed to Pomeranian groups. The shape and construction coincides with the sewn boats, but instead of ropes, it is assembled with wooden treenails.

== See also ==
- Lashed-lug boat
- Mtepe
