= Mtepe =

Ancient boat

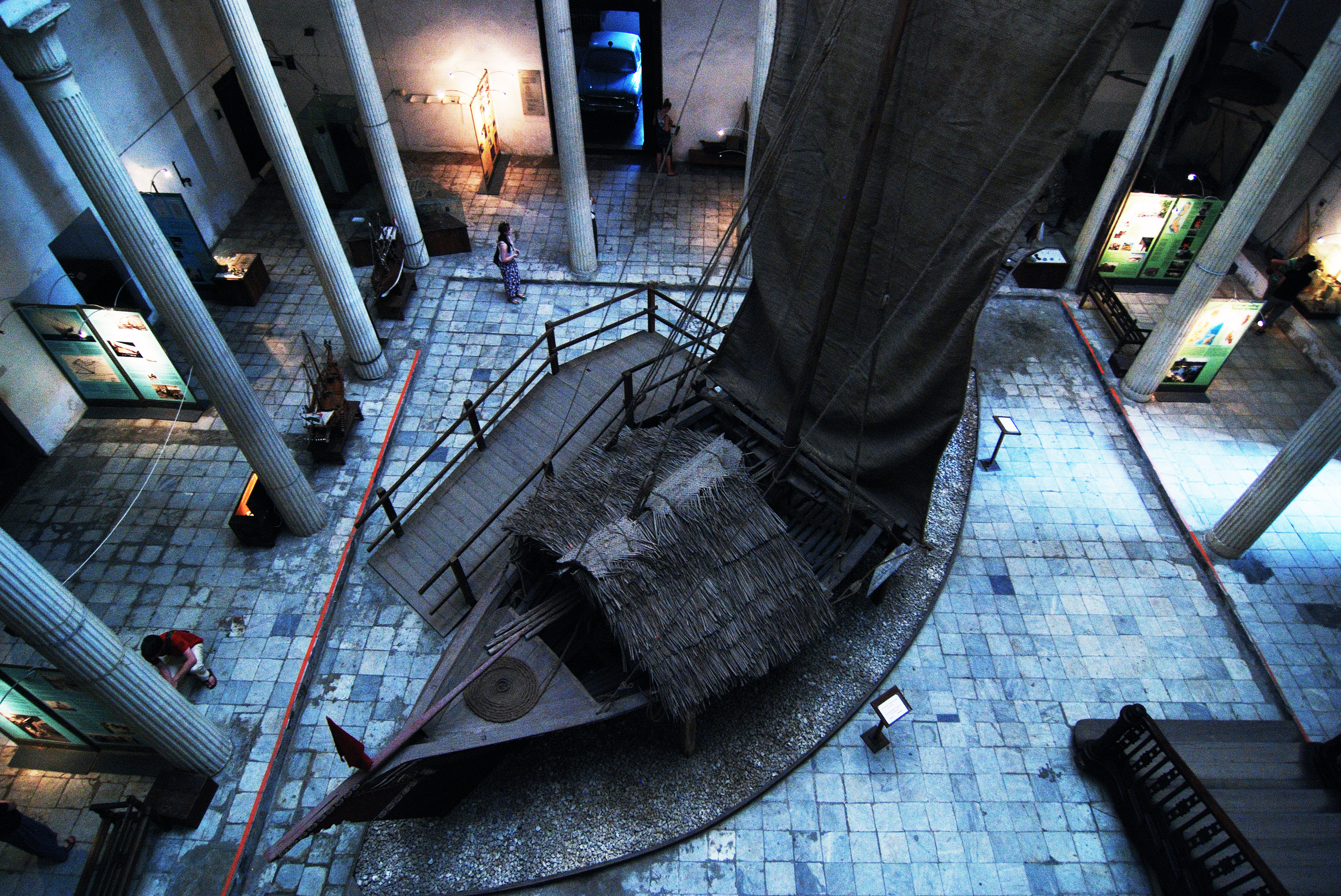
Shungwaya: an inexact replica mtepe built in 2003 and displayed at the House of Wonders Museum in Stone Town, Zanzibar.

The mtepe is a boat associated with the Swahili people (the word "boat" in the Bantu Swahili language being mtepe). The mtepe's planks are held together by wooden pegs and coir (Note: ie. coconut fibers), so it is a sewn boat designed to be flexible (Note: They are in this manner similar to traditional lashed Polynesian craft, whose flexible construction techniques have in part been carried forward to modern cruising designs and championed by James Wharram.) in contrast to the rigid vessels of western technique.

== Extinction ==
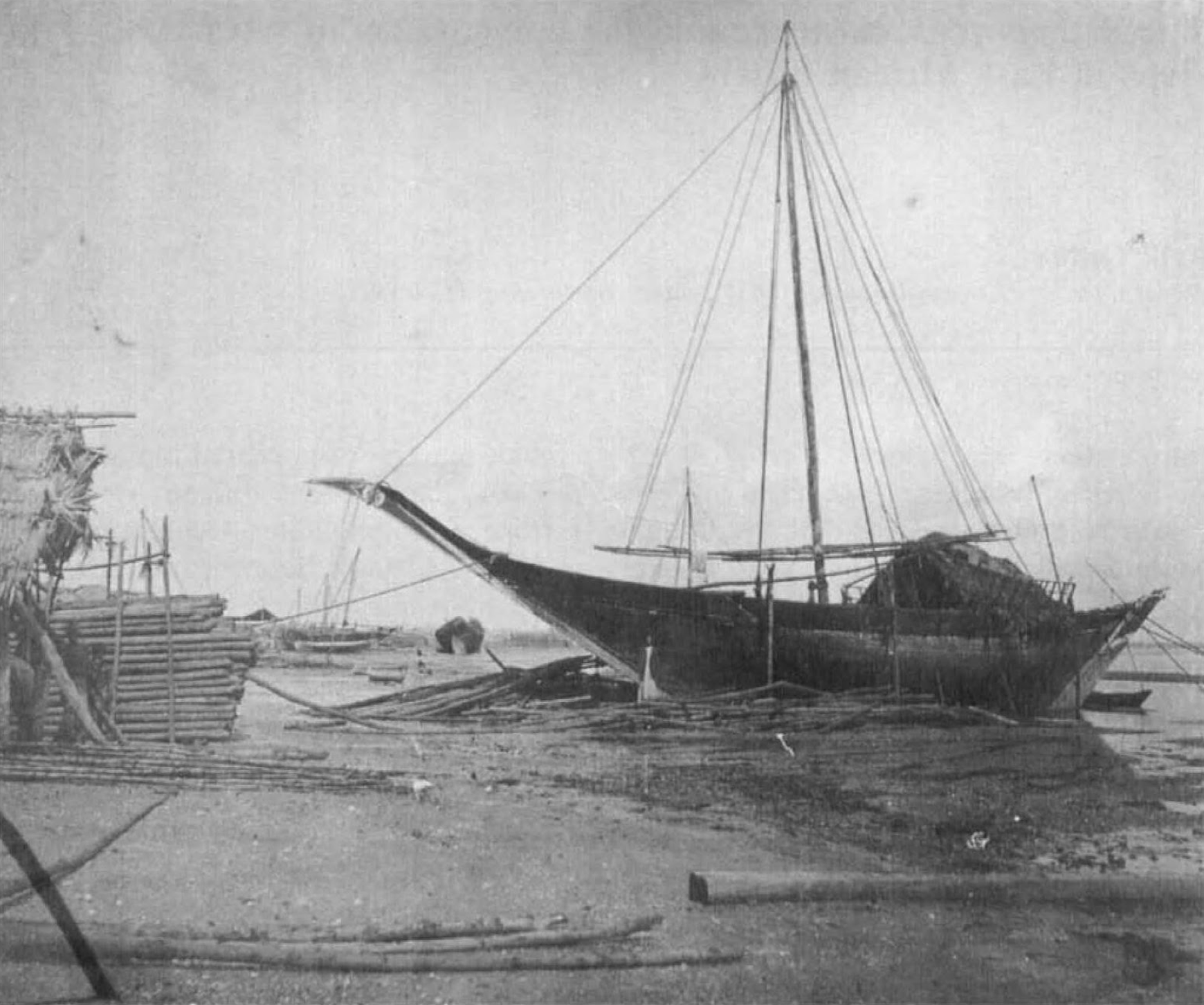
mtepe on the beach at Zanzibar, circa 1890.

The cessation of the production of mtepe has been ascribed to the arrival of the Portuguese in the Indian Ocean in the 15th century, leading to boat builders adopting alternative, western shipbuilding techniques.

== Preservation ==
Nearly a dozen photographs and nine known model mtepe have been preserved. Three models are kept at the Fort Jesus Museum, a Portuguese fort built in 1591 located on Mombasa Island, Kenya. One model is kept at the Lamu Museum, 150 mi (240 km) north. One model is kept at the National Maritime Museum, Greenwich, London. One model is kept at the Science Museum, Kensington, London.

== See also ==
- Lashed-lug boat
- Treenailed boat
- Sewn boat
- Swahili culture
