= Balangay =

Type of lashed-lug boat

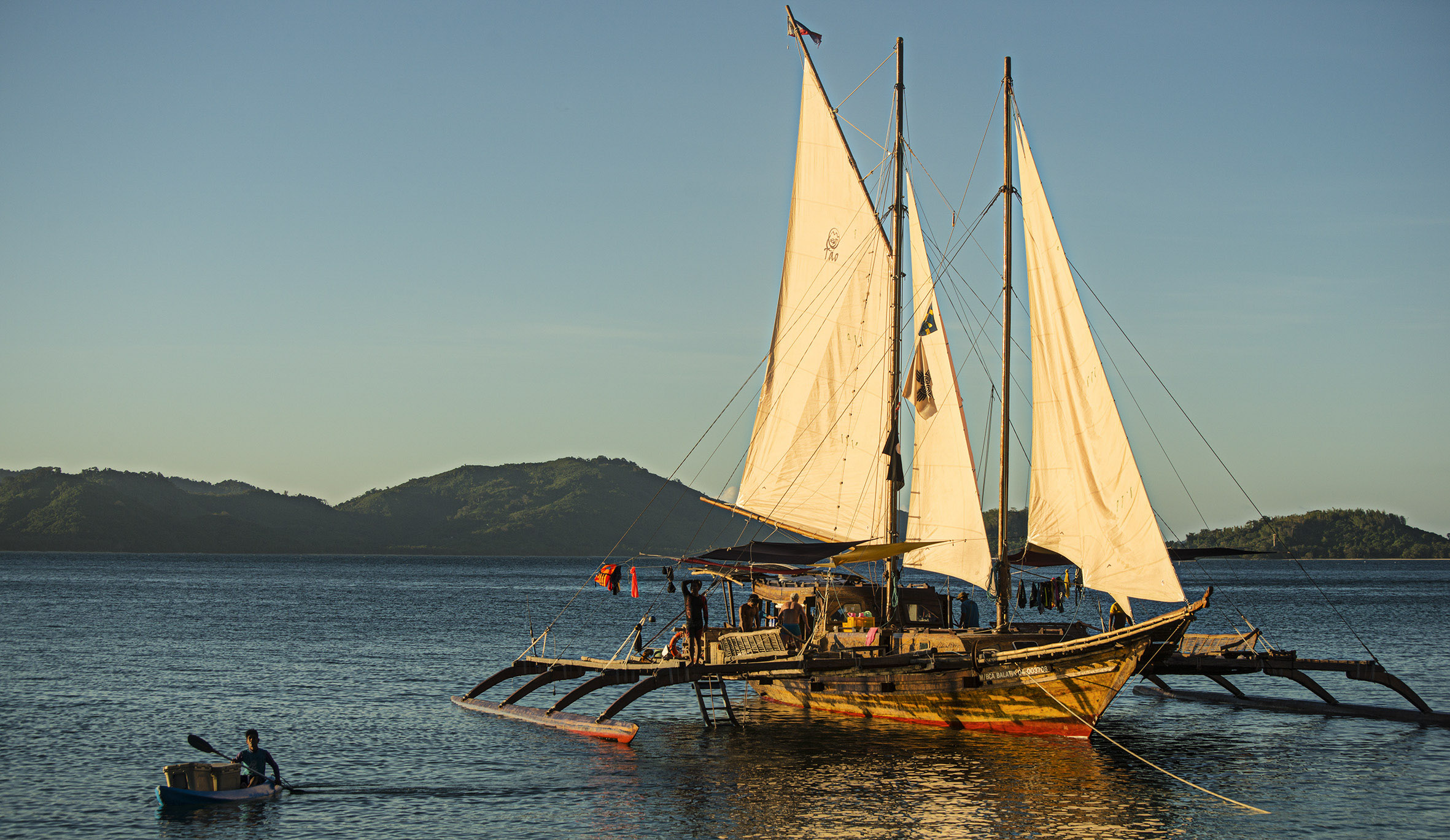
The Balatik of the Tao Expedition of Palawan, a reconstruction of a large sailing paraw, which is essentially a typical Visayan balangay with large double outriggers. It is gaff rigged, which is European.

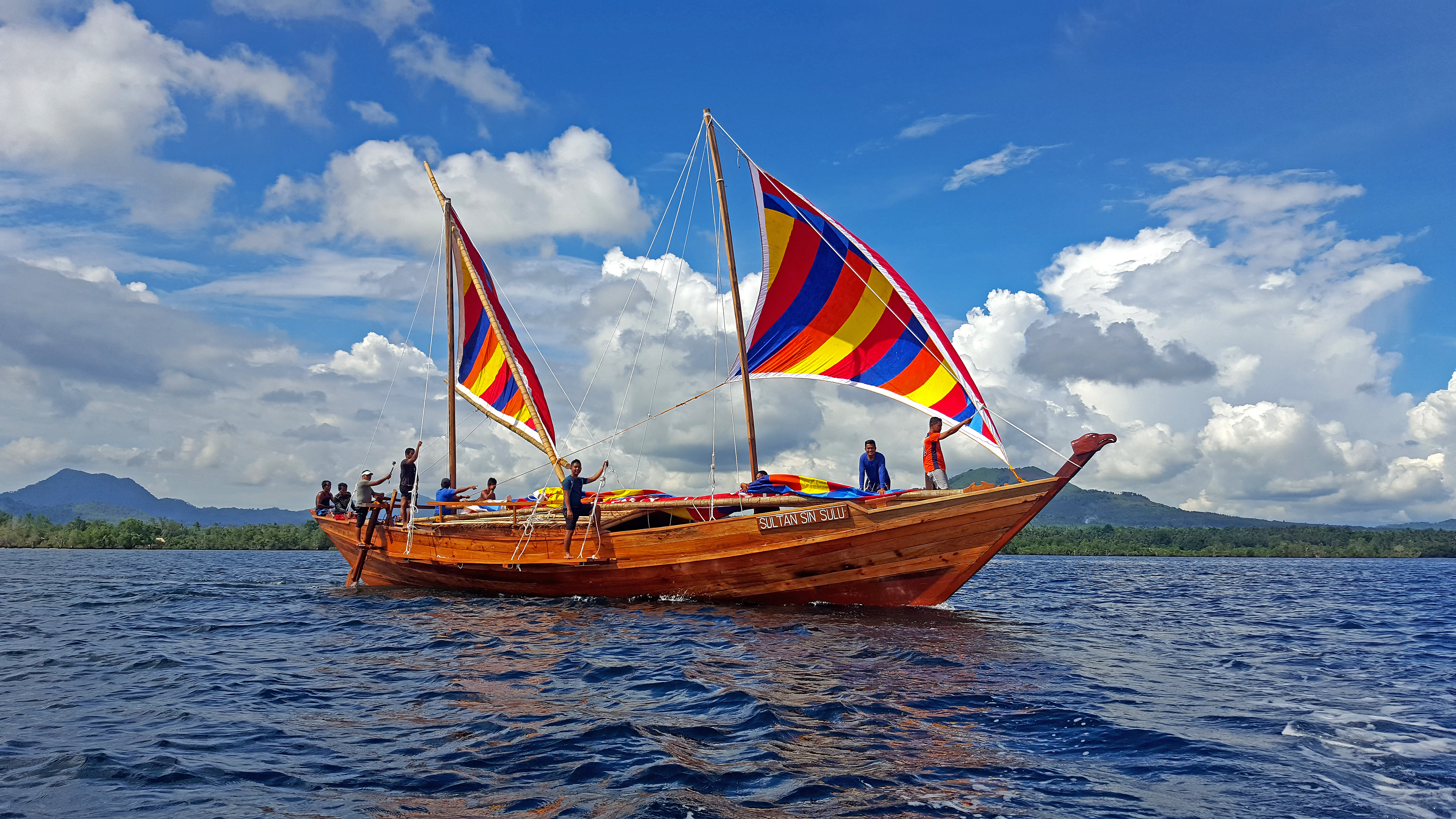
The balangay Sultan sin Sulu in Maimbung, Sulu. These replicas are meant to recreate the Butuan boats, but are inaccurate in that they do not have outriggers or Austronesian rigs.

A balangay, or barangay, is a type of lashed-lug boat built by joining planks edge-to-edge using pins, dowels, and fiber lashings. They are found throughout the Philippines and were used largely as trading ships up until the colonial era. The oldest known balangay are the eleven Butuan boats, which have been carbon-dated individually from 689 to 988 CE and were recovered from several sites in Butuan, Agusan del Norte. The Butuan boats are the single largest concentration of lashed-lug boat remains of the Austronesian boatbuilding traditions. They are found in association with large amounts of trade goods from East Asia, Southeast Asia, and as far as Persia, indicating they traded as far as the Middle East.

Balangay were the first wooden watercraft excavated in Southeast Asia. Balangay are celebrated annually in the Balanghai Festival of Butuan.

== Names ==
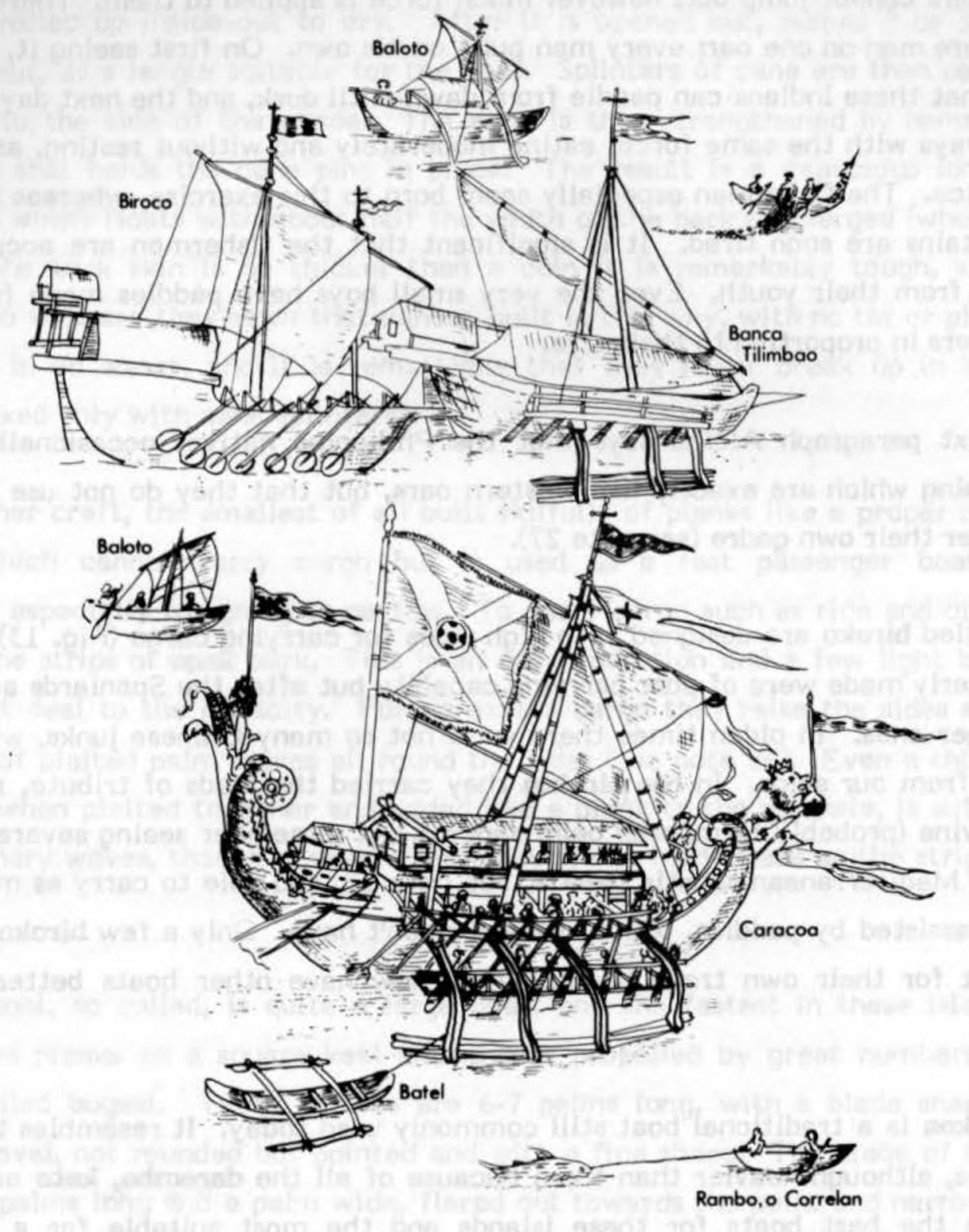
Visayan biroko, baloto, and tilimbao (upper half of illustration), along with the larger joangan warship, image traced from an illustration in the Historia de las Islas e Indios de Bisayas (1668)

Balangay was one of the first native words the Europeans learned in the Philippines. The Venetian chronicler Antonio Pigafetta, who was with Ferdinand Magellan when setting foot in the Philippines in 1521 called the native boats balangai or balanghai. This word appears as either balangay or barangay, with the same meaning, in all the major languages of the Philippines. Early colonial Spanish dictionaries make it clear that balangay and barangay were originally pronounced "ba-la-ngay" and "ba-ra-ngay", but due to centuries of Spanish influence, the modern barangay is pronounced "ba-rang-gay" in modern Filipino (/bɑːrɑːŋˈɡaɪ/, instead of precolonial /bɑːrɑːŋˈaɪ/). Pigafetta's alternate spelling with an H, balanghai, later gave rise to the historically incorrect neologism balanghay in the 1970s (with a new, slightly different pronunciation which Pigafetta did not intend).

The term was also used by the Tagalog people to refer to the smallest discrete political units, which came to be the term used for native villages under the Spanish colonial period. The name of the boat was usually Hispanicized in Spanish and American records as barangayan (plural: barangayanes) to distinguish them from the political unit.

Among the Ibanag people of Northern Luzon, balangay were known as barangay, a term sometimes extended to the crew. Large vessels were called biray or biwong.

In the Visayas and Mindanao, there are multiple names for balangay-type boats, including baloto (not to be confused with the balutu), baroto, biray, lapid, tilimbao (or tinimbao). Cargo-carrying versions of balangay with high sides and no outriggers (which necessitated the use of long oars instead of paddles) were also known as bidok, birok, or biroko (also spelled biroco) in the Visayas. The karakoa, a large Visayan warship, was also a type of balangay.

== History ==
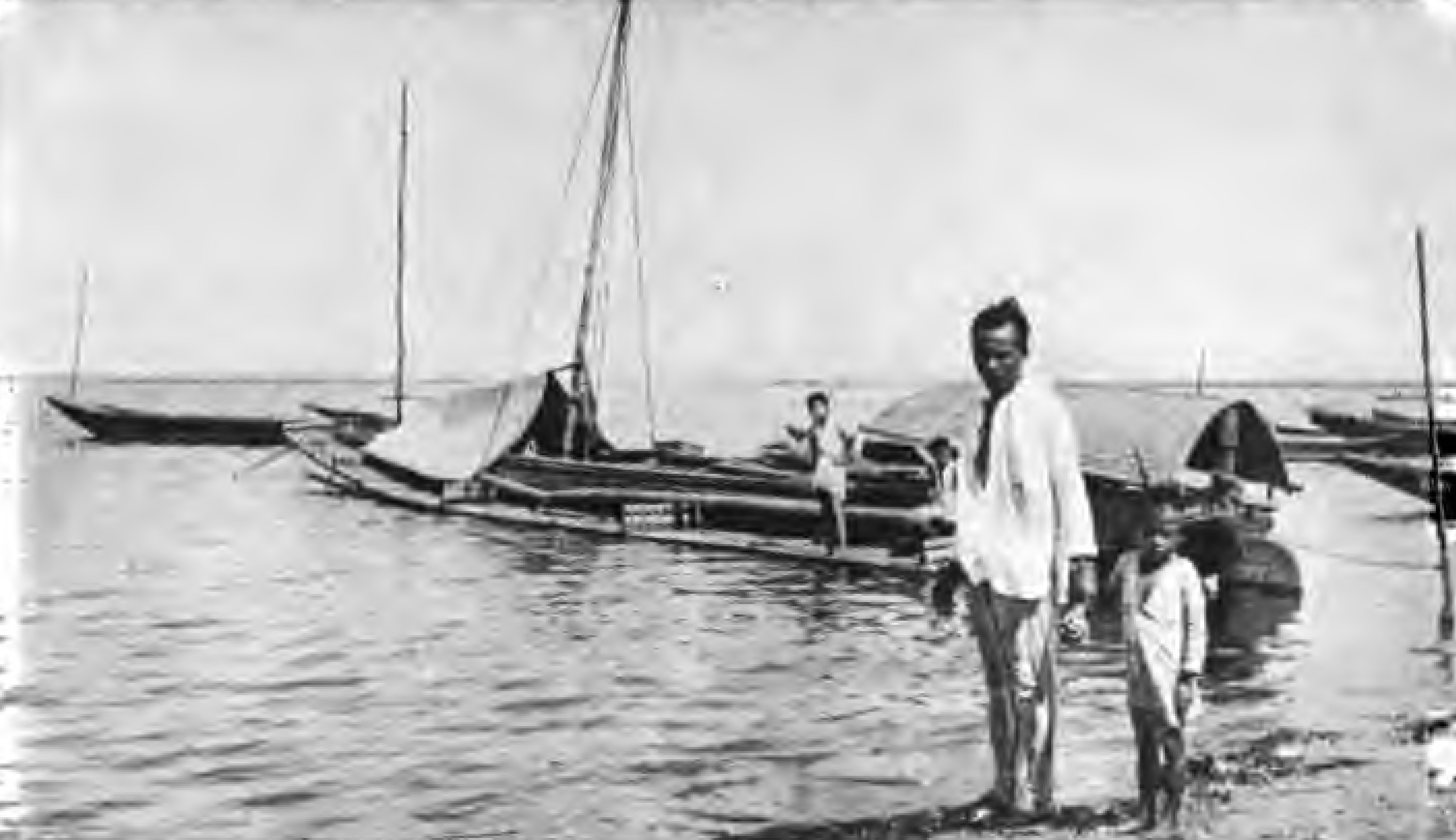
Ibanag balangay (barangayanes) from the Cagayan River in Northern Luzon (c.1917)

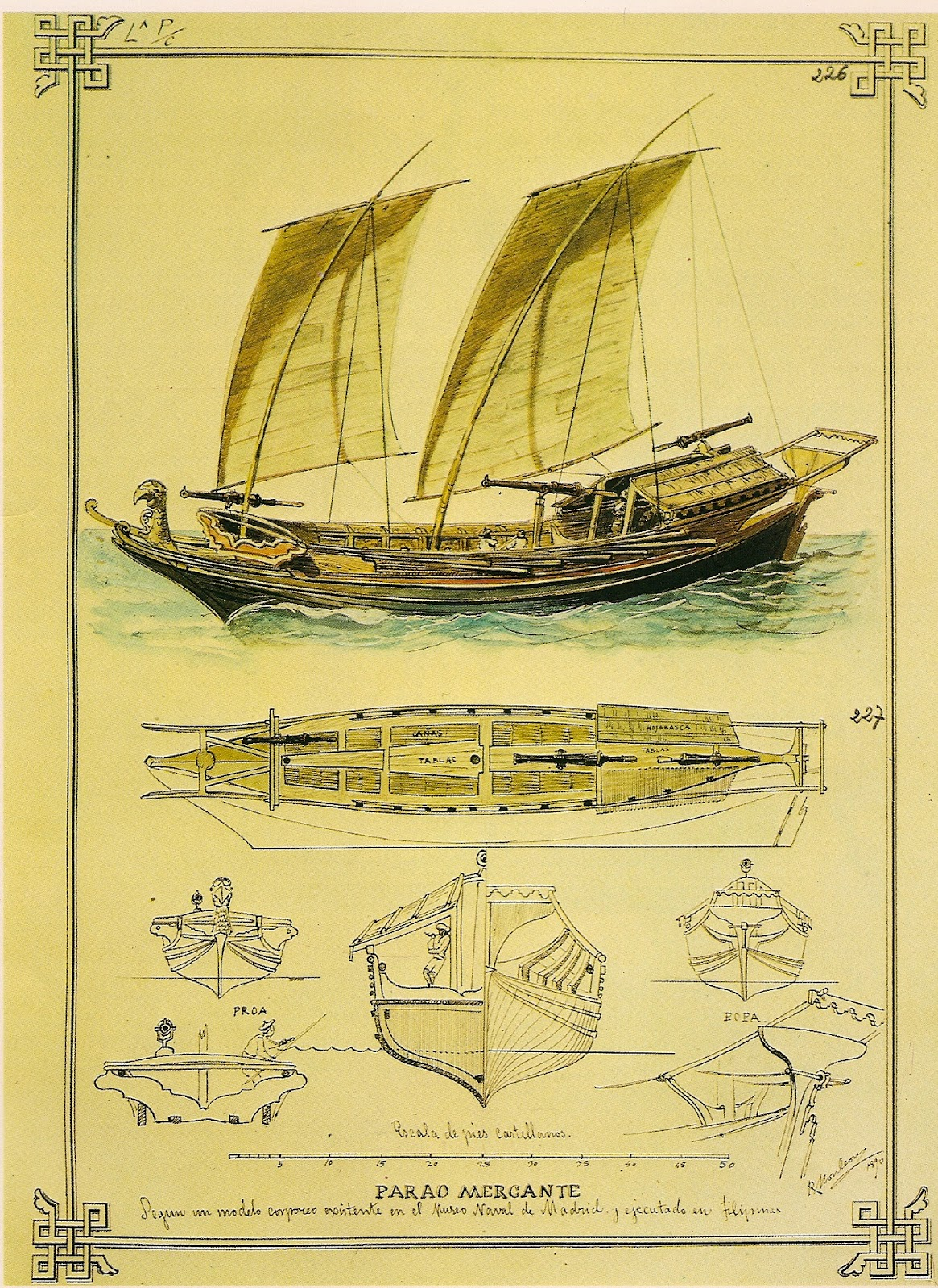
Illustration of an armed merchant biroko with tanja sails by Rafael Monleón (1890)

"Balangay" is a general term and thus applies to several different types of traditional boats in various ethnic groups in the Philippines. In common usage, it refers primarily to the balangay of the Visayas and Mindanao islands, which were primarily inter-island trading ships, cargo transports, and warships. Large balangay (especially warships), including the Butuan boats, are commonly equipped with large double-outriggers which support paddling and fighting platforms, in which case, they can be generically referred to as paraw or tilimbao (also tinimbao, from timbao, "outrigger"). Balangay warships, along with the larger karakoa, were regularly used for raiding (mangayaw) by Visayan warriors. It is believed that they may have been the "Pi-sho-ye" raiders described as regularly attacking Chinese settlements on the coast of Fujian in the 12th century AD.

"They (Visayans) have many kinds of ships of very different designs and names for fighting their wars and making their voyages. Most of the ones they use for wars and raiding are small; they are called barangay. And if they are a little bigger, they are called biray. The latter are very long and narrow, the smaller seating 50 and the larger ones 100, all of whom must row except the chief who is aboard the ship. The oars [sic] of these ships are a little more than a vara in length; their shafts are very well made. The oars are not fastened to the boat for rowing; instead the seated oarsmen ply gently with both hands. These vessels are extremely swift. They hold two or three banks of seated oarsmen on a side, provided there are enough people to fill them. And these banks are placed in counterweights (outriggers), which are made of a very large bamboo plant found on all the Philippine Islands of the West. These counterweights are placed on the outer sides of the vessel, where the oarsmen are seated comfortably. These vessels travel very safely with these counterweights because they cannot capsize, and the counterweights also allow them to travel in heavy seas because the ship is elevated above the level of the water, so the waves break against the counterweights and not against the boats. They have round sails like ours."

"They have other ships they call birocos, these are much larger than the ones mentioned earlier, some capable of carrying 500 or 600 fanegas of wheat. They are also oared, but they are very long and are moored to the ship like ours, and are of a different design. These are the biggest of their boats; the rest are small and are called by many different names and have different designs and need not be described here because they are unimportant."

— Anonymous, Boxer Codex (c.1590)

In Tagalog regions, the balangay or barangay has the same functions as in the southern islands but differ in that it is constructed through the sewn-plank technique, rather than through dowels.

In the province of Cagayan in Northern Luzon, the balangay of the Ibanag people were predominantly used within the Cagayan River system, but were also sometimes used as coastal trade ships, reaching as far as the Ilocos Region. They were mainly used as cargo and fishing ships and differed from other balangay in being much smaller with a shallower draft.

=== Marina Sutil ===
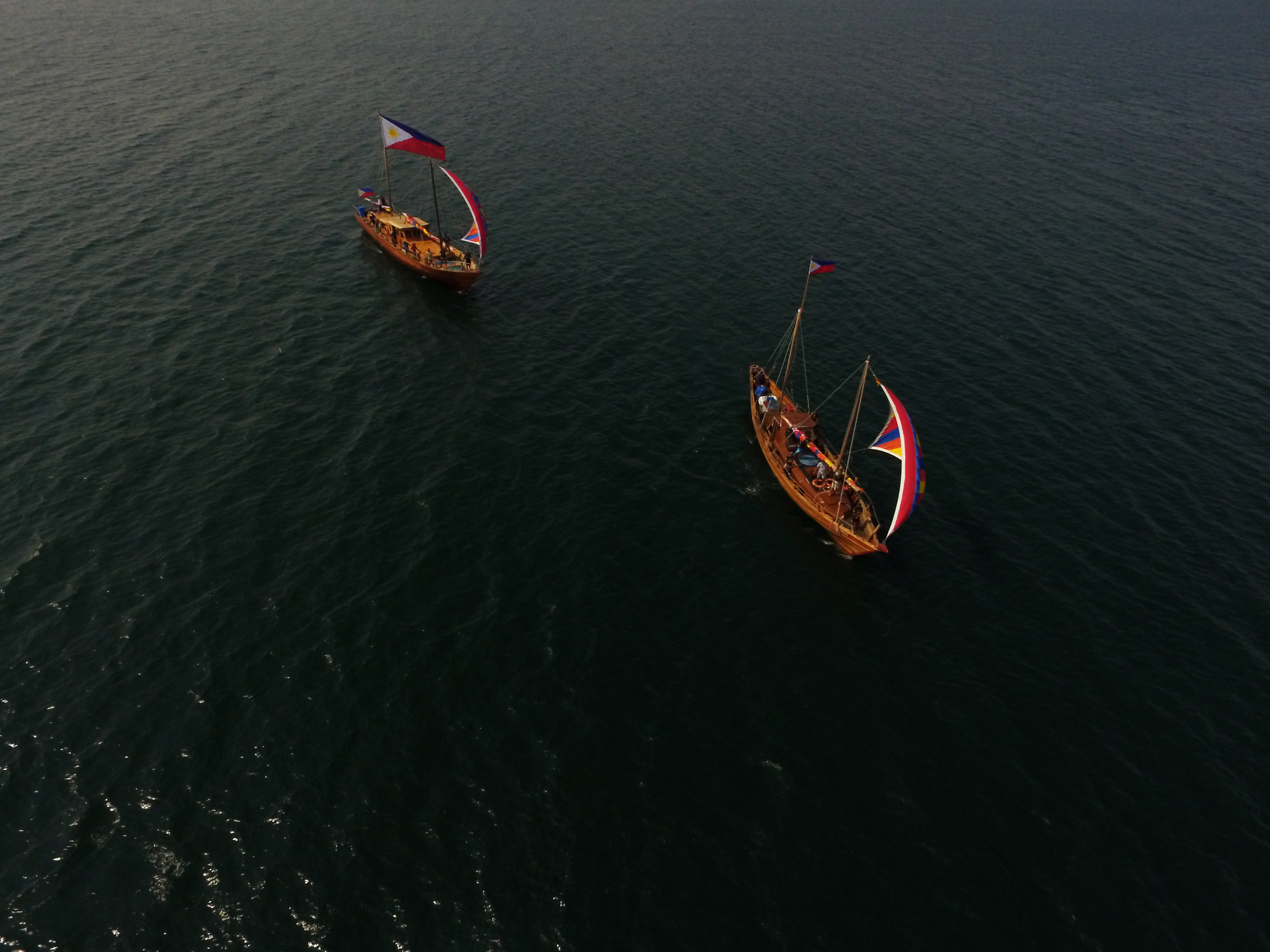
Balangay boats viewed from the air

During the 18th to 19th centuries, balangay were also often used as warships for defending coastal villages from Moro and Dutch raiders during the Moro Wars, in conjunction with watchtowers (castillo, baluarte, or bantáy) and other fortifications. The raiders were regularly attacking coastal settlements in Spanish-controlled areas and carrying off inhabitants to be sold as slaves in markets as far as Batavia and the Sultanate of Gowa. Defense fleets of balangay and vinta (known as the Marina Sutil, "Light Navy" or "Defense Navy") were first organized under Governor-General José Basco y Vargas in 1778. They were lightly armed but fast, which made them ideal for responding quickly to raider sightings and attacks.

Notable leaders of these defense squadrons include Don Pedro Estevan, a principalía of Tabaco, Albay; and Julián Bermejo, an Augustinian friar who commanded ten balangay and established an alarm system using a line of small relay forts in southern Cebu. They were responsible for several major naval victories against Moro raiders from the late 18th to the early 19th centuries. The most significant was the Battle of Tabogon Bay (modern Tabgon, Caramoan) in 1818, where the combined fleets of Estevan and Don José Blanco defeated around forty Moro warships led by Prince Nune, the son of a sultan from Mindanao. Nune escaped, but hundreds of Moro raiders died in the skirmish and around a thousand more were stranded and hunted down in the mountains of Caramoan. The 1818 victory led to increased usage of defense fleets and the reduction of Moro raids to only sporadic attacks on isolated fishermen or smaller villages until their eventual suppression in 1896.

== Construction ==
Balangay were basically lashed-lug plank boats put together by joining the carved out planks edge-to-edge. The prow and stern posts were also composed of V-shaped ("winged") single carved pieces of wood. The strakes were made from heartwood taken from the section in between the softer sapwood and the pith of trees. Tree species favored include doongon (Heritiera littoralis), lawaan (Shorea spp.), tugas (Vitex parviflora), and barayong (Afzelia rhomboidea), among others. The trees were traditionally cut on a moonlit night in accordance with local folk beliefs. A single tree usually produces two lengths of curving planks. Traditionally, the planks and other ship parts were shaped with straight (dalag) or curved (bintong) adzes hammered with a mallet called a pakang. The master shipwright is called a pandáy (similar to other craftsmen in Philippine cultures).

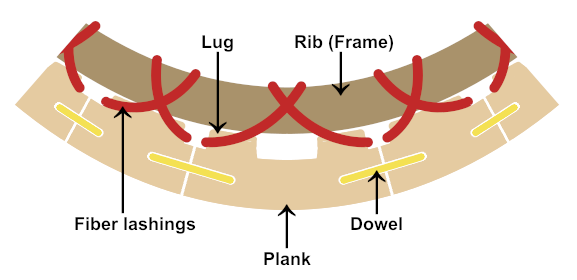
Generalized diagram (cross-section) of lashed-lug planking in Butuan Boat Two (Clark et al., 1993)

The balangay's keel is built first. Like most Austronesian ships (and in contrast to western ships), the keel is basically a dugout canoe (a bangka) made from a single log. The keel is also known as a baroto which is the origin of one of the alternative names for balangay in the Visayas. The Butuan balangay boats differ from later balangay designs in that they do not have a true keel. Instead, they have a central plank fitted with three parallel lines of thin lugs which serve as additional attachment points for lashings.

The outer shell of the hull is built first by fitting strakes on each side of the keel edge-to-edge (to a total of six or more). The shaping of these strakes into the appropriate curvature (lubag) requires a skilled pandáy. They are locked in place with wooden dowels or pins (treenails) around 19 cm (7.5 in) long slotted into holes drilled into the edges of the strakes. Some sections may necessitate the use of two or more planks for each strake. These are attached end-to-end using hooked scarf joints. Once the hull is assembled, it is left to season for a month or two.

After the wood is seasoned, the hull is taken apart once again and checked. It is then reassembled in a stage known as sugi ("matching"). This involves fitting the strakes back together. Once fitted, the space between the strakes is run through with a spoon-like implement called a lokob. This creates a space with an even thickness in between the two strakes. The space is then filled with fine palm fibers called baruk or barok and caulked with resin-based pastes. The dowels are also further secured by drilling holes into them through the planks with the help of marks inscribed beforehand. Counter pegs called pamuta are then hammered into these holes.

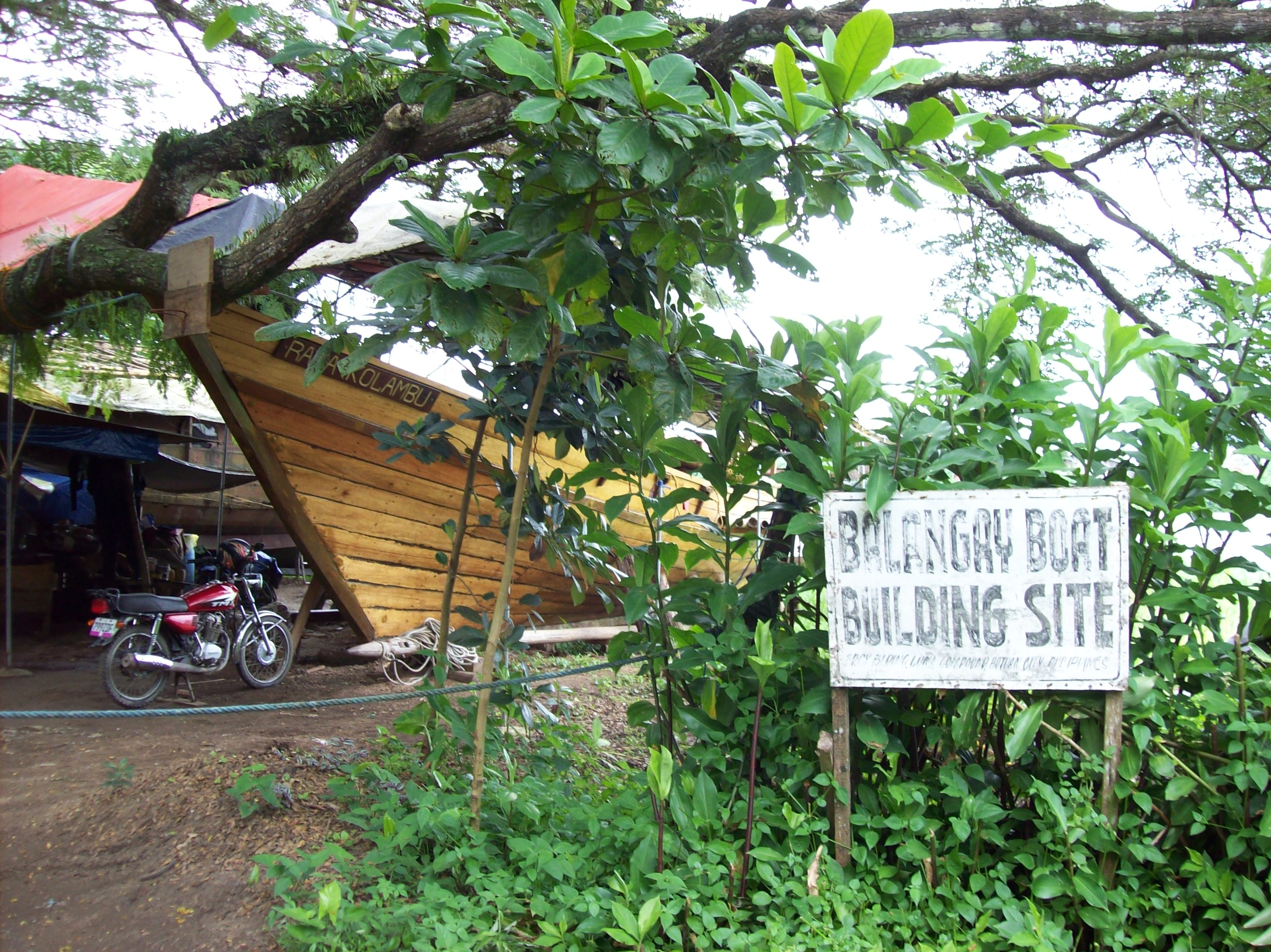
Balangay boat building site in Butuan

The second stage is known as os-os or us-us, which involves lashing the planks very tightly to wooden ribs (agar) with fiber or rattan ropes. The ropes are tied to holes bored diagonally into lugs (tambuko), which are rectangular or rounded protrusions on the inner surface of the planks. The tambuko occur at even distances corresponding to six dowel hole groupings. Wedges are then driven in the space between the ribs and the planks, drawing the lashings even tighter as the distance between them is increased. Thwarts are then placed across the hull which are also lashed to corresponding tambuko on each side and covered with removable decking. Once completed, the hull usually measures around 15 m (49 ft) long and 4 m (13 ft) wide.

The masts and outriggers (katig or kate) of the balangay boats were not preserved, which is why modern reconstructions tend to omit the latter. However, as with later balangay designs described by Spanish explorers, they are believed to possess large outriggers which would be necessary for them to carry sails without capsizing. Outriggers dramatically increased stability and sail power without significant increase in weight. Outriggers in large war balangay designs also supported paddling and fighting platforms known as the daramba and the burulan, respectively.

Similar traditional ship-building techniques are still preserved by Sama-Bajau boat makers in Sibutu Island in Tawi-Tawi.

== Butuan boats ==
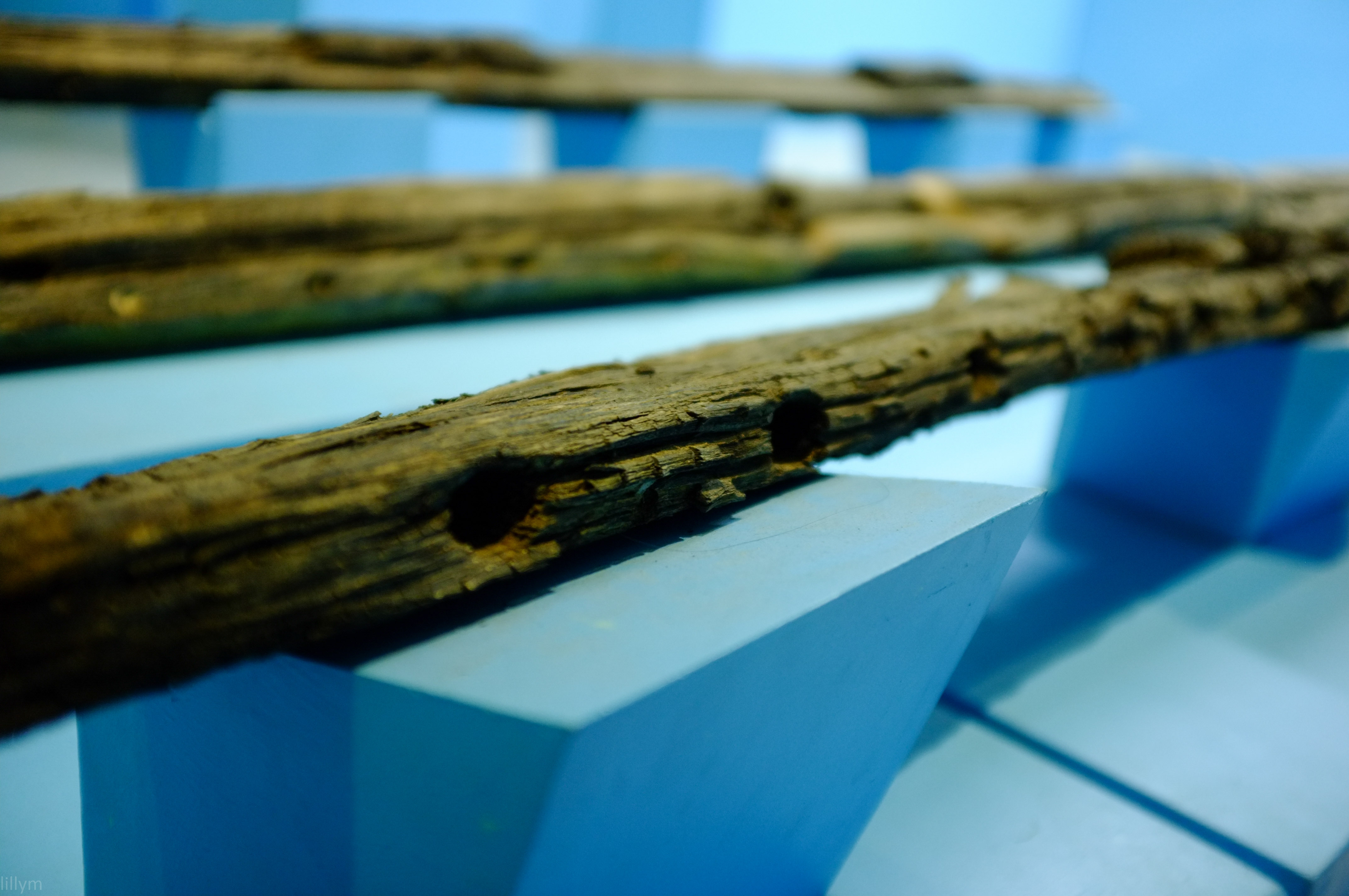
Planks from one of the Butuan boats in the Butuan National Museum showing protruding lugs and the holes on the edges where dowels were inserted

The Butuan balangay boats were the first wooden watercraft excavated in Southeast Asia. They were discovered in the late 1970s in Butuan, Agusan del Norte. A total of nine wooden boats were accidentally found by locals searching for alluvial gold on land near the Masao River. The site was in Sitio Ambangan, Barrio Libertad within an older dried-up river channel, perhaps a former tributary of the Masao River. The number of boats discovered in the site has since increased to at least eleven. Each boat is named based on the order that they were discovered, not when they were excavated.

Seven of the eleven balangays discovered (Butuan Boats 1, 2, 3, 4, 5, 7, and 9) have been excavated or are being excavated by the National Museum. Only three of which (Butuan Boats 1, 2, and 5) have been fully recovered and displayed. The wood used for the boats come from a variety of tree species, all of which are indigenous to the Philippines and neighboring regions in Southeast Asia. They were originally radiocarbon dated in the 1970s and 1980s, but the results (ranging from the 4th century CE to the 13th century CE) were too disparate for one site. More modern methods using accelerator mass spectrometry carbon-14 dating yielded more reliable results ranging from the 7th to 10th centuries CE.

- Butuan Boat 1 - excavated from 1976. It originally measured around 10.2 m (33 ft) in length and has been dated to 777-988 CE. The timber used in its construction are identified as Petersianthus quadrialatus (toog), and Vatica sp. (narig), and Shorea sp. (lawaan). It is currently exhibited at the National Museum of the Philippines (formerly the "Balangay Shrine") in Butuan.
- Butuan Boat 2 - excavated from 1977. It originally measured around 11.3 m (37 ft) in length. It is the oldest of the boats recovered and has been dated to 689-940 CE. The timber used in its construction are identified as Pterocarpus indicus (narra) and Hopea sp. (manggachapui). It is currently in storage at the National Museum of Anthropology in Manila, though it was formerly on display.
- Butuan Boat 3 - excavated from 1977. It was found close to Butuan Boat 2. Only three planks have been recovered from the ship, and the excavation was abandoned with no explanation.
- Butuan Boat 4 - started excavation in 2012, currently still being excavated. The original length is unknown, because roughly one half of the vessel remains unexcavated. It overlaps Butuan Boat 9 in the excavation site. It has been dated to around 775-973 CE. The timber used in its construction are identified as Vatica sp. (narig) and Pometia pinnata (malugai).
- Butuan Boat 5 - excavated from 1985-1986. It originally measured around 11.5 m (38 ft) in length. It has been dated to around 776-971 CE. The timber used in its construction are identified as Pistacia chinensis (sangilo), Vitex parviflora (mulawin), Dimocarpus sp. (alupag), and Pterocarpus indicus (narra). The quarter rudder was made from Eusideroxylon zwageri (tambulian). It is currently partially displayed at the National Museum in Butuan, along with Butuan Boat 1. Most of its parts are in storage. There were missteps in the early conservation of Butuan Boat 5, leading to the warping of some of the wood pieces.
- Butuan Boat 7 - excavated in 1988-1989. Very little information was recorded from its excavation, except for observations that it was in very poor condition and thus was not recovered.
- Butuan Boat 9 - started excavation in 2012, currently still being excavated. It is the largest discovered balangay and is sometimes referred to as the "mother boat", roughly measuring at twice the length of the other boats. It overlaps Butuan Boat 4 in the excavation site. It has been dated to around 773-968 CE. The timber used in its construction has not yet been identified.

The excavation of the Butuan Boats have faced major challenges. Having originally been discovered by treasure hunters, the early excavations of the site in the 1970s and 1980s suffered from poor written and photographic documentation and conservation measures. Excavation on Butuan Boats 5 and 9 have been suspended due to their poor conditions which necessitates further study on how to recover them without damage. As of 2022, the rest of the ships which are yet to be excavated, remain in their original waterlogged condition which is proven to be the best way to preserve the said artifacts.

The Butuan boats are the single largest concentration of lashed-lug boat remains of the Austronesian boatbuilding traditions. Similar shipwrecks found elsewhere in Southeast Asia include the Pontian boat (c. 260–430 CE) of Malaysia. The Butuan boats were found in association with large amounts of trade goods from China, Cambodia, Thailand (Haripunjaya and Satingpra), Vietnam, and as far as Persia, indicating they traded as far as the Middle East.

== Declarations ==
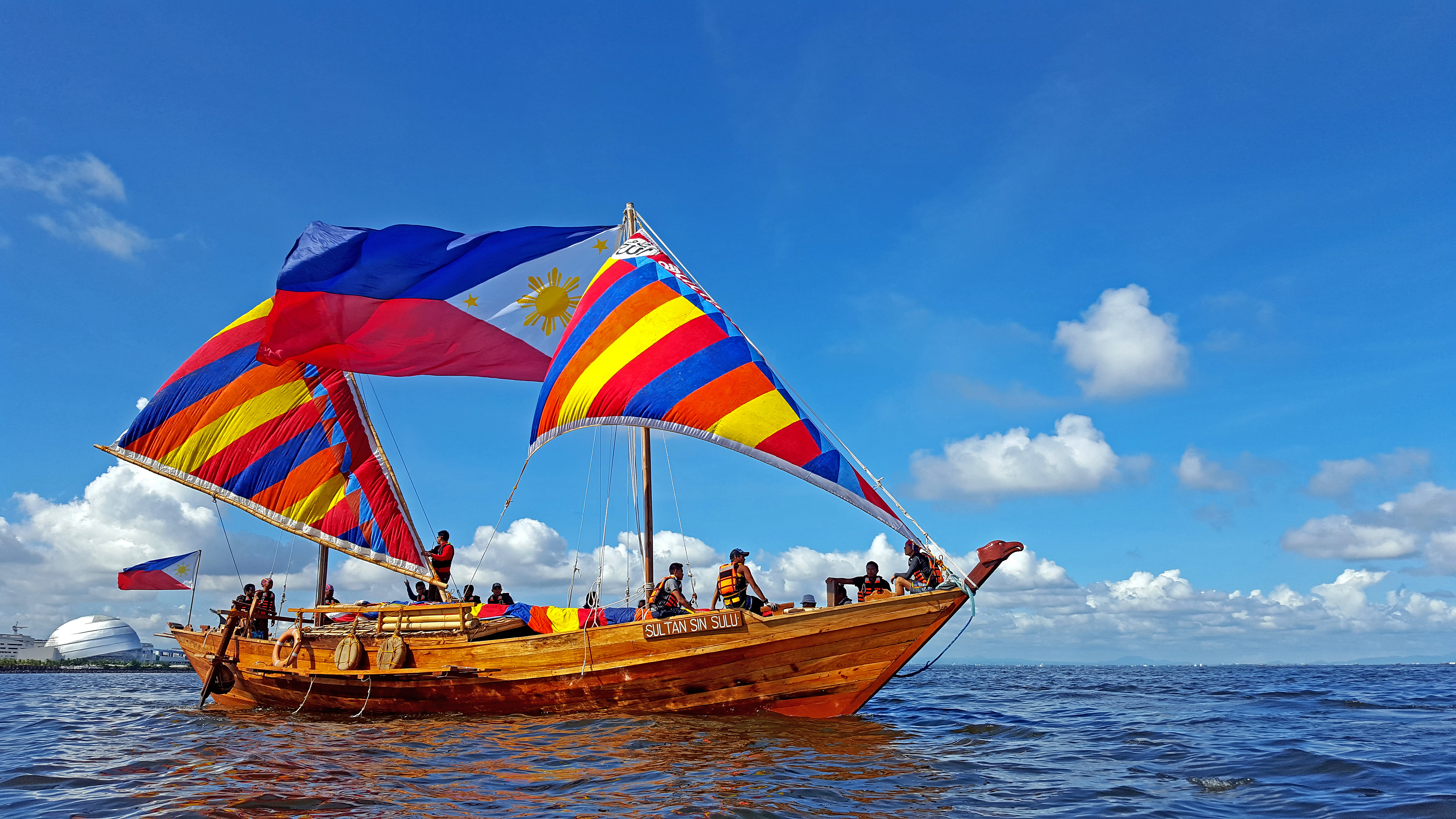
Balangays are among the many vessels present in Philippine mythology. The most famous vessels in mythology include Matan-ayon's sturdy Hulinday, Silungan Baltapa's expeditious ship, Agyu's flying Sarimbar, and Cacao's marketing psychopomp ship.

=== National Cultural Treasures ===
The balangays of Butuan was declared by President Corazon Aquino as National Cultural Treasures with Presidential Proclamation No. 86 on March 9, 1987, and the vicinity of excavation as archaeological reserves.

=== National Boat ===
In November 2015, the Balangay was declared as the National Boat of the Philippines by the House Committee on Revisions of Laws. The Balangay was chosen so that the "future generations of Filipinos will recognize the invaluable contribution of their forefathers in shaping the country's maritime tradition and in passing on the values of solidarity, harmony, determination, courage and bravery.

House Bill 6366 proposes that the Balangay should be the National Boat of the Philippines.

== The Balangay Voyage ==
In 2009, the Kaya ng Pinoy Inc. that conquered Mount Everest in 2006 announced plans to re-construct a balangay boat, with the help of Sama-Bajau (Sama Dilaya) and other tribal members who retained the lashed-lug boat-building techniques which were mostly lost in other islands. The balangay's voyage traced the routes of Filipino Ancestors during the waves of Austronesian settlement through Maritime Southeast Asia and the Pacific. The special wood for construction came from the established traditional source in southern Philippines, specifically Tawi-Tawi. The team have pinpointed Sama-Bajau master boat builders, whose predecessors actually built such boats, and used traditional tools during the construction. The balangay was constructed at Manila Bay, at the Cultural Center of the Philippines Complex.

The Balangays, named Diwata ng Lahi, Masawa Hong Butuan, and Sama Tawi-Tawi, navigated without the use of modern instruments, and only through the skills and traditional methods of the Filipino Sama people. They journeyed from Manila Bay to the southern tip of Sulu, stopping off at numerous Philippine cities along the way to promote the project. The journey around the country covered a distance of 2,108 nautical miles or 3,908 kilometers.

The second leg of the voyage (2010–2011) saw the balangay boats navigate around South East Asia – Brunei, Indonesia, Malaysia, Singapore, Cambodia, Thailand and up to the territorial waters of Vietnam before heading back to the Philippines.

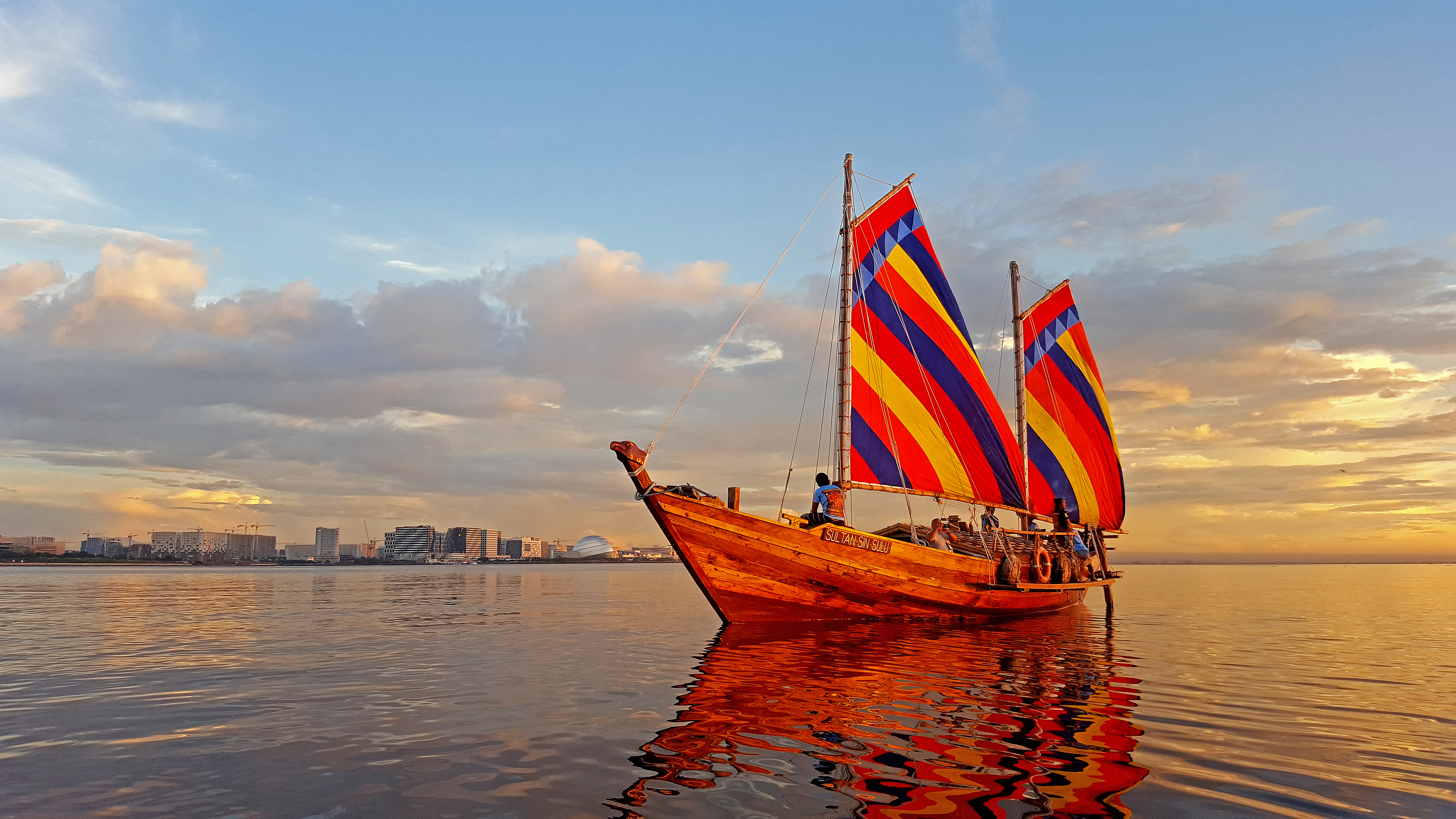
Balangay boat with gaff rigs in Manila Bay at sunset

The balangay was navigated by the old method used by the ancient mariners – steering by the Sun, the stars, the wind, cloud formations, wave patterns and bird migrations. Valdez and his team relied on the natural navigational instincts of the Badjao. Apart from the Badjao, Ivatan are also experts in using the boat. The organisers say that the voyage "aims to bring us back to the greatness of our ancestors and how colonialism robbed these away from us and produced the Filipino today".

In 2019, the Balangay Voyage team announced two more balangay (Lahi ng Maharlika and Sultan sin Sulu) will set sail on December 14, 2019, from Palawan to Butuan, then to Mactan to commemorate the 500th anniversary of the Battle of Mactan. The two boats will be temporarily renamed Raya Kolambu and Raya Siyagu.

=== Balangay Site Museum ===
The Balangay Site Museum also known as "Balanghai Shrine Museum" houses the balangays excavated on 320 AD. It is located at Sitio Ambangan, Barangay Libertad, Butuan. It also displays the cultural materials such as human and animal remains, hunting goods, jewelries, coffins, pots and other items associated to the boat. The shrine was built in 1979 after Felix A. Luna, a resident of the area, donated the land.

=== Balanghai Festival ===
In Butuan, Agusan del Norte, the annual Balanghai Festival celebrates the settlement of Butuan via the balangay ships.

== See also ==
- Avang
- Bangka (boat)
- Falua
- Garay (ship)
- Guilalo
- Karakoa
- Lancaran (ship)
- Lepa (ship)
- Paraw
- Vinta
