= Lashed-lug boat =

Boat construction method from Maritime Southeast Asia

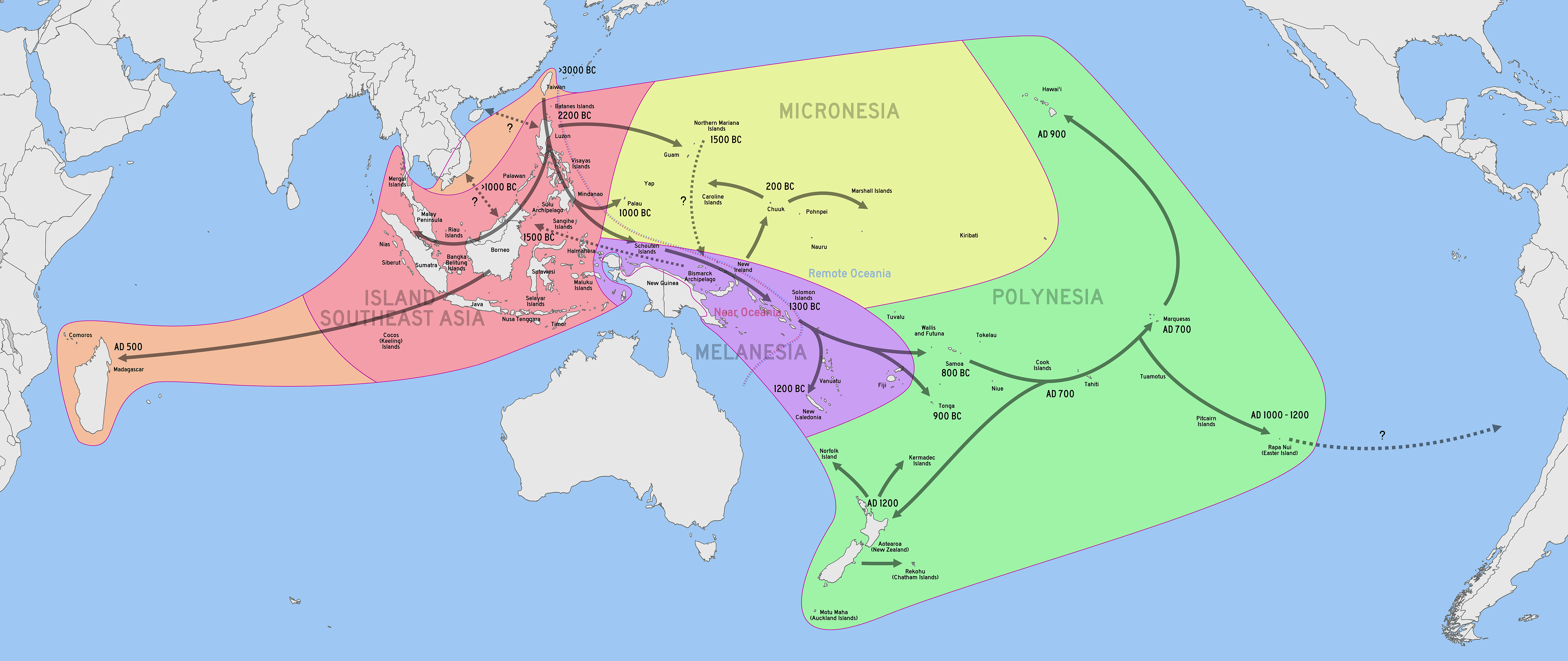
Map showing the migration and expansion of the Austronesians

Lashed-lug boats are ancient boat-building techniques of the Austronesian peoples. It is characterized by the use of raised lugs (also called "cleats") on the inner face of hull planks. These lugs have holes drilled in them so that other hull components such as ribs, thwarts or other structural components can be tied to them with natural fiber ropes (hence "lashed"). This allows a structure to be put together without any metal fastenings. The planks are further stitched together edge-to-edge by sewing or using dowels onto a dugout keel and the solid carved wood pieces that form the caps for the prow and stern. Characteristically, the shell of the boat is created first, prior to being lashed onto ribs. The seams between planks are also sealed with absorbent tapa bark and fiber that expands when wet or caulked with resin-based preparations.

This shipbuilding tradition is considered to be an example of parallel evolution, as it is found in Scandinavian boats covering a period from 400 BCE to the 9th century AD. There, the term "cleat" is applied to the blocks carved out of the hull planks, and essentially the same role is performed as with the "lugs" in lashed lug construction. In the Scandinavian archaeological examples, planks may be sewn together, held with iron fastenings or with treenails. The two regional uses of this method are considered cases of independent invention of one of a limited number of solutions to the same boat-building problem.

Lashed-lug construction has been used on a wide size range of vessels, from small craft, such as logboats that have had planks added to their sides to increase their freeboard, to large plank-built ships. It is found in traditional boats of Maritime Southeast Asia, Melanesia, Madagascar, Micronesia, and Polynesia. It forms part of the maritime technology associated with Austronesian peoples in their spread throughout the islands of the Indo-Pacific. The oldest recovered remains of ships of lashed-lug construction is the Pontian boat of Malaysia dated to at around c.260–430 CE.

== Basic construction ==
The lashed-lug technique remains remarkably homogeneous throughout the entirety of the Austronesian range. The keel and the base of the hull is a simple dugout canoe. Planks are then added gradually to the keel, either by sewing fiber ropes through drilled holes or through the use of internal dowels on the plank edges. Unlike carvel construction and in common with many early boat building methods, the shell of the boat is created first, prior to being fastened to the ribs. The seams between planks are also sealed with absorbent tapa bark and fiber that expands when wet or caulked with resin-based preparations.

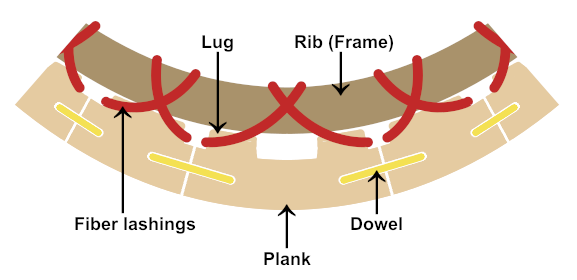
Generalized diagram (cross-section) of lashed-lug planking in Butuan Boat Two (Clark et al., 1993)

The most distinctive aspect of lashed-lug boats are the lugs (also called "cleats" by some authors). These are a series of carved protrusions with holes bored into them on the inside surfaces of the planks which are then lashed tightly together with the lugs on the adjacent planks and to ribs using plaited fiber (usually rattan, coir, and other palm fibers).

The seams of the planks were commonly caulked with resin-based pastes made from various plants as well as tapa bark and fibers which would expand when wet, further tightening joints and making the hull watertight. The ends of the boat are capped with single pieces of carved Y-shaped wooden blocks or posts which are attached to the planks in the same way.

Once the shell of the boat is completed, the ribs are then built and lashed to the lugs to further strengthen the structure of the ship, while still retaining the inherent flexibility of the outer hull. The outriggers, when present, are attached with similar lashings to the main hull.

The smallest Austronesian boat (excluding rafts and dugout canoes) characteristically have five parts all put together using the lashed-lug technique. These consist of the dugout keel, two planks that form the strakes, and the end caps for the prow and the stern. Larger ships usually differed in the number of planks used for the strakes, but the construction techniques remain the same.

In older arrangements, the lashed lug construction is accompanied by the stitching together of the edges of the hull planks. This is done in a characteristic way which contrasts with the edge-stitching of planks in, for instance, traditional Indian Ocean craft. Lashed lug construction has a sequence of individually tied stitches which pass through L-shaped holes cut from the plank edge to the inner face of the plank. The result is that none of the stitch is exposed on the outside of the hull and so is protected from abrasion. The edge-to-edge fastening of the planks was supplemented by some dowels which joined the planks together – the dowels are thought to aid positioning during constructions and to resist shearing forces on the lashings while the boat is in use. In archaeological remains that date from the beginning of the second millennium CE, the number of dowels used to join hull planking increased and stitching ceased to be used. Consequently the terminology that was agreed upon for these construction techniques are "stitched-plank and lashed-lug" for the older method and "lashed-lug" alone for the later one.

== Archaeology ==
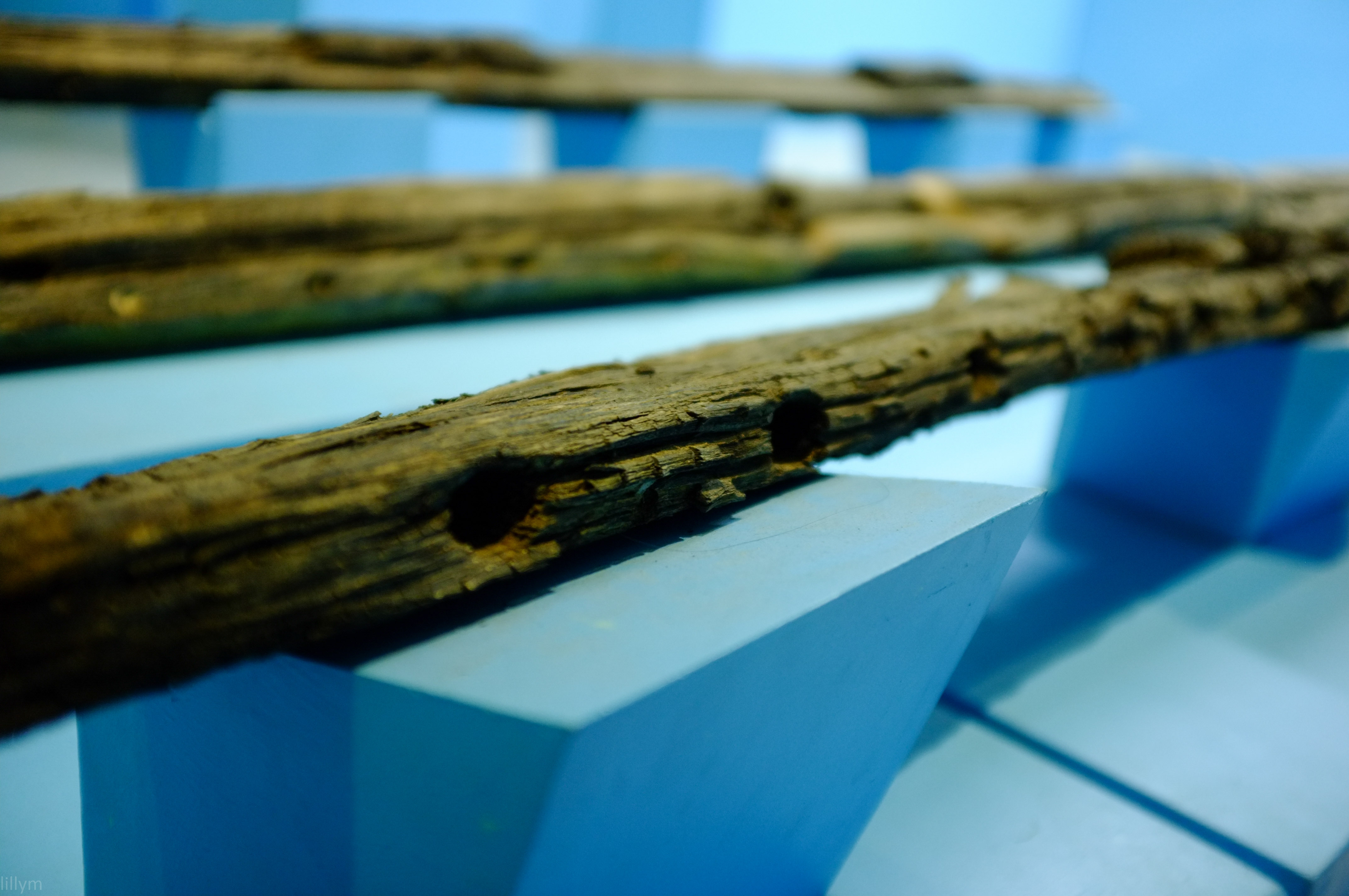
Planks from one of the balangay burial boats (c.320–1250 CE) in the Butuan National Museum in the Philippines showing protruding lugs and the holes on the edges where dowels were inserted

Lashed-lug techniques are different enough from the shipbuilding methods of South Asia, the Middle East, and China to identify remains of ships found in this region as being Austronesian. Despite this, some lashed-lug Austronesian shipwrecks have been misidentified as Indian or Chinese due to their cargo in the past. Non-Austronesian ships also later adopted lashed-lug techniques from contact with Austronesian traders, the most notable example being the Belitung shipwreck (c.830 CE).

The oldest recovered lashed-lug ships include the Pontian boat of Pahang, Malaysia (c. 260–430 CE); the Punjulharjo boat (c. 660-780 CE) of Rembang, Indonesia; and the balangay boat burials of Butuan, Philippines (at least eleven ships ranging from c. 689 to 988 CE). The partial remains of the even earlier Pak Klong Kluay shipwreck (c. 2nd century CE) of Thailand also features lugs, although its planks are uniquely joined using pegged mortise and tenon joints, instead of dowels or sewing. All of these ships are Austronesian. Archaeological evidence of lashed-lug ships from 1500 BCE to 1300 CE remains negligible due to the perishable nature of wooden vessels in the tropics. The Butuan boat burials (which total to eleven) are the single largest concentration of lashed-lug boat remains of the Austronesian boatbuilding traditions. The Butuan boats were found in association with large amounts of trade goods from China, Cambodia, Thailand (Haripunjaya and Satingpra), Vietnam, and as far as Persia, indicating they traded as far as the Middle East.

The oldest evidence of the lashed-lug techniques, however, are found on boat-shaped log coffins recovered from Kuala Selinsing in Perak, Malaysia, dated to around the 1st to 2nd centuries CE. Such coffins and other watercraft symbolism are widespread among Austronesian groups throughout Southeast Asia, even among groups with no maritime access, underpinning the ancestral importance of the sea in Austronesian cultures.

== Comparison with other traditions ==
Though the sewn boat technique (but not the lashed lugs) is also used for boats in the western Indian Ocean traditions, it differs in that the stitching in Austronesian boats are discontinuous and only visible from the inside of the hull. This indicates that the sewn boat techniques of the Indian Ocean and Austronesia are not culturally-linked and developed independent of each other. The planks of ancient Austronesian ships were originally joined together using only the sewn boat technique. However, the development of metallurgy in Maritime Southeast Asia in the last two thousand years resulted in the replacement of the sewing technique with internal dowels, as well as increasing use of metal nails.

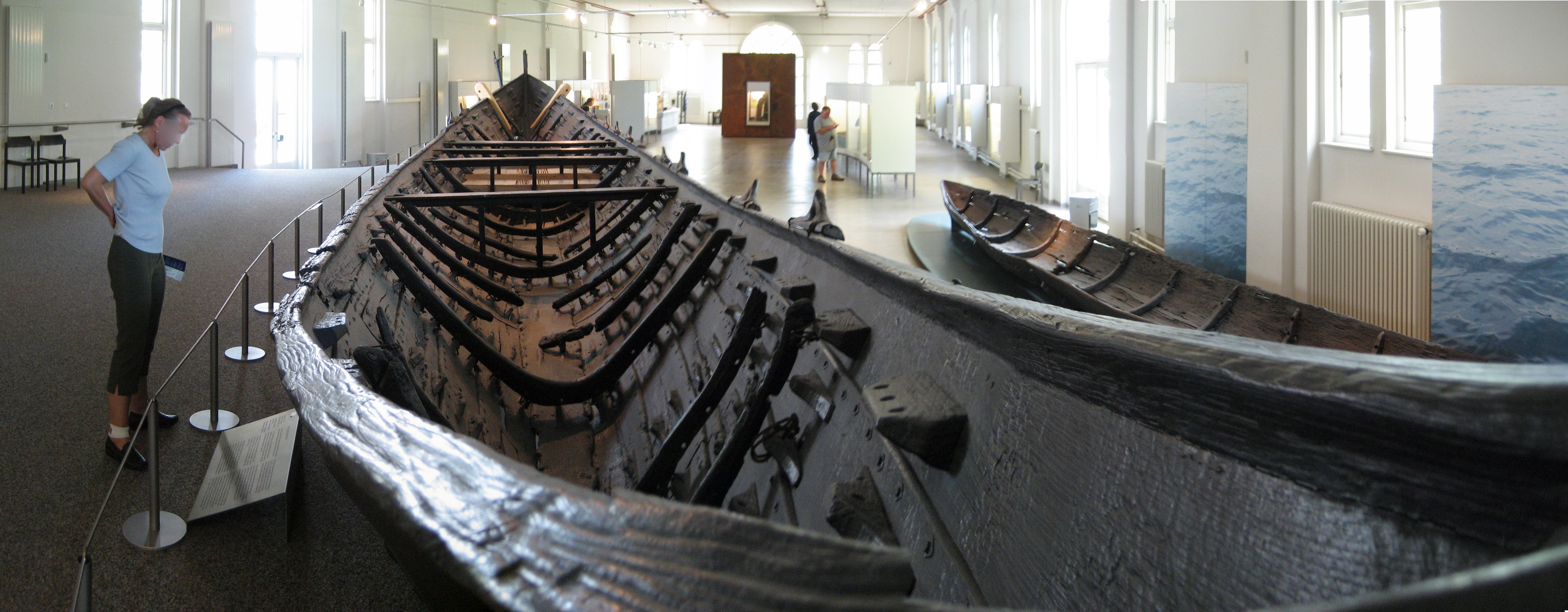
Nydam boat (Denmark), showing frames which are lashed to cleats (lugs) on the hull planking

Sewn boats occurred in the Mediterranean from the Bronze Age into the medieval period.

Early Scandinavian boats used lashings through cleats (lugs) on the hull planks to attach to the ribs of the boat. An example of this tradition is the Nydam boat, dated to 310-320 CE. This particular boat combined metal fastenings of planks, sewn planks and lashed cleats/lugs connecting to ribs. An earlier example (400-300 BCE), the Hjortspring boat is based on a dugout log which is expanded with sewn clinker planks with integral cleats/lugs lashed to framing. The Gokstad ship also used the lashing of ribs to cleats in the lower parts of the hull, and treenails elsewhere. Lashed lug also has a general similarity to the Bronze Age Ferriby boats in England.

== See also ==
- Austronesian vessels
- Outrigger boat
- Crab-claw sail
- Tanja sail
- Balangay
- Sewn boat
- Mtepe
- Hjortspring boat
