= Sewn boat =

Type of wooden boat

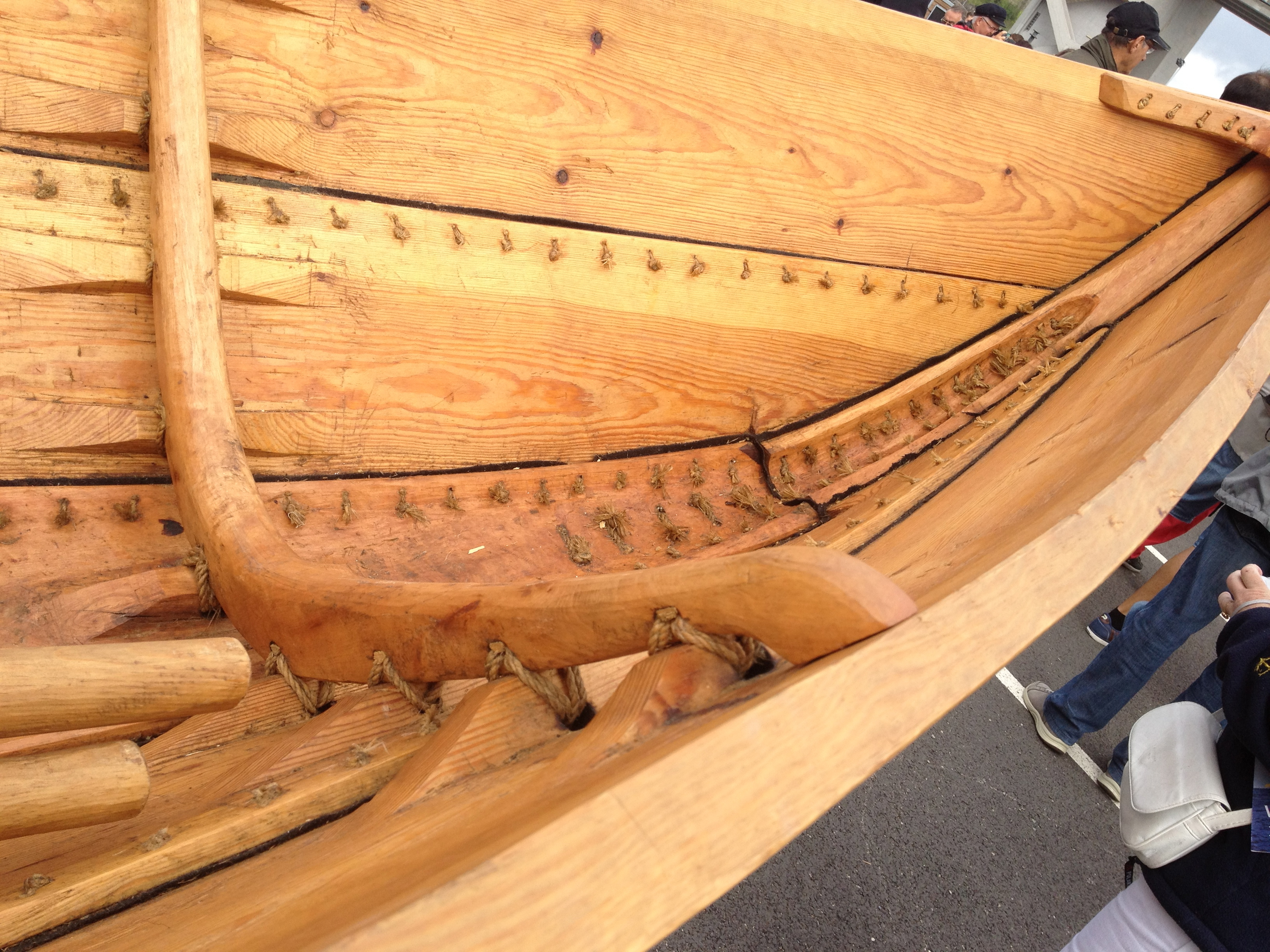
Halsnøy boat, detail of the bow.

A sewn boat is a type of wooden boat which has its planks sewn, stitched, tied, or bound together with natural fibre rope (e.g., coir in the Indian Ocean) tendons or flexible wood, such as roots and willow branches. Sewn boat construction techniques were used in many parts of the world prior to the development of metal fasteners, and continued to be used long after that time for small boats to reduce construction costs where metal fasteners were too expensive.

== Name and similar techniques ==
Although well established, the sewn boat name is somewhat misleading since it suggests textile or leather skin construction, as often found in kayaks. Some have proposed to use laced boats instead. A modern plywood construction method that resembles sewn boats is the stitch and glue method; in this technique plywood panels are stitched together, often with wire, and the seams are reinforced with fiberglass composite; the stitching may then be removed or may remain in place. Also related is the treenailed boat.

Lashed-lug construction is used in the distinctive maritime technology of Austronesian peoples.

== Construction ==
Sewn boats start with the construction of the hull, or outside "shell" of the boat, rather than the frame, resulting in a monocoque type of structure. Carefully shaped planks are connected at the edges. The planks may overlap, as in the Hjortspring boat, or join flush at their edges, as is found in Arab dhows and along the coast of India. As the planks are placed together, the hull begins to bend into the desired shape. Internal framing may be added to the planks after they are sewn in, providing additional rigidity.

While wooden pegs (often called treenails) can be used to fasten thicker clinker planks, this technique only works if the planks are thick enough to hold the pegs. Because of this, large ships were often built using pegs, while smaller boats would use sewn planks.

The replica of the Belitung shipwreck, Jewel of Muscat, was built mostly by Indian shipwrights with extensive experience of sewn planking construction. The coir ropes used to sew the planks together were tightened to very close to their breaking strain. (This is in contrast to the much lower sewing tensions proposed in an earlier theoretical model. (Note: This model is Coates, J.F., 1985, Some Structural Models for Sewn Boats, in S.McGrail and E.Kentley (eds), Sewn Plank Boats: Archaeological and Ethnographic Papers Based on those Presented to a Conference at Greenwich in November, 1984, 9–18. Greenwich: NMM Archaeological Series 10; Oxford: BAR Int. Series 276., quoted in Burningham)) The multiple stitches at each pair of holes and the relatively close spacing of those holes mean that there is a substantial clamping force holding the edges of the planks together. (Note: Natural fibre ropes, including coir, increase their tensile strength when wound tightly around a solid object; this effect is a result of the fibres pushing together. This means that the stitches have higher tensile strength once in situ.) This has shown to have good structural properties and the designer argues that this is superior to a similar vessel with metal fastenings, where those fastenings concentrate forces whilst sewing distributes them across the hull structure.

== History ==
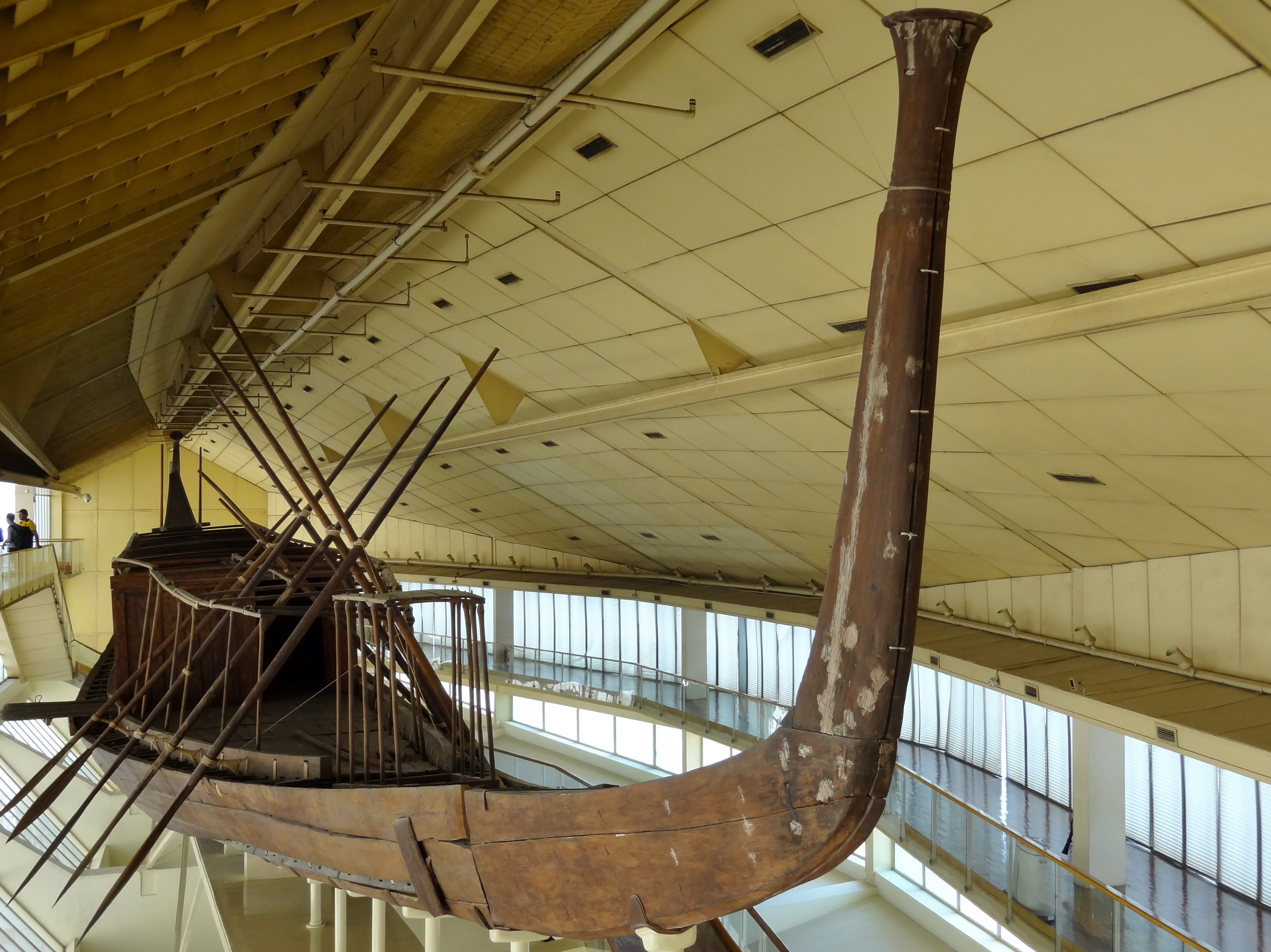
The reconstructed "solar barque" of Khufu, Egypt, c. 2500 BC

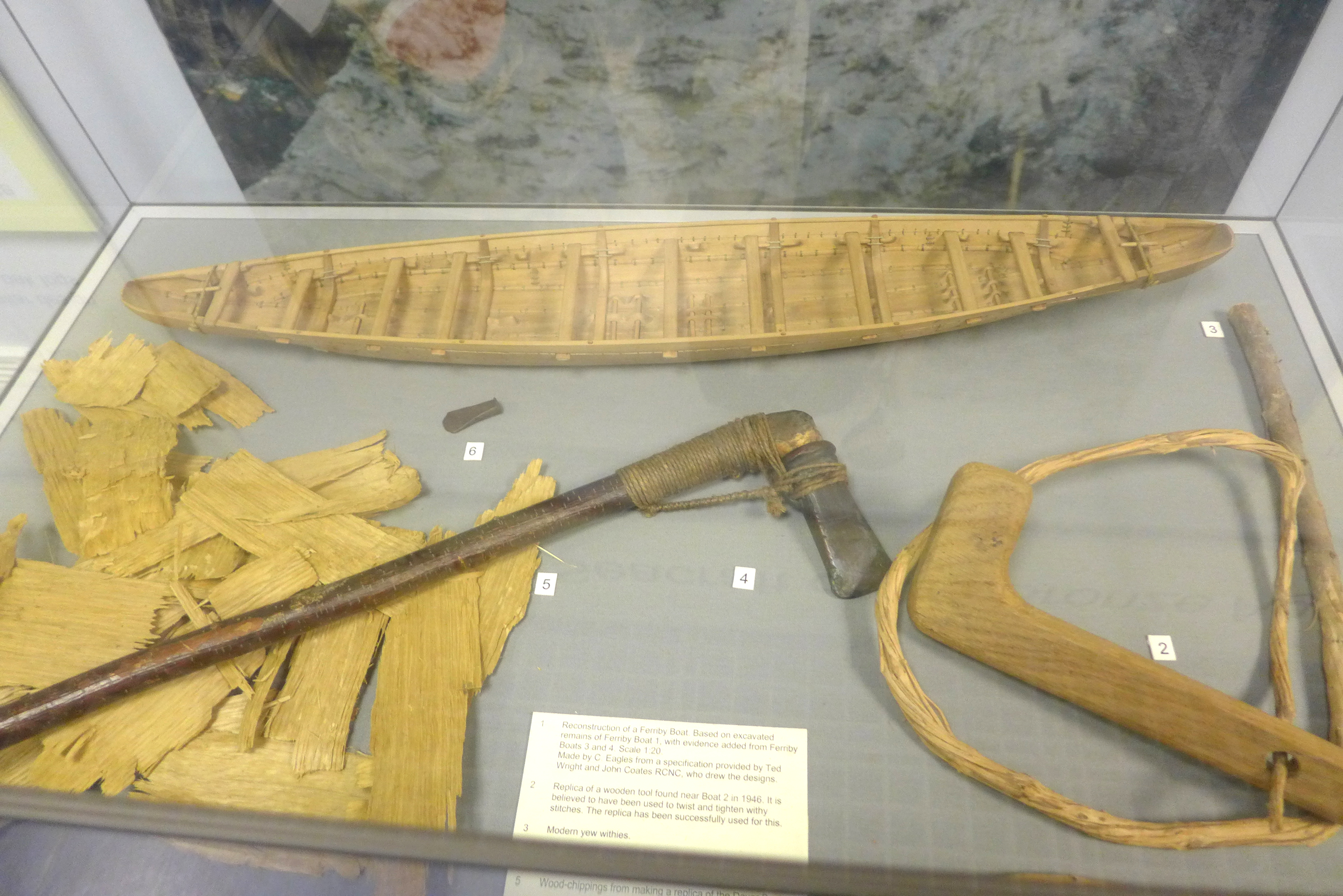
Ferriby boat model and replica tools, Britain, c. 2000 BC

The earliest surviving examples of plank-built boats are the Abydos boats, the earliest of which is dated to c. 3050 BC. These are sewn boats. The investigated example, BG10, had an unusual sewing technique, with the continuous fibrous strap running at right angles to the long direction of the planks. Therefore each length of strap went through all the planks on that side of the vessel. In contrast, other sewn boats that use continuous sewing (as opposed to a series of individual stitches) have the thread go along the seam between two planks.

A well-known early example of a sewn boat is the 43.4-metre-long (142 ft) long "solar barque" or funerary boat on show near the Gizeh pyramid in Egypt; it dates back from c. 2500 BC. The sewn construction was a natural step when coming from raft or reed boatbuilding, which dates from some thousands of years before that. The oldest sea-going vessel was the Zambratija boat in Croatia, c. 1200 BC. In other parts of the world, the oldest sewn craft comes from North Ferriby, where one sample (called F3) mass-spectrometry dates to 2030 BC. Later finds include some early Greek ships. The oldest Nordic find is the Hjortspring boat in Denmark (c 300 BC). In Finland, Russia, Karelia and Estonia small sewn boats have been constructed more recently; until the 1920s in poor areas of Russia.

Sewn construction is used in the various forms of the Austronesian "proas" of the Indo-Pacific (which also used the lashed-lug techniques) and the Middle Eastern and South Asian dhow native to the Red Sea, Persian Gulf, and Indian Ocean. Despite their proximity and similarity, they differ markedly from each other, indicating that they developed independently. Austronesian boat-sewing techniques are discontinuous and are only visible from the inside surfaces of the hull, while South Asian and Middle Eastern boat-sewing techniques are visible in both the exterior and interior of the hull and are continuous.

== Comparison with other traditions ==
Though the sewn boat technique (but not the lashed lugs) is also used for boats in the western Indian Ocean traditions, it differs in that the stitching in Austronesian boats are discontinuous and only visible from the inside of the hull. This indicates that the sewn boat techniques of the Indian Ocean and Austronesia are not culturally-linked and developed independent of each other. The planks of ancient Austronesian ships were originally joined together using only the sewn boat technique. However, the development of metallurgy in Maritime Southeast Asia in the last two thousand years resulted in the replacement of the sewing technique with internal dowels, as well as increasing use of metal nails.

== Examples of sewn boats ==
- Dhow
- INSV Kaundinya
- Jewel of Muscat
- Hjortspring boat
- Mtepe
- Nordland
- Itaomacip
- Dover Bronze Age boat
- Abydos boats
- Mirror dinghy, a 1960s self-build sailing dinghy design, based on plywood panels sewn together with copper wire, then strengthened with adhesive.

== See also ==
- Lashed-lug boat
- Bell Beaker culture
