= Belitung shipwreck =

Archaeological discovery

Coordinates: 02°45′00″S 107°36′36″E

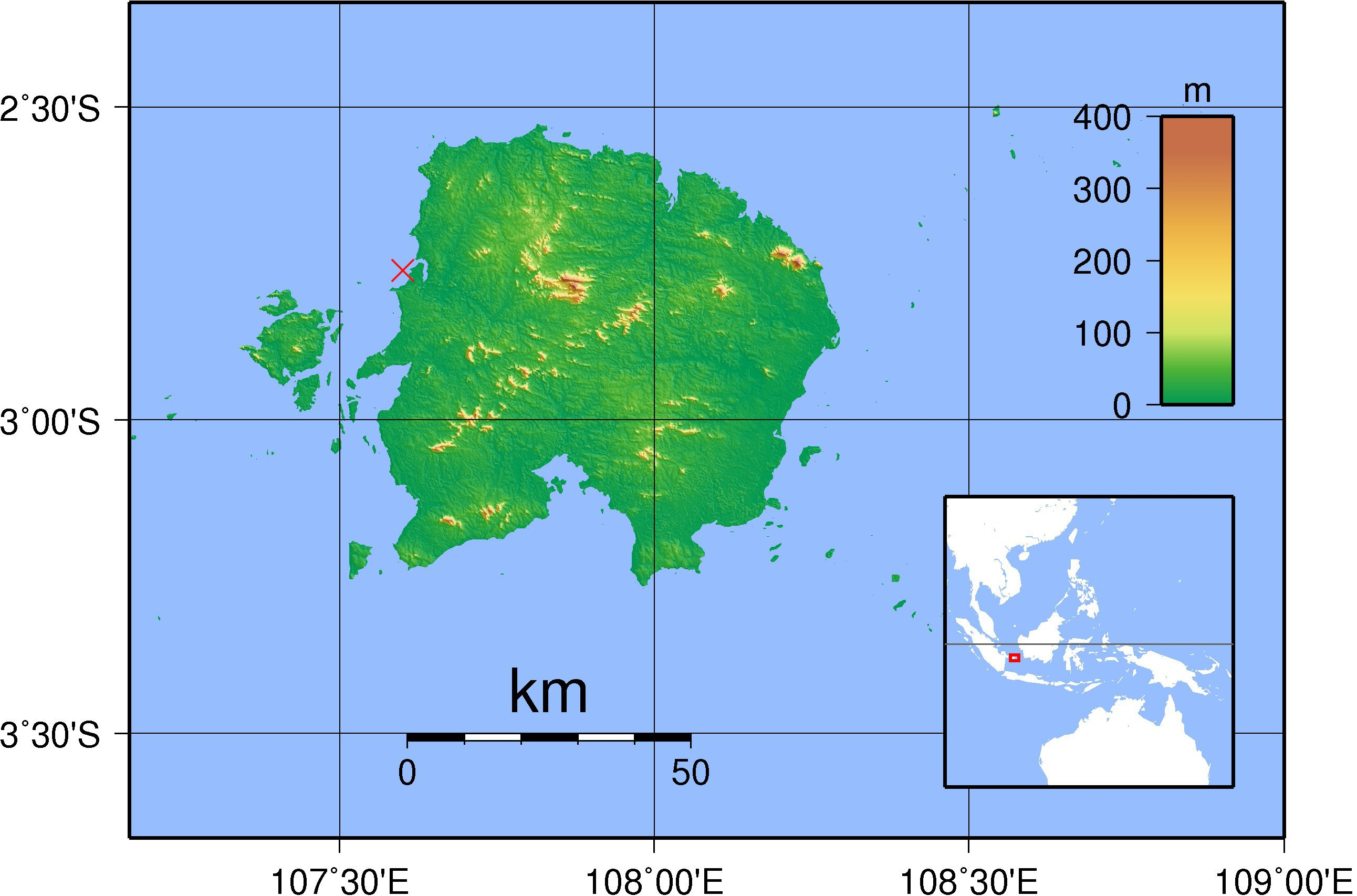
Map of Belitung Island showing the Belitung shipwreck marked with a red cross (2°45′00"S, 107°35′36"E)

The Belitung shipwreck (also called the Tang shipwreck or Batu Hitam shipwreck) is the wreck of an Arabian dhow that sank around 830 AD. The ship completed its outward journey from Arabia to China but sank on the return voyage from China, approximately 1.6 kilometres (1 mi) off the coast of Belitung Island, Indonesia. The reason the ship was south of the typical trade route when it sank remains unknown. Belitung lies southeast of the Singapore Strait, approximately 610 kilometres (380 mi) away, a secondary route that was more common for ships traveling between China and the Java Sea, which is south of Belitung Island.

The wreck has provided archaeologists with two major discoveries: the largest single collection of Tang dynasty artefacts found outside China, known as the "Tang Treasure", and the Arabian dhow itself, which offers new insights into the trade routes between China and the Middle East during that period. The treasure has been preserved as one collection, and efforts during excavation to maintain the integrity of the site and its cargo have produced detailed archaeological evidence. This evidence has provided new knowledge of the shipbuilding techniques of the time, as well as insights into the nature and style of the traded artefacts, shedding light on the trade between these two regions.

Currently, the Tang dynasty treasures recovered from the Belitung shipwreck are on permanent display at the Asian Civilisations Museum in Singapore under the name "Tang Shipwreck".

== Discovery and route ==
Map of the Middle East and Asia showing the expected route of the ship in red, with a green box highlighting Belitung Island and Oman colored in blue (click to enlarge)

=== Discovery ===
The wreck was discovered by local fishermen in 1998 in the Gelasa Strait, at a depth of 17 metres (56 ft). The rights to the site were purchased from local fishermen, and a license for excavation was awarded to a local Indonesian company. (Note: The name of the Indonesian company has not been widely mentioned in media or official sources. The most detailed information available is from the Smithsonian Ethics Briefing guide, published in 2011, regarding discussions on the cancellation of the exhibition at the Sackler Gallery.) Tilman Walterfang and his team at Seabed Explorations subsequently financed and conducted the excavation under a cooperative agreement with the original salvage company, at the request of the Indonesian government, which provided security for the site through the Indonesian Navy. The excavation took place over two expeditions, beginning in August 1998 and continuing with a second phase in 1999. Seabed Explorations supplied vessels and funded naval operations to secure the wreck site before and during the monsoon season.

=== Route ===
It is unknown why the ship was so far from its expected route (shown in red on the map to the right), as most ships departing China for Arabia would have traveled through the South China Sea. Typically, they would then turn northwest after passing southern Vietnam, continuing through the Singapore Strait into the Straits of Malacca between Peninsular Malaysia and Sumatra. Belitung lies some distance from this usual route, making the ship's presence in this area puzzling. The island is southeast of the Singapore Strait by approximately 610 kilometres (380 mi), and this secondary route is generally more common for ships traveling from the Java Sea, located south of Belitung Island, to the Strait of Malacca, which lies around 610 kilometres (380 mi) north of the island.

== Ship and construction ==
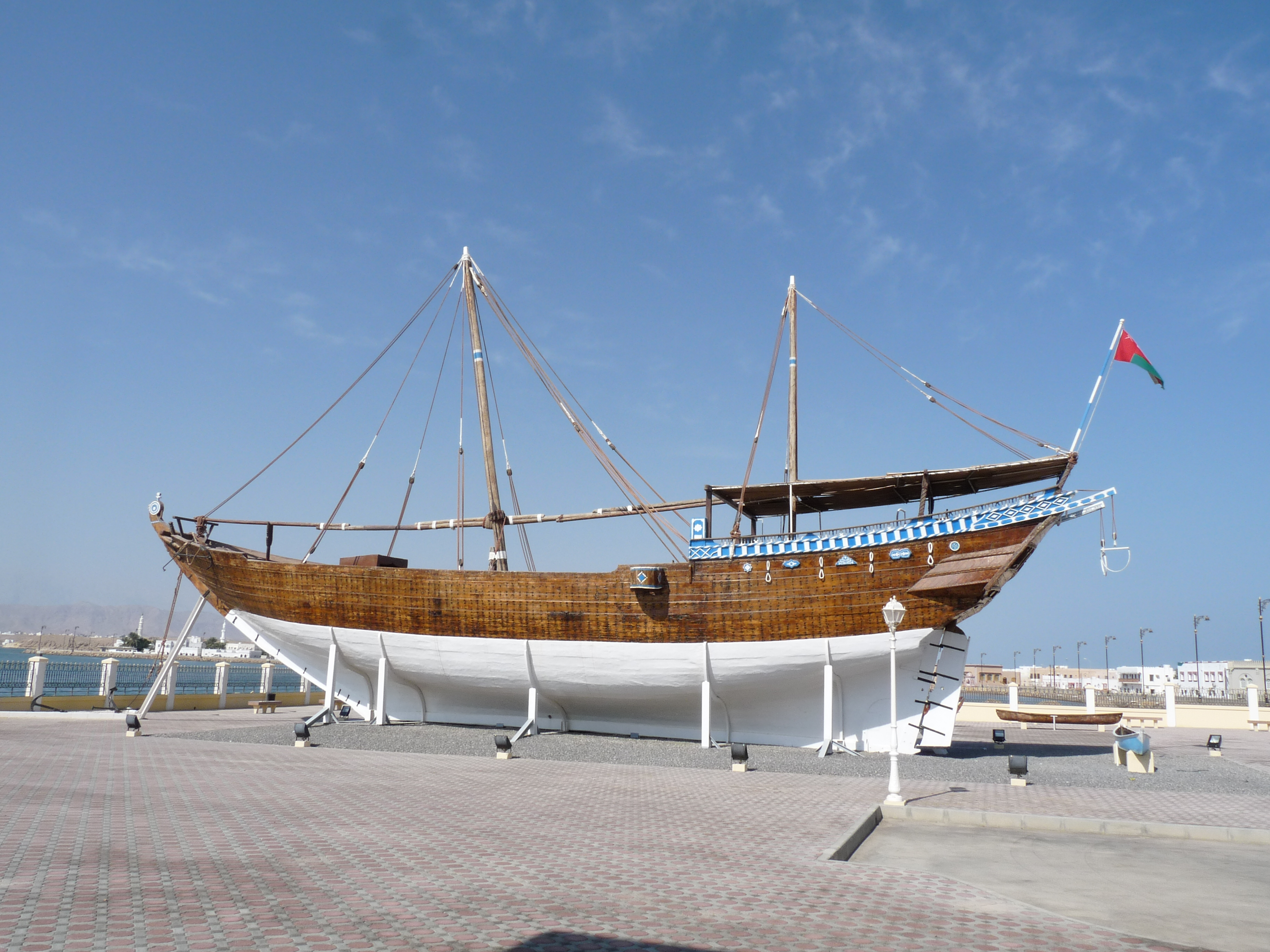
The shipwreck is of a dhow similar in size and construction to this one, in Oman.

The shipwrecked dhow was approximately 6.4 metres (21 ft) wide and 18 metres (58 ft) long and is notable for two reasons: it is the first ancient Arabian ship to be found and excavated, and its planks were sewn together using a thin rope made of coconut fibers, rather than the traditional pegs or nails used in Arabia in later centuries.

The wreck timbers were buried under sediment that preserved the wooden remains, preventing them from being consumed by marine worms. Shipwrecks of this age are rare finds, and this particular one was in such good condition that much of the hull was preserved. This has provided valuable insights into the construction techniques of ships from this period—an unprecedented discovery, as no other Arabian ship of this type has been found with its cargo intact.

Sections of the original timbers were well-preserved enough for scientists to analyze them and identify some of the wood types used. It is possible that the ship was built in western Asia and later purchased by Arabian merchants for use on the Oman-to-China route; the cargo includes numerous artefacts with Arabian influences.

=== Construction techniques ===
The ship was constructed around a 15.3 metres (50 ft) long keel with a thickness of 14–15 centimetres (5.5–5.9 in), which is believed to have survived intact. The front of the ship featured a 61° angle of rake at the bow, where the stem post was joined to the keel using mortise and tenon joints, secured by a 16 millimetres (0.63 in) diameter rope. The hull planks were stitched to the frames and keel through holes spaced 5–6 centimetres (2.0–2.4 in) apart. Additionally, the boat included a keelson for added strength, resting on the half-frames.

Excavation archaeologist Michael Flecker compared the wreck's construction to contemporaneous vessel types and found the closest parallels in the lashed-lug boats of the Austronesian peoples in Maritime Southeast Asia, such as the Pontian boat from Pahang, Malaysia (c. 260–430 CE), and the balangay boat burials from Butuan, Philippines (c. 320–1250 CE). However, Flecker noted that even these similarities were limited, as lashed-lug construction typically involved edge-joined planks with dowels and lashed protruding lugs, whereas the Belitung wreck featured fully through-stitched planks without dowels. He ultimately concluded that the wreck was an Arabian (or possibly Indian) vessel based on hull form, stitching technique, timber species, and other features. Flecker noted that fully stitched boats were known from regions as far apart as the African coast, Oman, the Red Sea, the Indian coast, and the Maldives.

Roman sources, such as the 6th-century historian Procopius, also reference similar boats with planks stitched together, used in the "Indian Seas". Although no Arabian ships of this type had been previously discovered, references to them exist in historical texts, including the late-Tang Ling biao lu yi ("Strange Things Noted in the South"). According to John Guy, a curator at the Metropolitan Museum of Art, this text "describes the ships of foreign merchants as being stitched together with the fiber of coir-palms and having their seams caulked rather than using iron nails to secure their planks." This method is distinct from the metal fastenings seen in later shipbuilding practices.

=== Wood types ===
Samples of wood from the shipwreck were sent for analysis at the Forest and Forest Products division of the Commonwealth Scientific and Industrial Research Organisation (CSIRO) in Australia. The analysis was conducted by Jugo Ilic, a senior wood anatomist at CSIRO. Many of the samples were too deteriorated for positive identification, as the lack of remaining cellulose in the wood cells prevented successful analysis.

Several types of wood were identified: teak (Tectona grandis) was used for the through-beams, as it is resilient to the teredo worm (family Teredinidae). The ceiling was made from a Cupressus species, possibly Cupressus torulosa; the stem post was constructed from rosewood of the family Leguminosae (now called Fabaceae) and either the genus Dalbergia or Pterocarpus. Additionally, a wooden box found in the stern area was made from the genus Artocarpus of the mulberry family, Moraceae.

The species used for the hull planks was not positively identified but is thought to be Amoora from the family Meliaceae. The timber for the frames was similarly undetermined, though one frame was probably from Amoora or from the genus Afzelia of the family Fabaceae. Afzelia is notable because its three main species—A. africana, A. bipindensis, and A. pachyloba—are primarily found in a small part of Africa, stretching from the mid-western coast in a narrow band toward the east coast but stopping a few hundred miles short of it.

Based on construction techniques and materials, it was initially speculated that the ship could be of either Arabian or Indian origin, as there was little distinction between ships from these regions during that period. However, the frame's use of a wood species found only in a limited part of Africa adds complexity to this identification. After analyzing the hull form, timber species, and construction methods, Ilic concluded that the wreck was likely of Indian or Arabian origin, with India being the more probable site of construction, though Arabian origins were not ruled out due to the importation of timber for shipbuilding in the Middle East. Flecker later concluded that the wreck was an Arabian ship, asserting in his 2010 chapter in the Sackler exhibition catalogue that "from an analysis of construction methods and materials and hull form, the author has determined that the Belitung wreck is an Arab vessel."

=== Legacy ===
Current knowledge of the original materials and methods used in constructing this particular Arab dhow largely originates from the shipwreck itself. The Jewel of Muscat reconstruction—a replica built as an exact copy of the wreck—demonstrated that the ship resembles a baitl qarib, a type of vessel still found in Oman today. Within the hull of the shipwreck, large lumps of concretion contained artefacts from the ship's cargo, dating back to the Tang dynasty of China, around 800 AD. This connection has led to the wreck being referred to as the "Tang shipwreck" or "Tang treasure ship".

The ship's timbers and artefacts were publicly displayed for the first time in 2011. The world debut exhibition, showcasing both the artefacts and timbers from the ship, took place at the ArtScience Museum, adjacent to Singapore's Marina Bay Sands. The historical significance of the shipwreck's discovery led to the decision to construct the Jewel of Muscat as a faithful reconstruction of the original dhow.

== Cargo ==
The wreck contained three main types of Chinese wares in the form of bowls: Changsha ware (produced in kilns in Tongguan), which made up the majority of the 60,000 items and was originally packed in either straw cylinders or "Dusun" storage jars; white ware, manufactured in the Ding kilns, which included the earliest known intact underglaze blue and white dishes; and Yue ware from Zhejiang Province. One Changsha bowl bore an inscription with a date: "16th day of the seventh month of the second year of the Baoli reign," or 826 AD, a date later confirmed by radiocarbon dating of star anise found among the wreckage. The cargo showed a variety of influences and markets, featuring designs such as Buddhist lotus symbols, motifs from Central Asia and Persia, Koranic inscriptions, and green-splashed bowls popular in Iran.

The cargo also included a variety of items, such as spice jars (martaban), ewers, inkwells, funeral urns, and gilt-silver boxes. According to John Guy of the Metropolitan Museum of Art in New York, the cargo represented "the richest and largest consignment of early ninth-century southern Chinese gold and ceramics ever discovered in a single hoard." The cargo also included spices, resin, and metal ingots used as ballast. Notable items found include a large gold cup—the largest Tang dynasty gold cup ever found—and a silver flask decorated with a pair of ducks. The gold cup features images of people engaged in various activities, such as musicians and a Persian dancer. The thumb plate on its handle displays two men with non-Chinese features, depicted with curly hair.

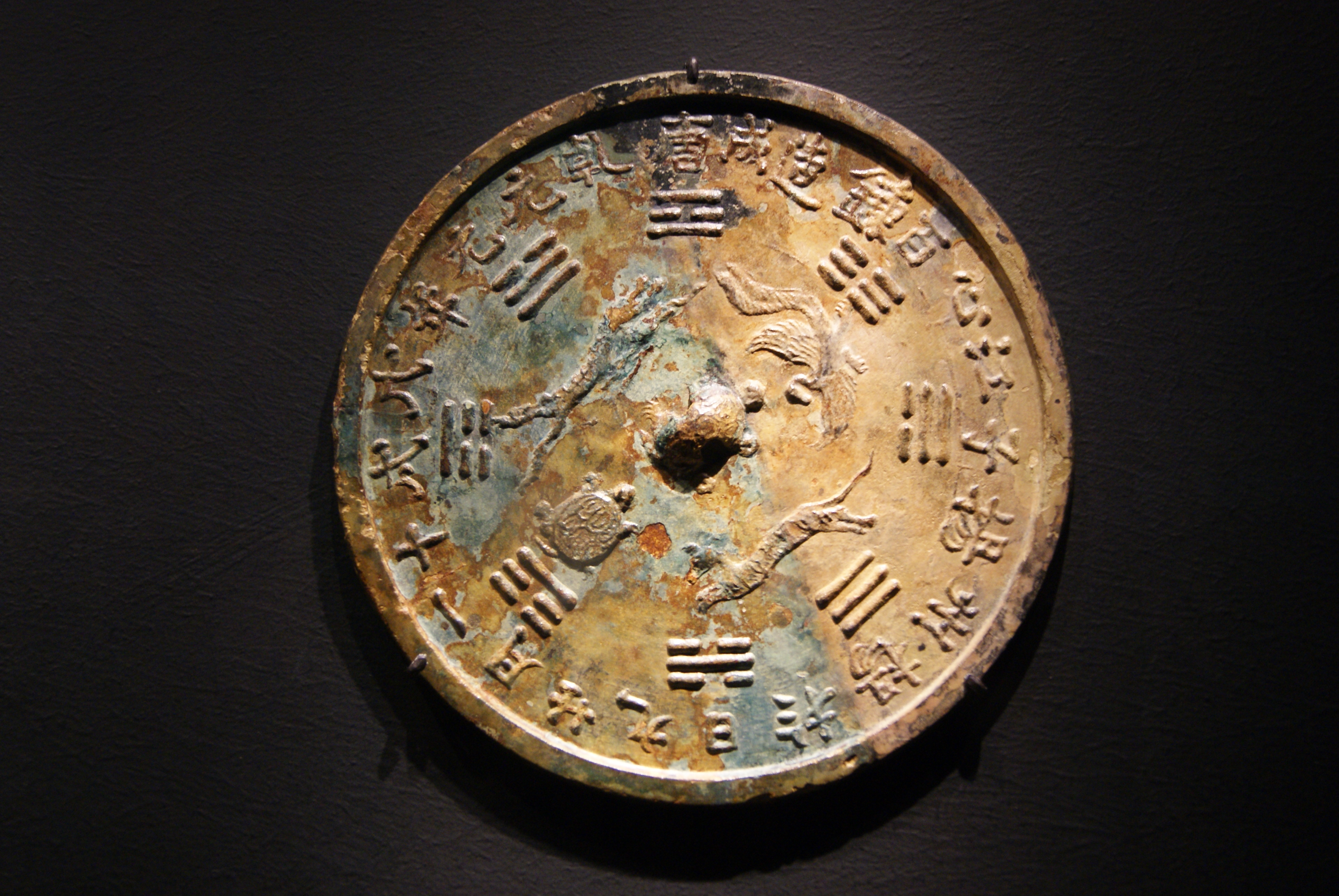
A bronze mirror with cosmological decoration and inscription from the 8th century, reading "Made on the 29th day of the 11th month of the first year of the wuxu era of the Qianyuan reign"

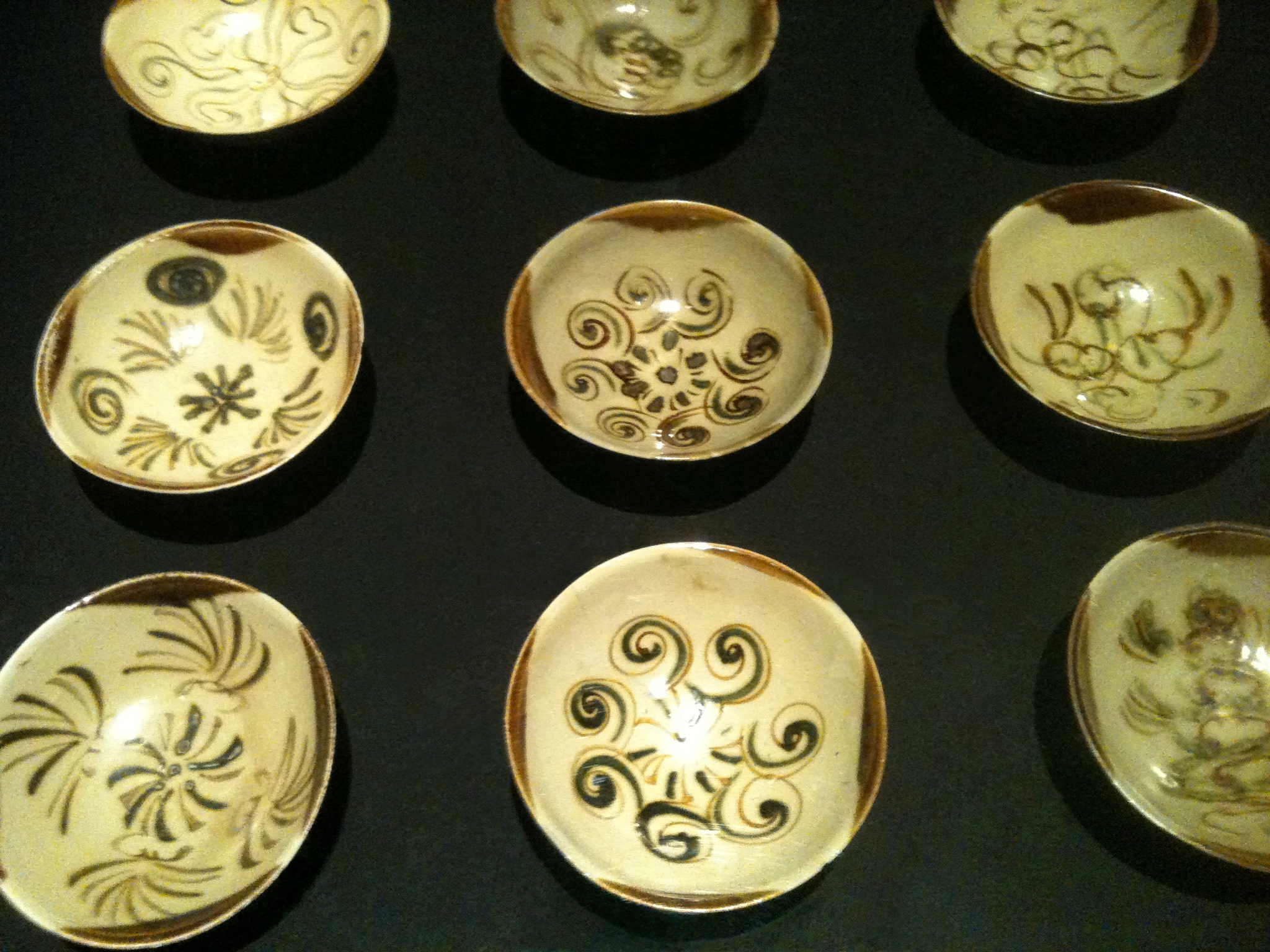
Bowls from kilns in Changsha, Hunan

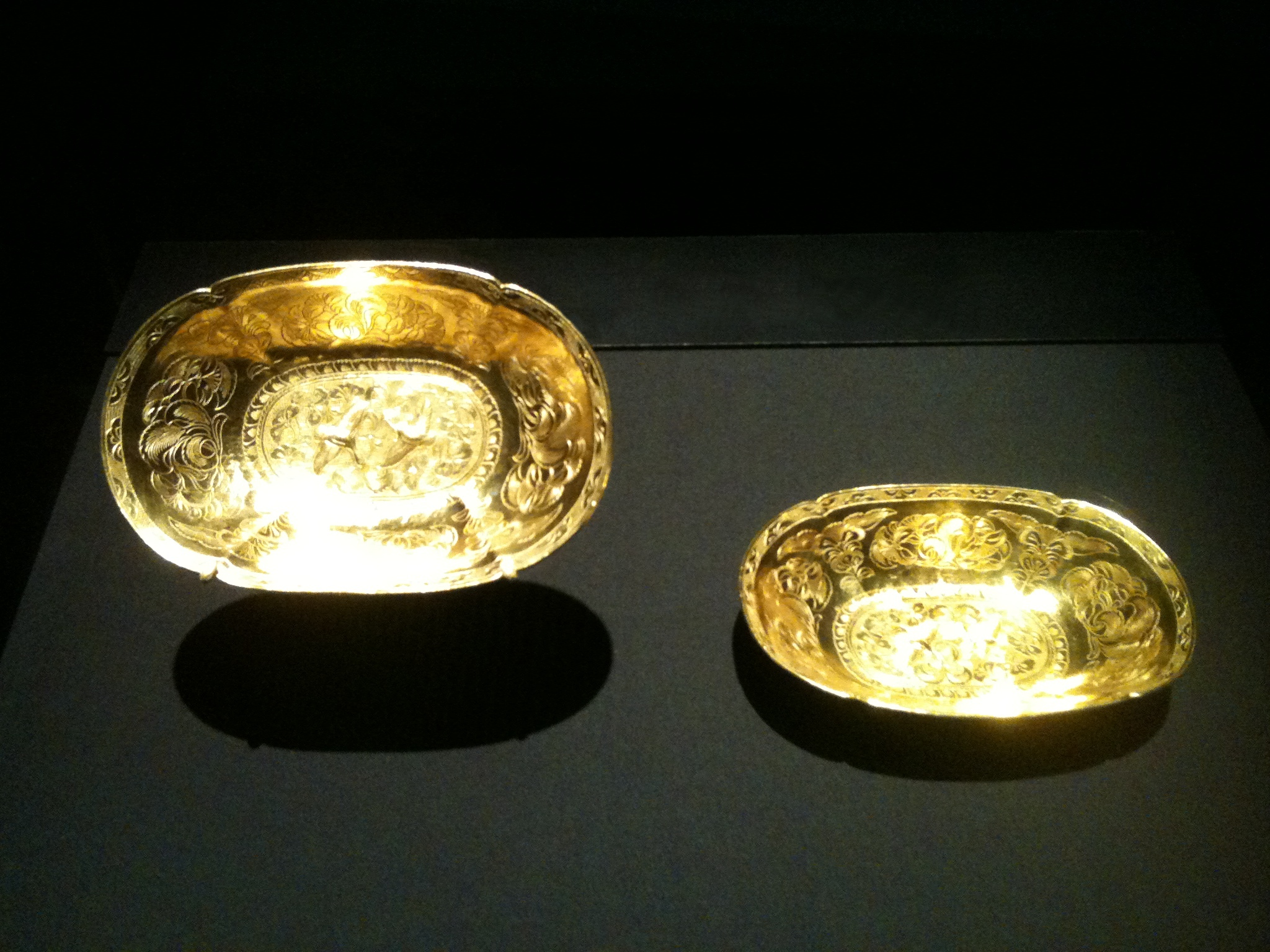
Two Tang oval-lobed gold bowls, each decorated with two ducks in repoussé amidst chased flowers

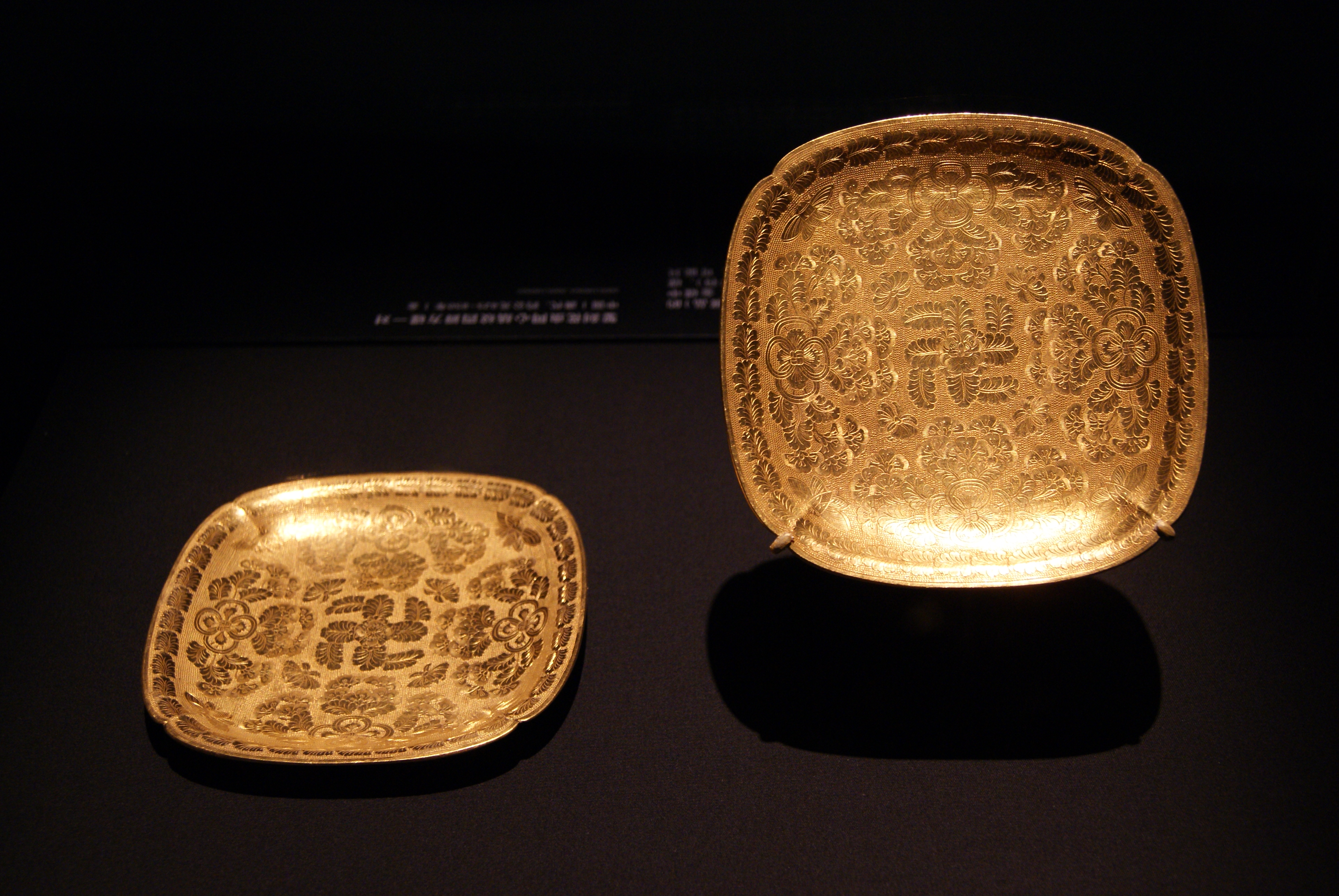
A pair of square lobed gold dishes with chased insects, flowers, and knotted ribbons

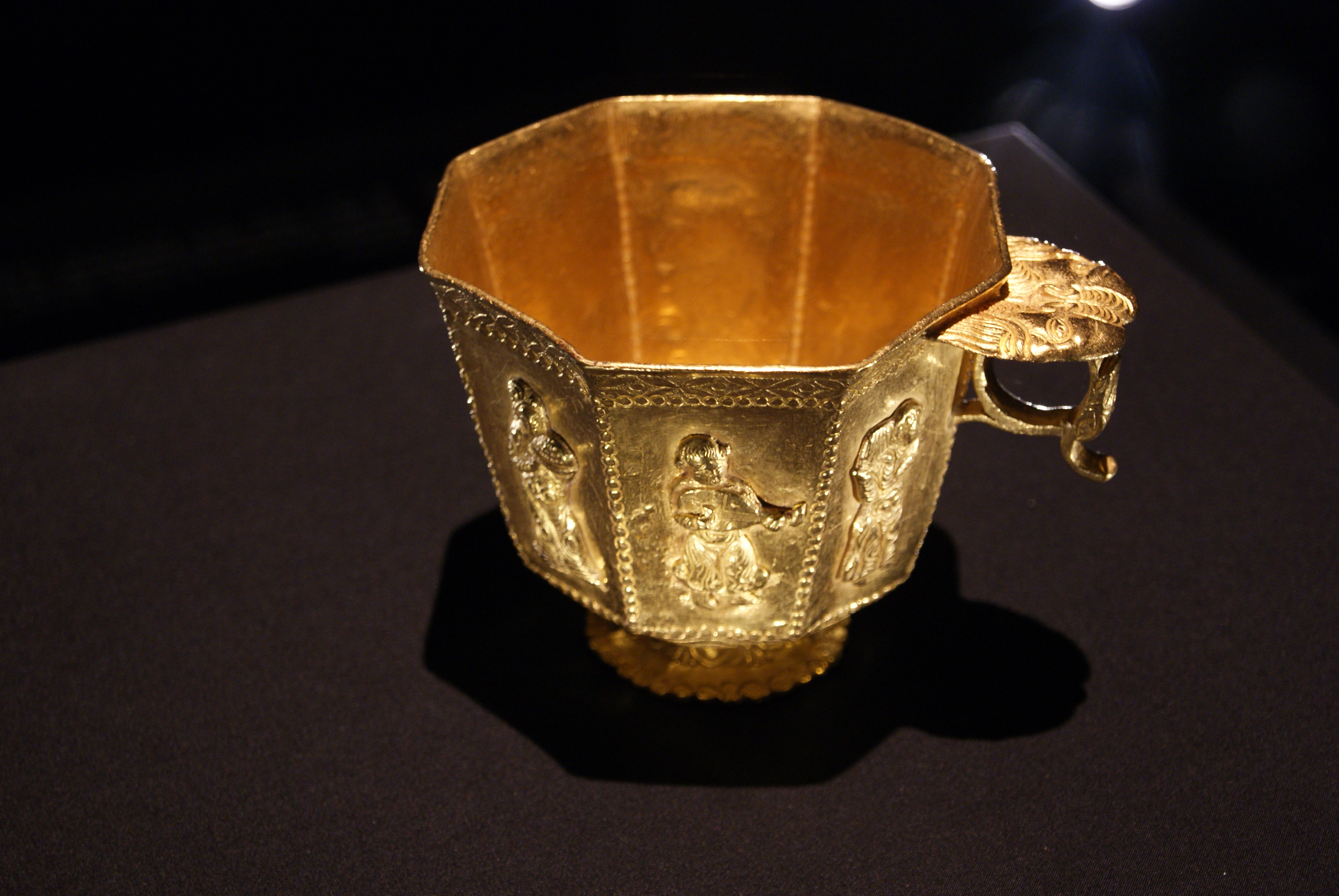
A Tang octagonal gold cup with a thumb plate at the top of its handle, likely produced in Yangzhou, Jiangsu

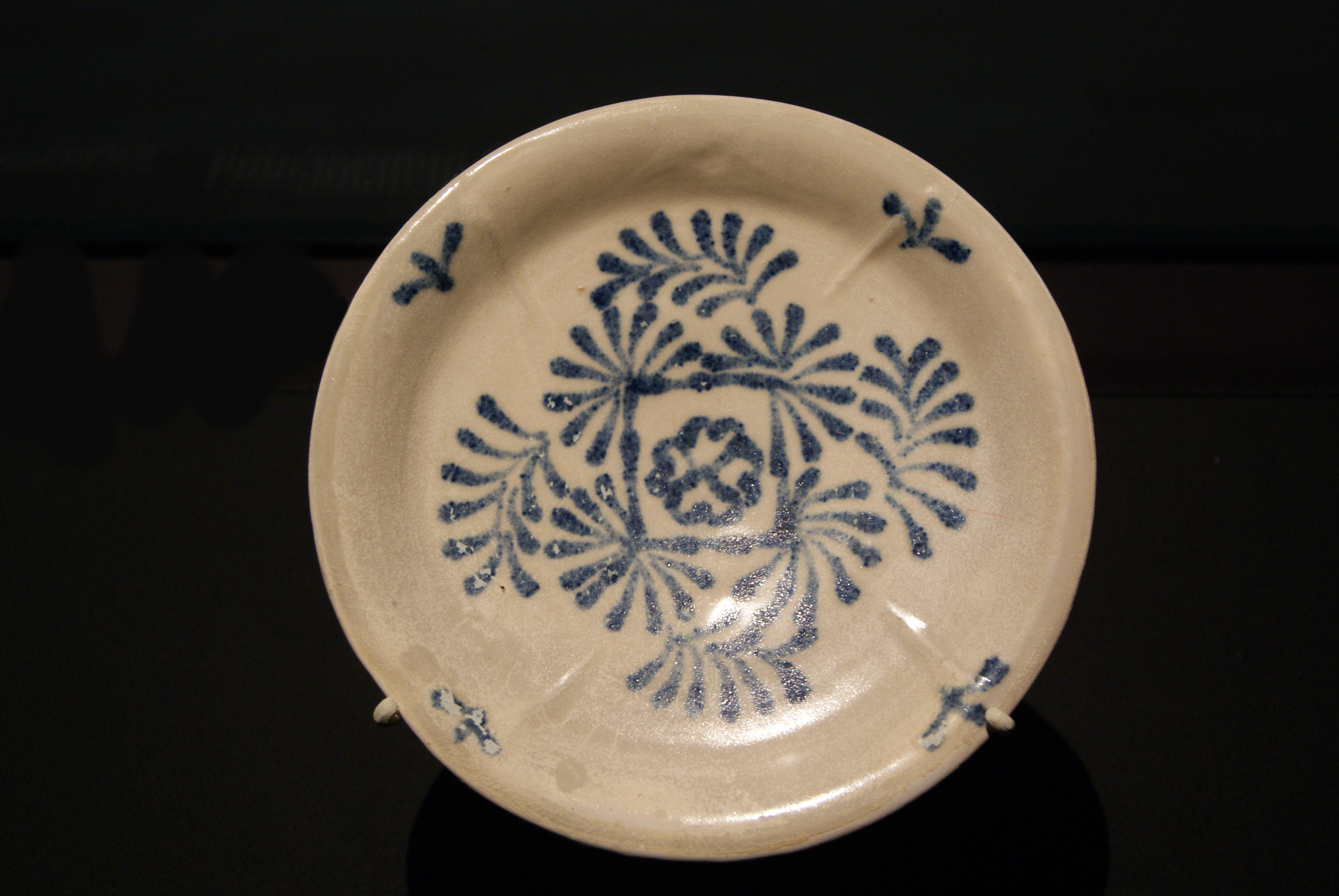
A blue and white stoneware plate with a floral motif (cobalt-blue pigment over white slip), manufactured in kilns in Gongxian, Henan.

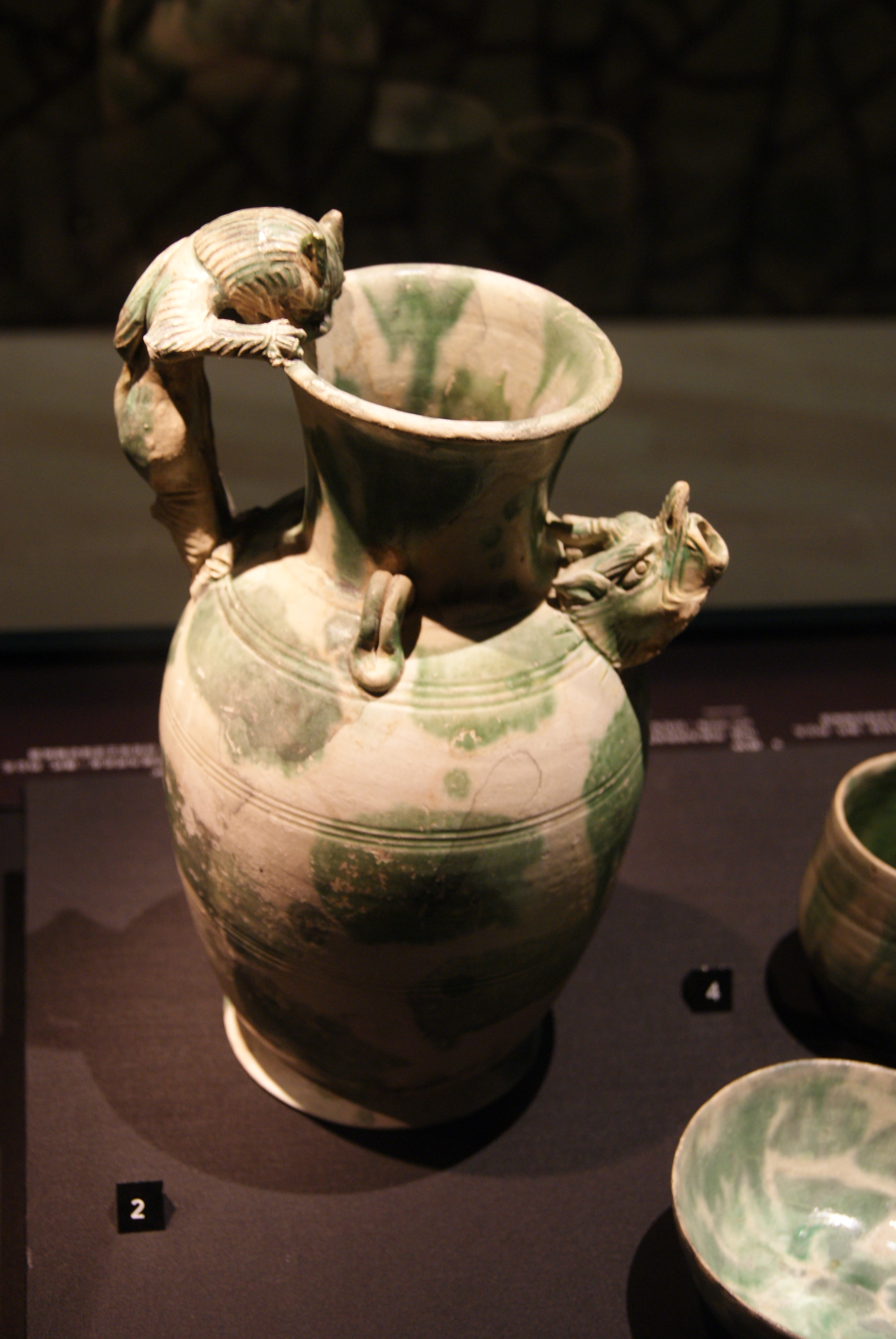
A ewer with lugs, a dragon-head spout, and a feline-shaped handle, possibly from North China (perhaps Hebei)

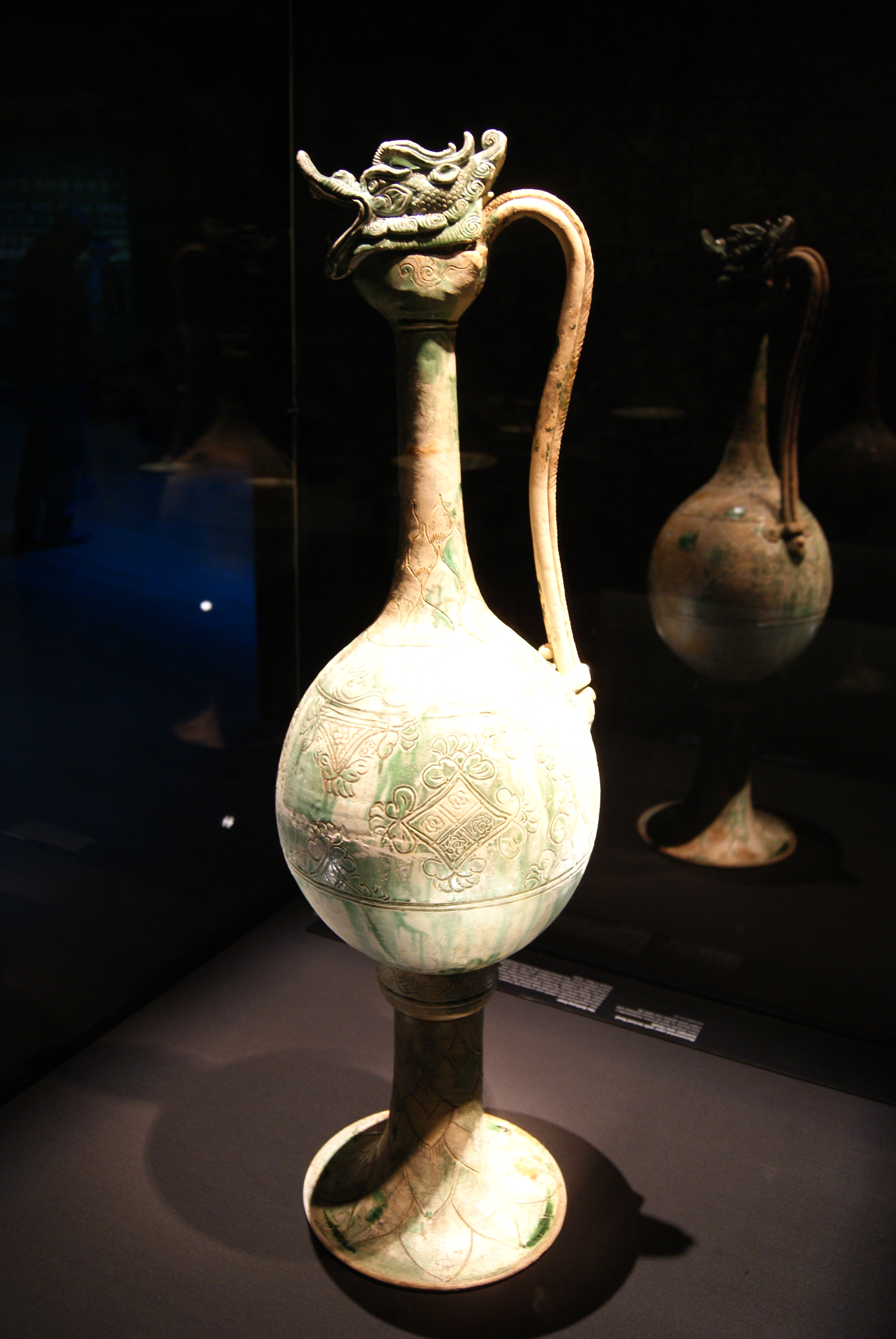
A monumental ewer with incised floral lozenges and cloud designs, made of glazed stoneware with copper-green splashes over a white slip; likely from the Gongxian kilns, Henan

=== Current disposition ===
Tilman Walterfang's company formed a cooperation contract with the original Indonesian salvage company to ensure the cargo was preserved as a single collection rather than sold piecemeal to collectors. Although some looting occurred at the site, especially between excavation periods, Walterfang maintained the integrity of the cargo, allowing it to be studied in its original context. According to Julian Raby, director of the Arthur M. Sackler Gallery, this decision has provided "unparalleled insight into China's industrial capacity and global trade."

The cargo was conserved for six years at a private facility, where artefacts underwent meticulous preservation processes, including desalination, study, and careful restoration by Walterfang's company, Seabed Explorations Ltd of New Zealand. German conservator Andreas Rettel, who trained at the Römisch-Germanisches Zentralmuseum in Mainz, assisted with the conservation work. The artefacts were authenticated by Professor Geng Baochang, a senior research fellow at the Palace Museum in Beijing, a leading expert on antique ceramics and deputy director of Beijing's Forbidden City.

In 2005, the cargo was purchased for approximately $32 million USD by the Sentosa Leisure Group (now the public Sentosa Development Corporation) and the Government of Singapore, and subsequently loaned to the Singapore Tourism Board.

The treasure's debut exhibition took place from 19 February to 31 July 2011 at the ArtScience Museum in Singapore. Organized in collaboration with the Smithsonian Institution, The Freer Gallery of Art, the Arthur M. Sackler Gallery, the Singapore Tourism Board, and the National Heritage Board of Singapore, the exhibition was scheduled to tour major museums across Asia, Australia, Europe, the Middle East, and the United States for approximately five years. In 2017, an exhibit titled Secrets of the Sea: A Tang Shipwreck and Early Trade in Asia featured pieces from the shipwreck at the Asia Society and Museum in New York from March 7 to June 4.

In April 2015, it was announced that the Tang Shipwreck collection would find a permanent home at the Asian Civilisations Museum, where it is now displayed in the Khoo Teck Puat Gallery.

== Controversy ==
The Sackler Gallery, part of the Smithsonian Institution, was scheduled to host the U.S. premiere exhibition of the Belitung cargo in early 2012, timed to coincide with the Smithsonian museum's 25th-anniversary celebration. However, on June 28, 2011, it was reported that the museum had postponed the exhibition. The postponement followed criticism surrounding the timing and nature of the original excavation of the artefacts, sparking debate over whether the exhibit should proceed. According to The New York Times, "a group of archaeologists and anthropologists from the National Academy of Sciences — including Robert McCormick Adams, a former leader of the Smithsonian" sent a letter to Smithsonian Secretary G. Wayne Clough on April 5, 2011, warning that "proceeding with the exhibition would 'severely damage the stature and reputation' of the institution." Critics argued that the excavation was commercially motivated and conducted so rapidly that significant information about the crew and cargo may have been lost. Additional concerns were raised by the Society for American Archaeology, the Council of American Maritime Museums, and the International Committee for Underwater Cultural Heritage, as well as Smithsonian staff from the anthropology department and the Senate of Scientists at the National Museum of Natural History, urging the Smithsonian to reconsider the exhibition.

Opponents of the exhibition argued that showcasing the artefacts would contravene international agreements on underwater excavations. Kimberly L. Faulk, a marine archaeologist and vice chairwoman of the non-governmental Advisory Council on Underwater Archaeology, commented that "by proceeding with the exhibition the Smithsonian — which is a research institution as well as a network of museums — would be violating its own set of professional ethics and promoting the looting of archaeological sites."

On the other hand, proponents argued that the excavation was legal, conducted in accordance with Indonesian law and at the request of the Indonesian government, following international laws at the time. James P. Delgado, director of maritime heritage at the United States Department of Commerce's National Oceanic and Atmospheric Administration, expressed that "allowing any of the finds from an excavation to be sold betrays the most basic aspects of research," yet he noted that the exhibition could serve as a platform to educate the public about the implications of commercializing underwater heritage rather than canceling it outright.

Tilman Walterfang, head of the company that excavated the wreck, admitted that the situation was "less than ideal", stating that "the Indonesian government, fearful of looting, ordered Seabed Explorations to begin an immediate round-the-clock recovery operation."

Some academics supported Walterfang's excavation efforts. Lu Caixia, a researcher at the Institute of Southeast Asian Studies in Singapore, noted in the International Institute for Asian Studies newsletter that "the excavation of the Belitung has been acknowledged as an admirable example of what can be achieved under difficult conditions in Southeast Asia," and praised Walterfang's commitment to preserving the ship structure and cargo.

Prof. Victor H. Mair, Professor of Chinese Language and Literature at the University of Pennsylvania, also supported the Smithsonian exhibition, emphasizing the "enormous educational and historical value" of the collection and arguing that critics were depriving the public and researchers of valuable knowledge.

Dr. Sean Kingsley, director of Wreck Watch International, noted that historical wrecks like the Belitung should provide positive engagement, reminding readers that "no European or American museum collection is whiter than white" when it comes to the ethics of artefact acquisition.

In an interview with the Science Journal G. Wayne Clough, the 12th secretary of the Smithsonian Institution assuaged the animosities between critics and proponents of the exhibition: "So I don't think there's anything negative here. I think the Smithsonian tried to do it right. When we heard the concerns, we asked the community to come together and talk about it, and we listened, and some people in that audience had their minds changed, as a matter of fact, but not everybody. So, I think it's time in a situation like this to pause, and for the profession itself to say, "Okay, there's a problem, what are you going to do about it? And, you remember, the United States never signed the UNESCO treaty."

=== Conventions by international organisations ===
The Underwater Archaeology Resolutions adopted on 10 September 1993 by the International Congress of Maritime Museums (ICMM) state:

ICMM member museums should follow the Council of American Maritime Museums (CAMM) policy and '...not knowingly acquire or exhibit artifacts which have been stolen, illegally exported from their country of origin, illegally salvaged, or removed from commercially exploited archaeological or historic sites' in recent times (i.e., since the 1990 full Congress of ICMM)."

— International Congress of Maritime Museums

The ICMM resolutions also emphasize that "ICMM members should recognize that artefacts from underwater sites are integral parts of archaeological assemblages, which should remain intact for research and display," and further clarify that "a commercially exploited heritage site is one in which the primary motive for investigation is private financial gain."

The United Nations Educational, Scientific and Cultural Organization (UNESCO) later ratified a set of guidelines for the preservation and excavation of underwater sites at the Convention on the Protection of the Underwater Cultural Heritage, held from 15 October to 5 November 2001. These rules include a preference for preserving artefacts in situ (Note: "The preservation in situ of underwater cultural heritage shall be considered as the first option before allowing or engaging in any activities directed at this heritage.") but go on to state:

The commercial exploitation of underwater cultural heritage for trade or speculation or its irretrievable dispersal is fundamentally incompatible with the protection and proper management of underwater cultural heritage. Underwater cultural heritage shall not be traded, sold, bought or bartered as commercial goods. This Rule cannot be interpreted as preventing: (a) the provision of professional archaeological services or necessary services incidental thereto whose nature and purpose are in full conformity with this Convention and are subject to the authorization of the competent authorities;

— UNESCO

Although UNESCO's guidelines were intended to apply to recent excavations, they were ratified in 2001—two years after the Belitung Shipwreck excavation had already taken place.

== See also ==
- ArtScience Museum
- Belitung
- Cirebon shipwreck, also contains large cargo of Chinese wares
- Jewel of Muscat
