= Afzelia bella =

Conservation status
- Least Concern (IUCN 3.1)

Scientific classification
- Kingdom: Plantae
- Clade: Tracheophytes
- Clade: Angiosperms
- Clade: Eudicots
- Clade: Rosids
- Order: Fabales
- Family: Fabaceae
- Genus: Afzelia
- Species: A. bella

Binomial name
- Afzelia bella Harms

Species of legume

Afzelia bella (common name doussié) is a species of shrub or tree in the family Fabaceae which grows primarily in the seasonally dry tropical biome across West and West Central Africa. It is found in Angola, Cameroon, Central African Republic, Republic of the Congo, Democratic Republic of the Congo, Equatorial Guinea, Gabon, Ghana, Guinea, Ivory Coast, Liberia, Nigeria, and Togo.
