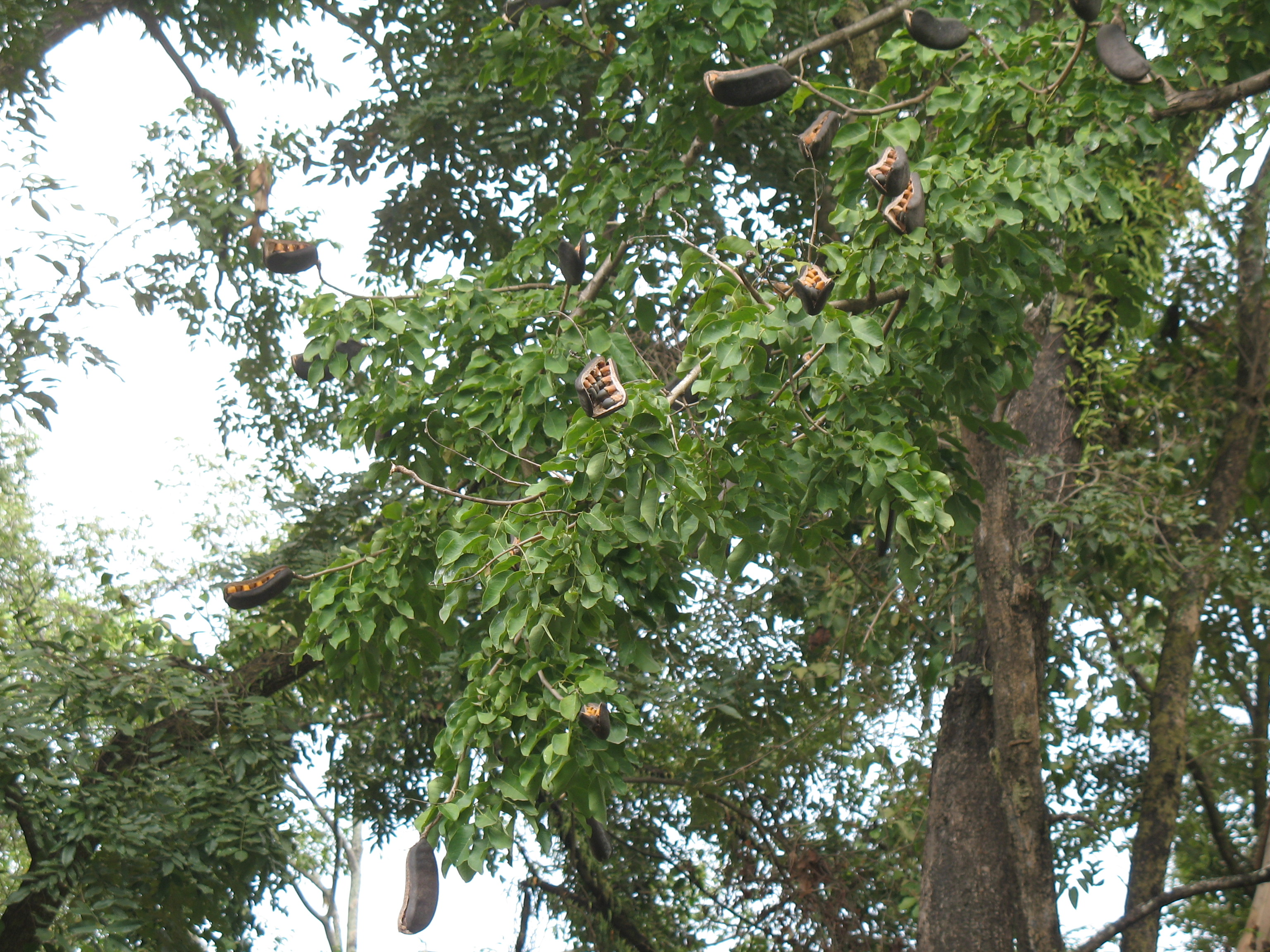

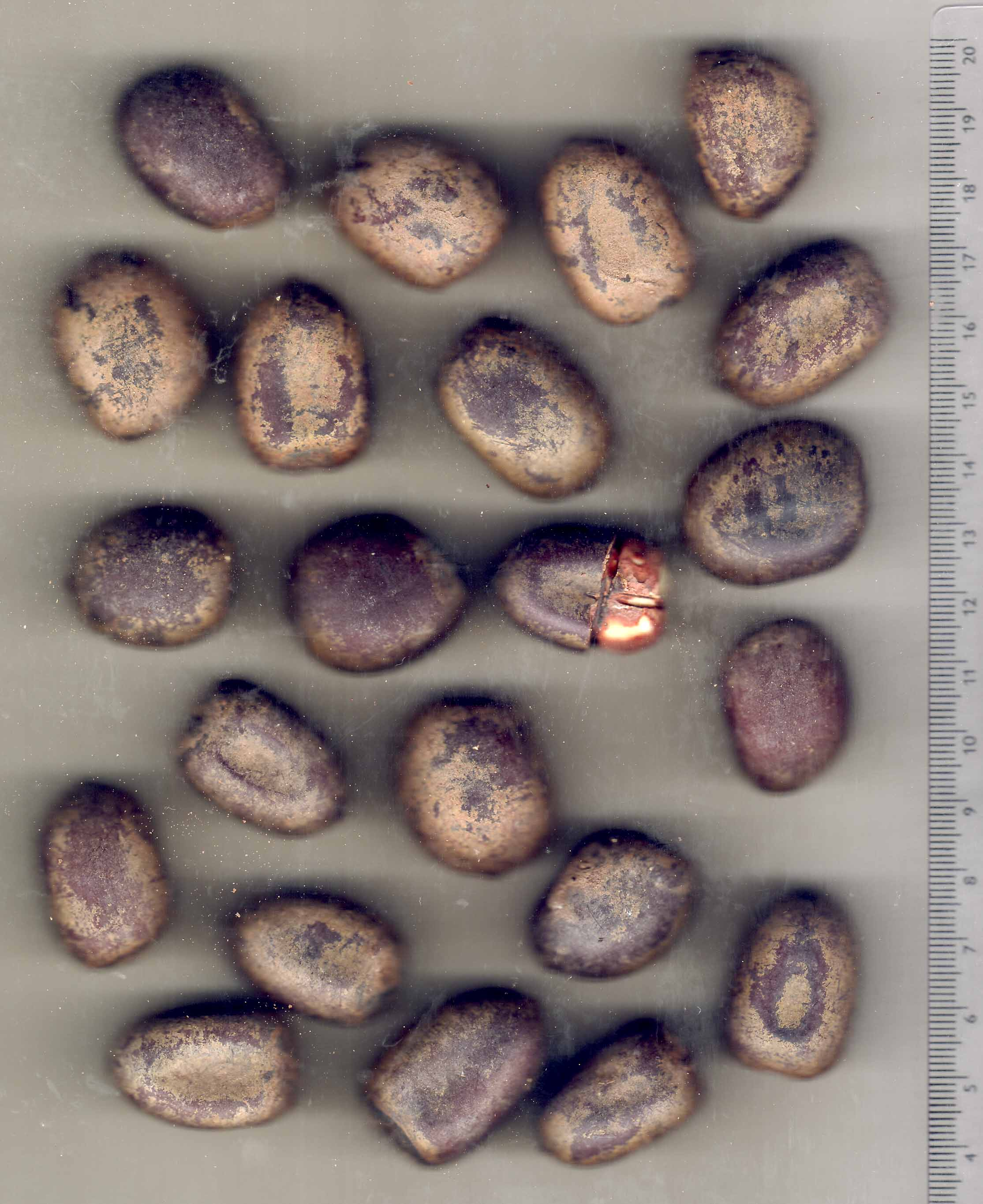
- Makha seeds (Afzelia xylocarpa), yellow arils removed

Conservation status
- Endangered (IUCN 2.3)

Scientific classification
- Kingdom: Plantae
- Clade: Embryophytes
- Clade: Tracheophytes
- Clade: Spermatophytes
- Clade: Angiosperms
- Clade: Eudicots
- Clade: Rosids
- Order: Fabales
- Family: Fabaceae
- Genus: Afzelia
- Species: A. xylocarpa

Binomial name
- Afzelia xylocarpa (Kurz) Craib

Synonyms
- Pahudia xylocarpa Kurz; Afzelia cochinchinensis (Pierre) J.Léonard; Afzelia siamica Craib; Pahudia cochinchinensis Pierre; Pahudia cochinchinensis Pierre; Pahudia macrocarpa Pierre ex Laness.

= Afzelia xylocarpa =

Species of legume

Afzelia xylocarpa is a species of tree in the family Fabaceae. It is from Southeast Asia and grows in Thailand, Vietnam, Cambodia, Laos and Burma in deciduous forests. It can reach 30 metres tall with a trunk up to 2 metres in diameter in a mature specimen.

== Uses ==
The seeds are harvested for medicinal purposes. The seed pulp can be used to make cigarettes, and the bark and seed are used for herbal medicine. The highly figured lumber is often sold as Afzelia Xylay. The wood is used for ornamental woodturning, pens, knife handles, carvings, and musical instruments.

In Cambodia, A. xylocarpa (locally known as Beng) are planted as shading trees due to its wide-ranging branches. At roadsides and waterways, the tree provides a good windbarrier and protection from water-driven soil erosion.

== Names ==
The tree has different local names:

- Khmer: បេង [beːŋ]
- Laotian: ຄ່າ [kʰāː]
- Mandarin Chinese: 缅茄 (pinyin: miǎnqié)
- Thai: มะค่า, RTGS: makha, pronounced [mā.kʰâː]
- Vietnamese: Gõ đỏ.
