= Pontian boat =

3rd-5th century boat in Pahang, Malaysia

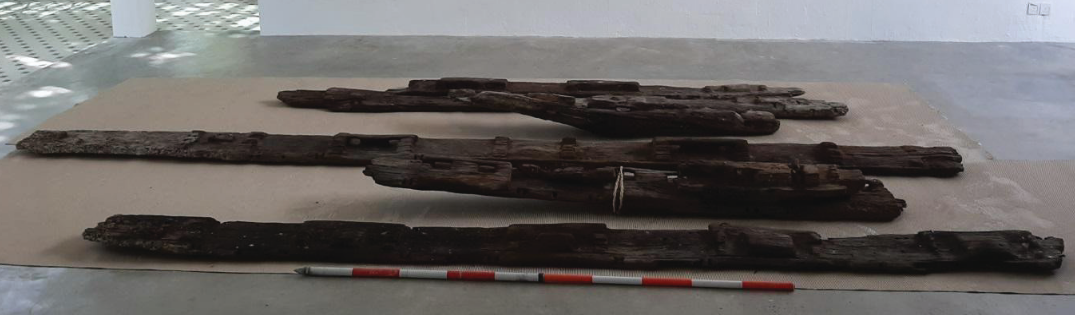
Wreck of the Pontian Boat

The Pontian Boat is an early historic lashed-lug wooden boat discovered on the banks of Pontian river in the state of Pahang, Peninsular Malaysia, in 1926. It is widely regarded as one of the earliest known archaeological examples of a lashed-lug boat in Southeast Asia, with radiocarbon dates placing it between the 3rd and 5th centuries CE.

== Discovery ==
The remains of the boat were first identified in June 1926 by British archaeologist I. H. N. Evans during fieldwork along the Pontian River in southern Pahang. Evans later published a description of the find in the Journal of the Federated Malay States Museum, noting the significance of the vessel as an early example of indigenous boatbuilding in the Malay Peninsula.

Subsequent studies re-examined the find and confirmed that the structure represented part of a plank-built boat rather than a simple dugout canoe. The surviving timbers were transferred to museum care soon after their discovery to prevent further deterioration.

== Dating ==
The radiocarbon analysis of the hull planks refined the dating to approximately 260–430 CE, corresponding to the 3rd to 5th centuries CE. This makes the Pontian Boat one of the oldest securely dated boat remains in Southeast Asia.

The boat has been compared in age to other early lashed-lug vessels such as the Butuan boats of the Philippines and the Punjulharjo boat of Java, both of which are generally dated several centuries later. For this reason, the Pontian Boat is often cited as the earliest known lashed-lug boat in the region.

== Construction ==
Archaeological analysis indicates that the Pontian Boat was constructed using the lashed-lug technique characteristic of early Austronesian maritime technology. The preserved planks show raised internal lugs with perforations through which frames and other structural elements would have been lashed using vegetal fibre. The hull appears to have been built from local hardwood, identified by researchers as a type of merawan, a timber widely distributed in the Malay Peninsula and surrounding islands. No metal fastenings were recorded in the surviving sections, suggesting that the hull relied primarily on wooden components and lashings for structural integrity.

== Historical context ==
The dating of the Pontian Boat overlaps with the period of early state formation in mainland Southeast Asia, including the era associated with the polity often referred to as Funan. The vessel is therefore considered important evidence for long-distance and coastal maritime activity in the Malay Peninsula during the early first millennium CE.

Scholars of Southeast Asian maritime history have used the Pontian Boat to demonstrate the antiquity of complex plank-built vessels in the region and to trace the spread of lashed-lug construction across island and mainland Southeast Asia. The find contributes to broader discussions about the role of Malay and other Austronesian sailors in premodern trade networks linking Southeast Asia, South Asia, and beyond.

== Current location ==
The surviving timbers of the Pontian Boat are curated by museum authorities in Malaysia and are associated with displays on regional and state history. Exhibitions and popular writings frequently refer to the vessel as one of the oldest known boat remains in Southeast Asia and as an important symbol of Malaysia's maritime heritage.

== See also ==
- List of surviving ancient ships
