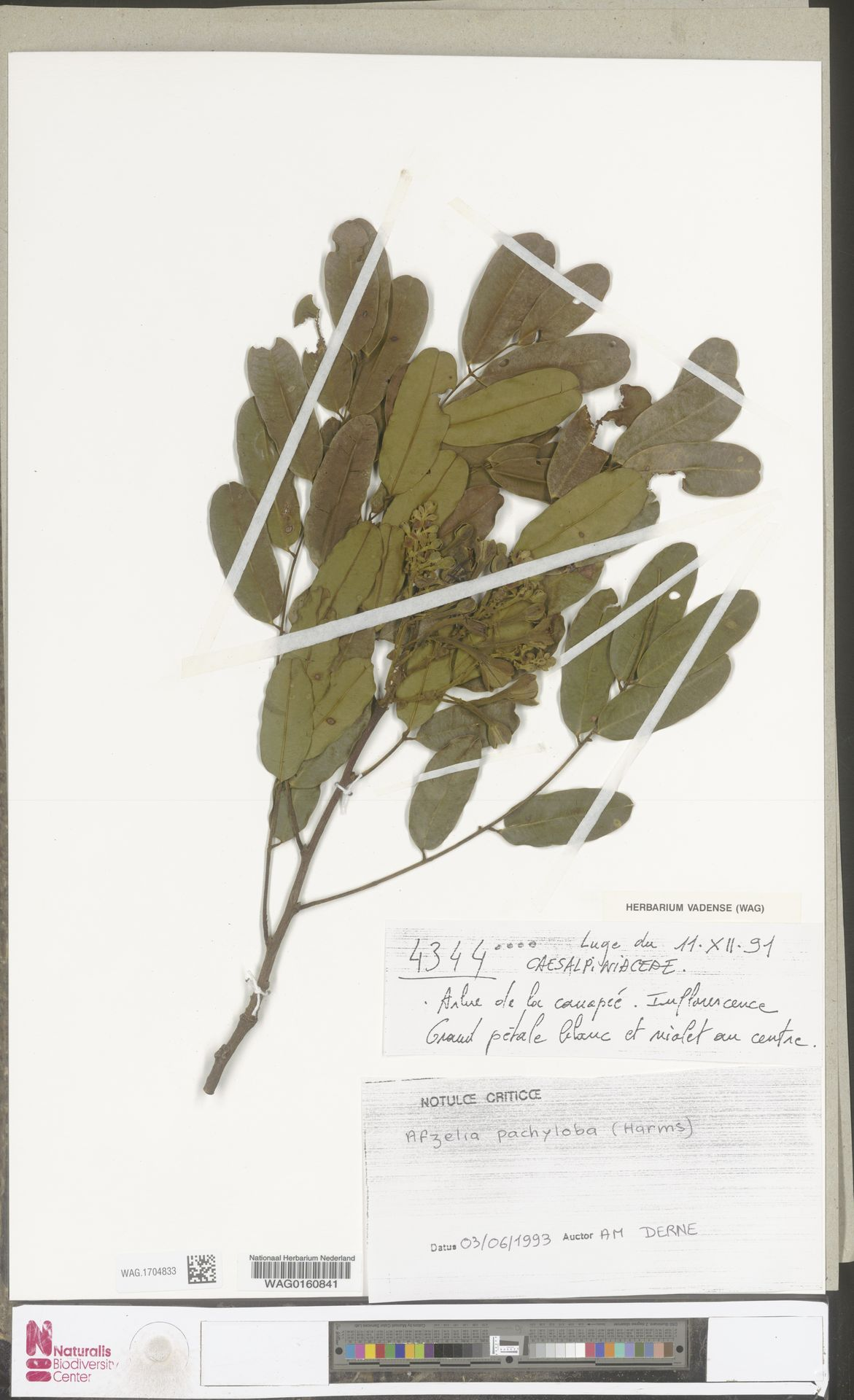

Conservation status
- Vulnerable (IUCN 3.1)

Scientific classification
- Kingdom: Plantae
- Clade: Tracheophytes
- Clade: Angiosperms
- Clade: Eudicots
- Clade: Rosids
- Order: Fabales
- Family: Fabaceae
- Genus: Afzelia
- Species: A. pachyloba

Binomial name
- Afzelia pachyloba Harms

Synonyms
- Afzelia zenkeri Harms; Afzelia brieyi De Wild.; Pahudia brieyi (De Wild.) de Wit; Pahudia pachyloba (Harms) de Wit; Pahudia zenkeri (Harms) de Wit

= Afzelia pachyloba =

Species of legume

Afzelia pachyloba, commonly known as afzelia, white afzelia, doussié, or doussié blanc, is a species of tree in the family Fabaceae that is native to tropical Western and Central Africa. It is harvested for its timber.

== Distribution and habitat ==
Afzelia pachyloba occurs in Angola, Cameroon, the Central African Republic, the Democratic Republic of Congo, Gabon, Nigeria, and the Republic of the Congo. It grows in evergreen and semi-deciduous forests, including secondary forests, at altitudes of up to 200 m (660 ft). It is usually scattered at low densities throughout its habitat and prefers well-drained locations.

== Description ==
Afzelia pachyloba is a medium to large deciduous tree growing up to 40 m (130 ft) tall. The straight, cylindrical trunk may grow to up to 150 cm (59 in) in diameter and may be branchless for up to 25 m (82 ft). The base of the trunk may be fluted or have small buttresses up to 1 m (3 ft 3 in) high. The bark is greyish to brown and scaly. The leaves are paripinnate, each bearing between 5 and 10 pairs of leaflets arranged opposite one another. The petiole and rachis measure 6–20 cm (2.4–7.9 in) long. The leaflets are oblong to oblong-lanceolate in shape and measure 2–6 cm (0.79–2.36 in) by 1–2.5 cm (0.39–0.98 in). The inflorescence is a panicle growing up to 20 cm (7.9 in) long. The bisexual flowers are zygomorphic, with four sepals and one petal, and have a sweet fragrance. The fruit is a flattened, dehiscent, kidney-shaped pod that measures 13–20 cm (5.1–7.9 in) by 9–13 cm (3.5–5.1 in) and contains up to 15 seeds. The seeds are black with a yellow aril covering up to a quarter of its length.

== Uses ==
The wood of Afzelia pachyloba is durable and resistant to both humidity and wood-eating insects. It is traded on the international timber market as doussié, a name also applied to timber from other Afzelia species, and is primarily exported from Cameroon. It is used for boat-building, construction, firewood, furniture, mine props, musical instruments, sports equipment, turnery, and railway sleepers.

== Conservation status ==
Afzelia pachyloba is listed as vulnerable on the International Union for the Conservation of Nature's Red List under criteria A1d, based on the decline of its population due to exploitation. It is heavily harvested for its timber and relatively few seed trees remain.
