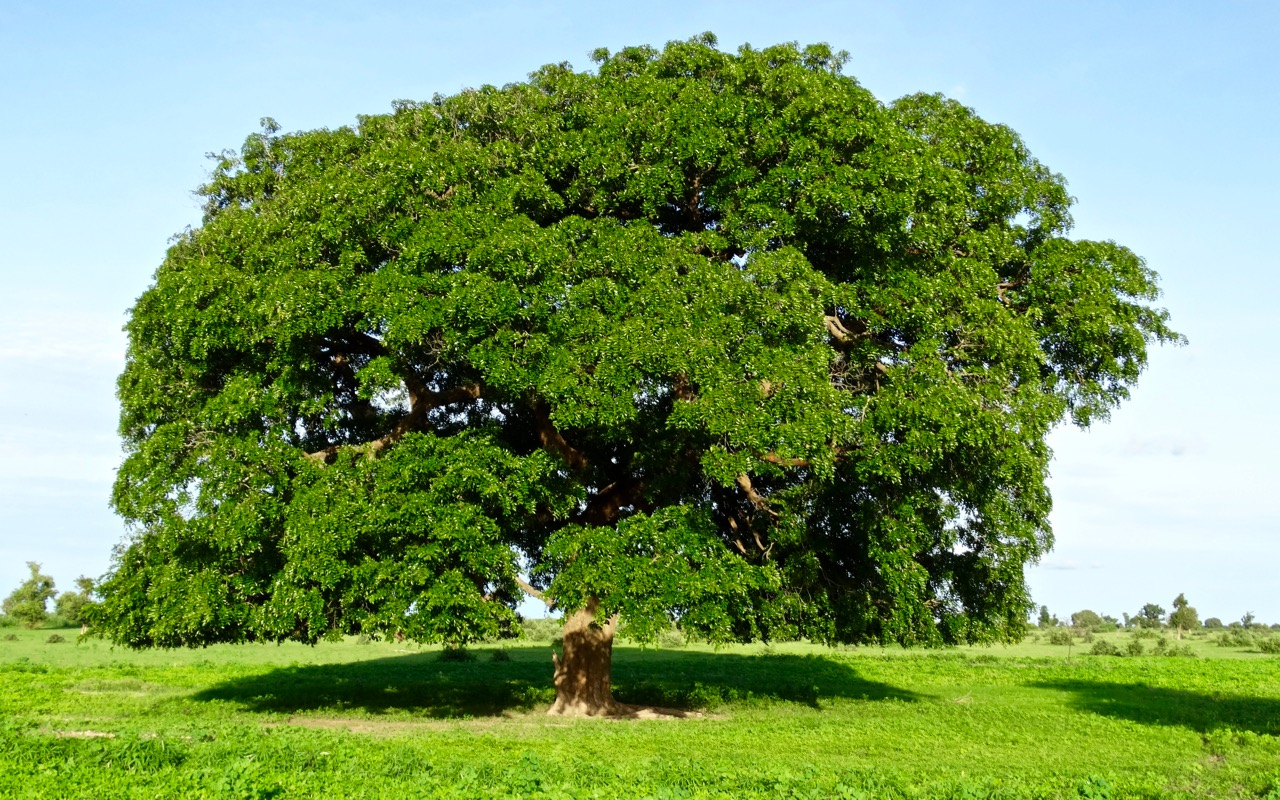

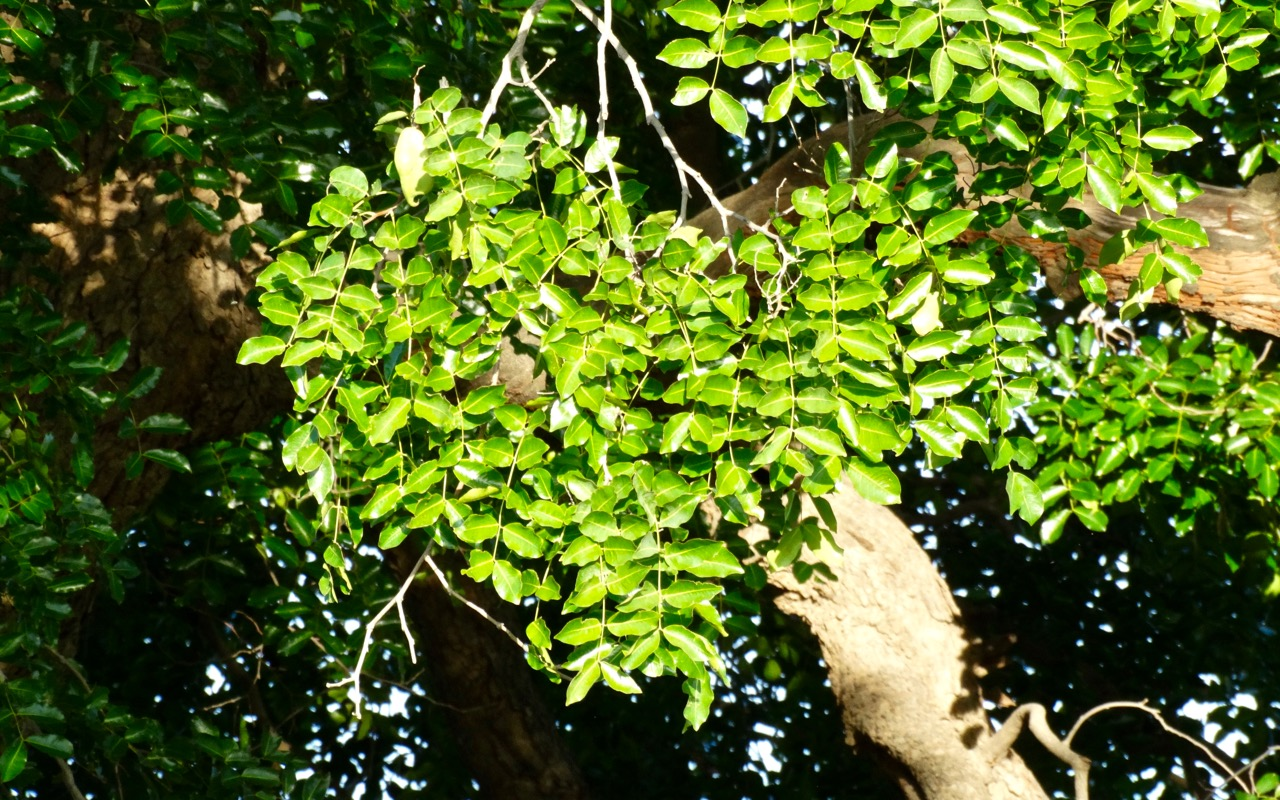
- Habit in Gniby, Senegal, with foliage below

Conservation status
- Vulnerable (IUCN 3.1)

Scientific classification
- Kingdom: Plantae
- Clade: Tracheophytes
- Clade: Angiosperms
- Clade: Eudicots
- Clade: Rosids
- Order: Fabales
- Family: Fabaceae
- Genus: Afzelia
- Species: A. africana

Binomial name
- Afzelia africana Sm.

= Afzelia africana =

Species of legume

Afzelia africana, the African mahogany, afzelia, lenke, lengue, apa, or doussi, is a Myrmecophyte tree species in the family Fabaceae.

== Range ==
It occurs in Benin, Burkina Faso, Cameroon, Central African Republic, Chad, DRCongo, Ivory Coast, Ghana, Guinea, Guinea-Bissau, Mali, Niger, Nigeria, Senegal, Sierra Leone, Sudan, Togo, and Uganda. It is typically found in dense, evergreen forests, but may also be found in the savanna and the coastal forests of East Africa.

== Description ==
Mature trees grow between 6 and 30 m in height. Produces white or greenish-white flowers with a red or pink stripe in panicles. The flowers give way to dark brown or black shiny fruits containing poisonous black seeds attached to an edible orange aril. The trunk diameter may reach 100–170 cm, sometimes more. The leaves are bright green, about 30 cm long, with 7-17 pairs of elliptic or ovate leaflets.

== Uses ==
Afzelia africana was used in the Middle Ages for ship building. It is one of the traditional djembe woods. The building of a reconstructed 9th-century Arab merchantman, the Jewel of Muscat, required thirty-eight tons of Afzelia africana wood, which was supplied from Ghana. Curved trees were chosen for the ship's frames and timbers. The trade name for the wood of this species is doussié; it is known for being resistant to decay and termites.

The leaves are sometimes used as fodder for livestock. The bark is often used for medicinal purposes in West Africa, and some groups regard the tree as "a refuge of invisible spirits".

== Gallery ==
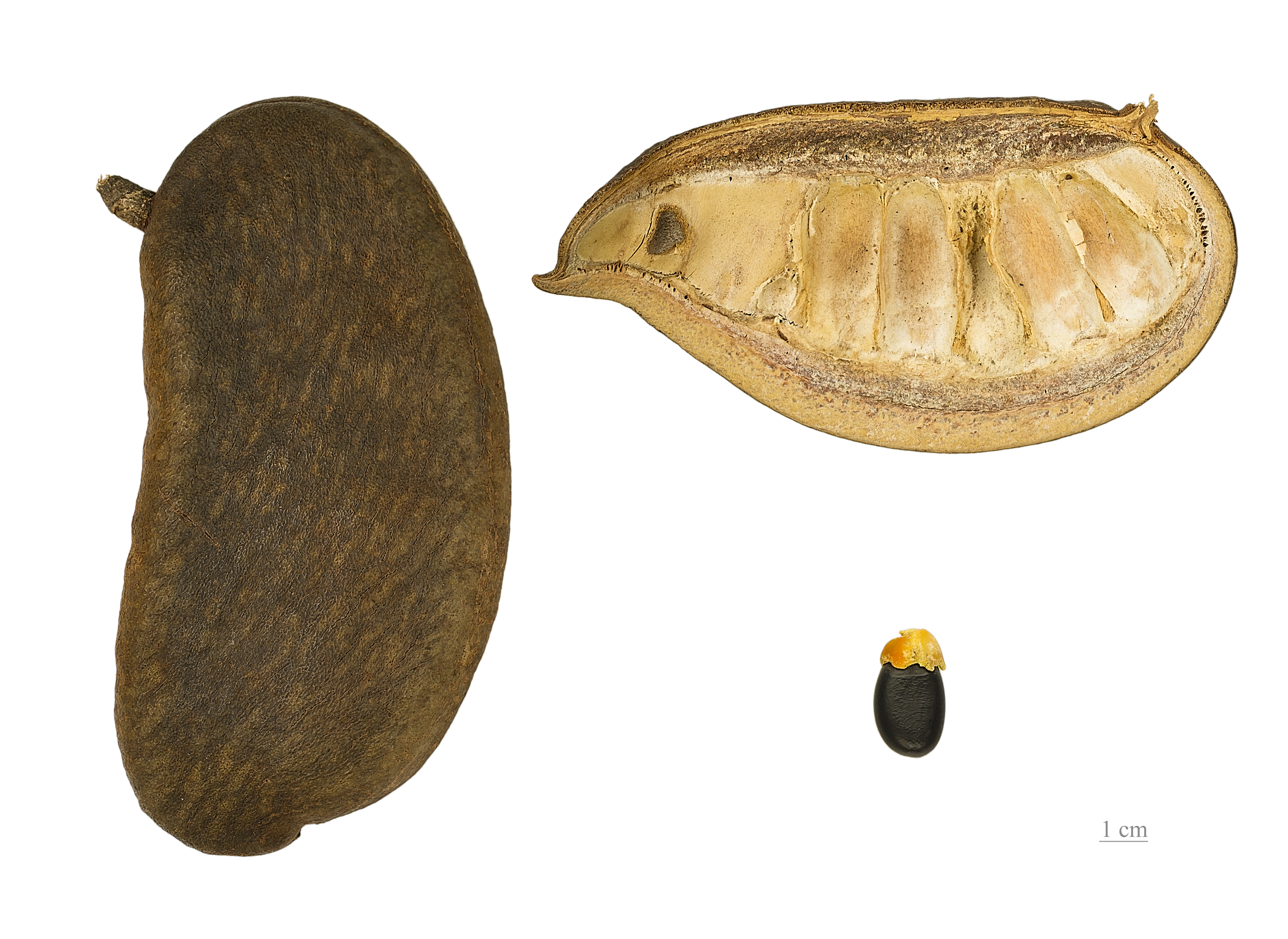
seed pod halves and seed

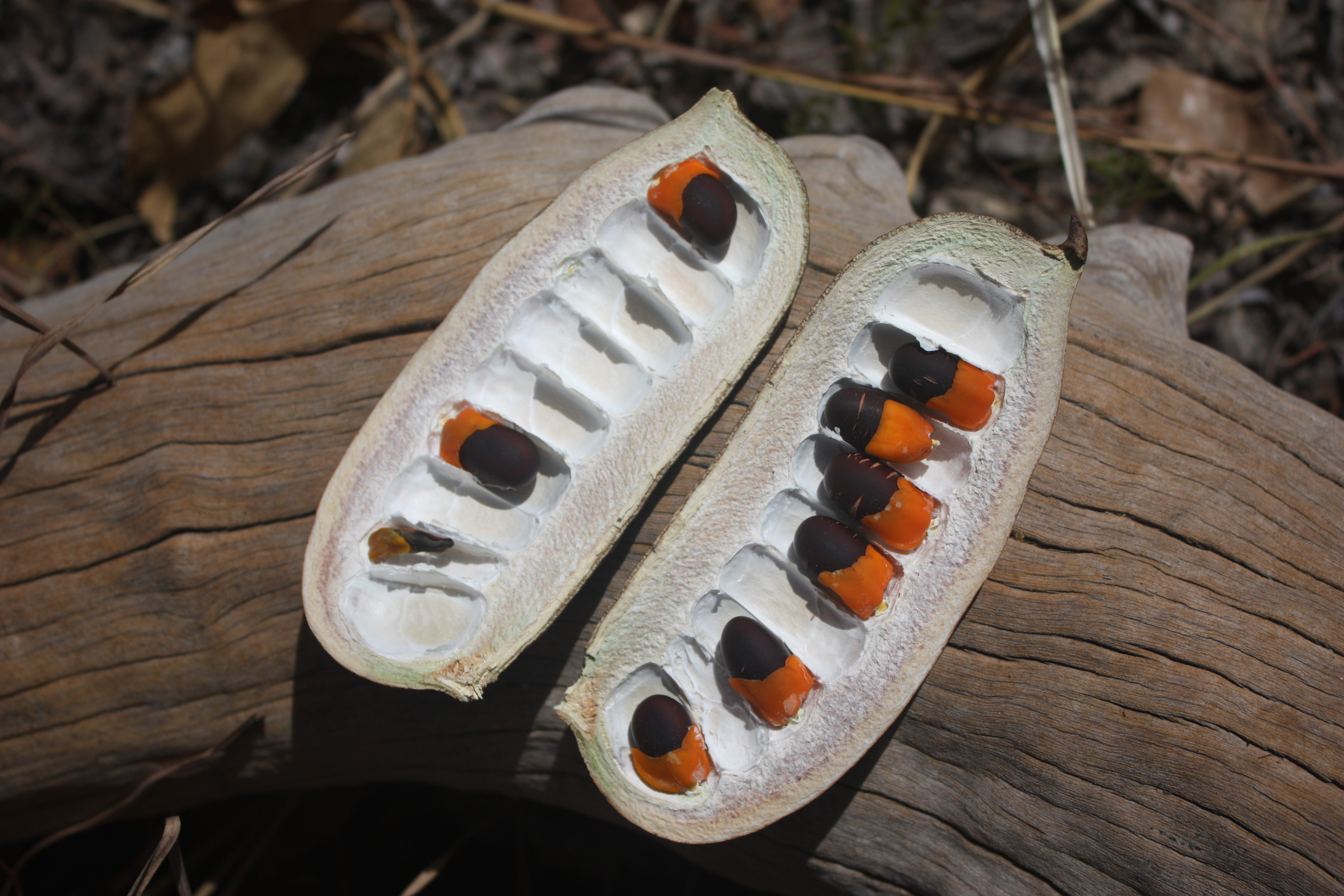
open seed pod with seeds in situ

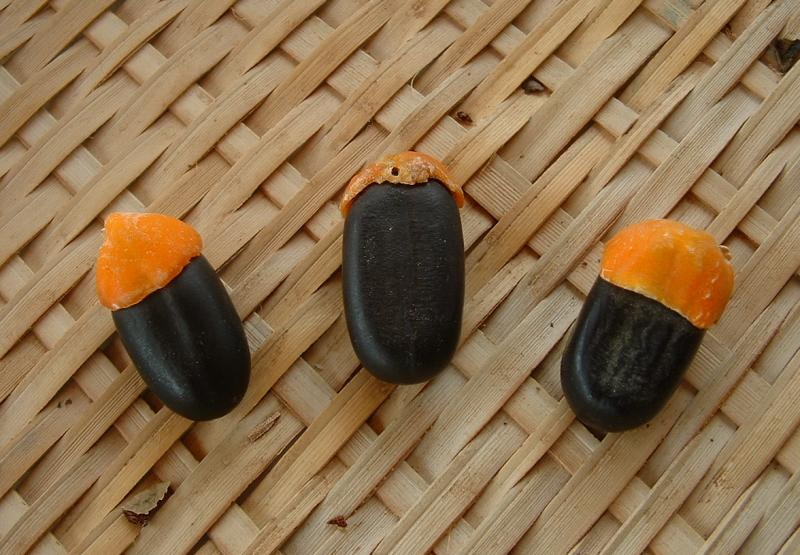
seeds with arils

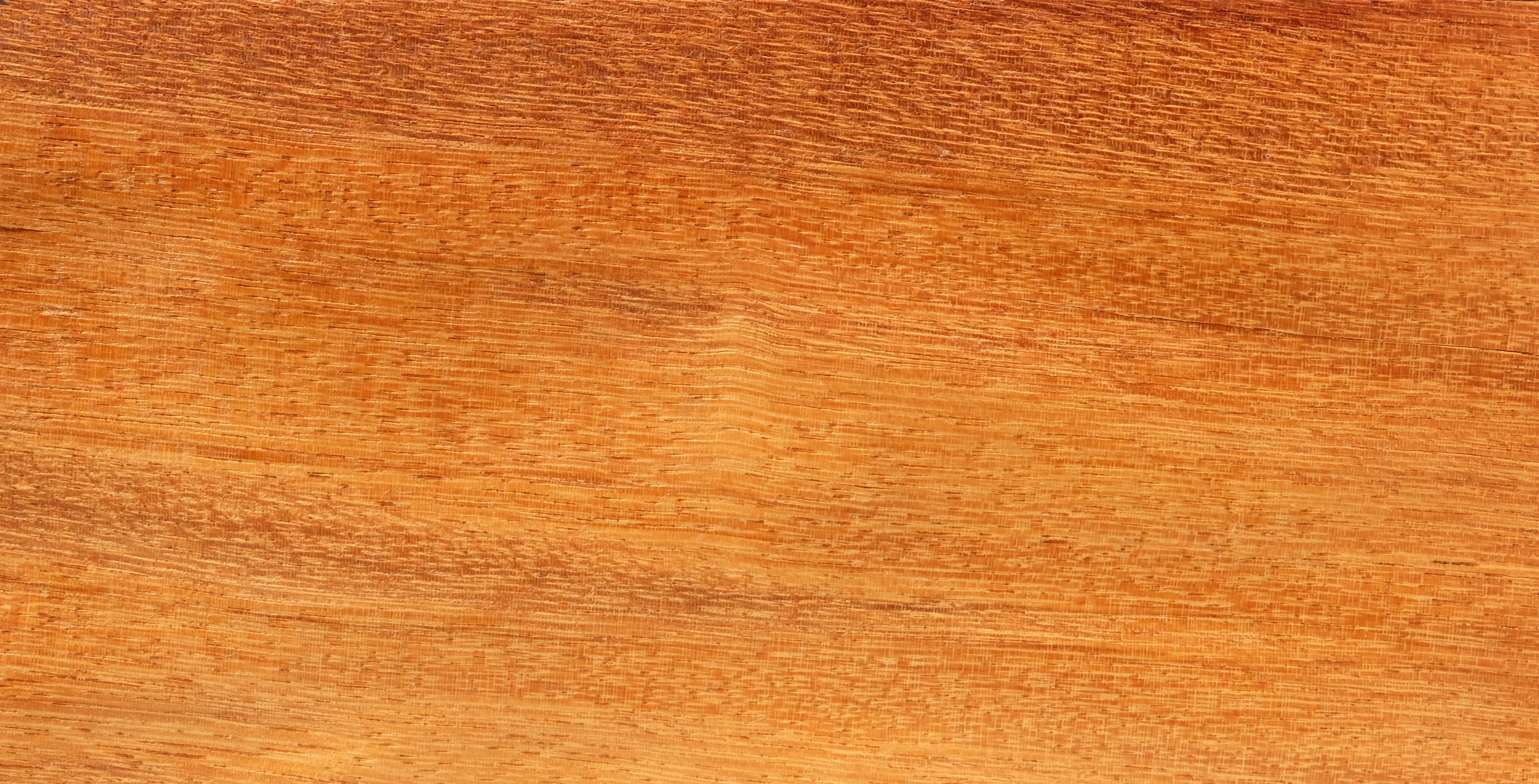
wood sample
