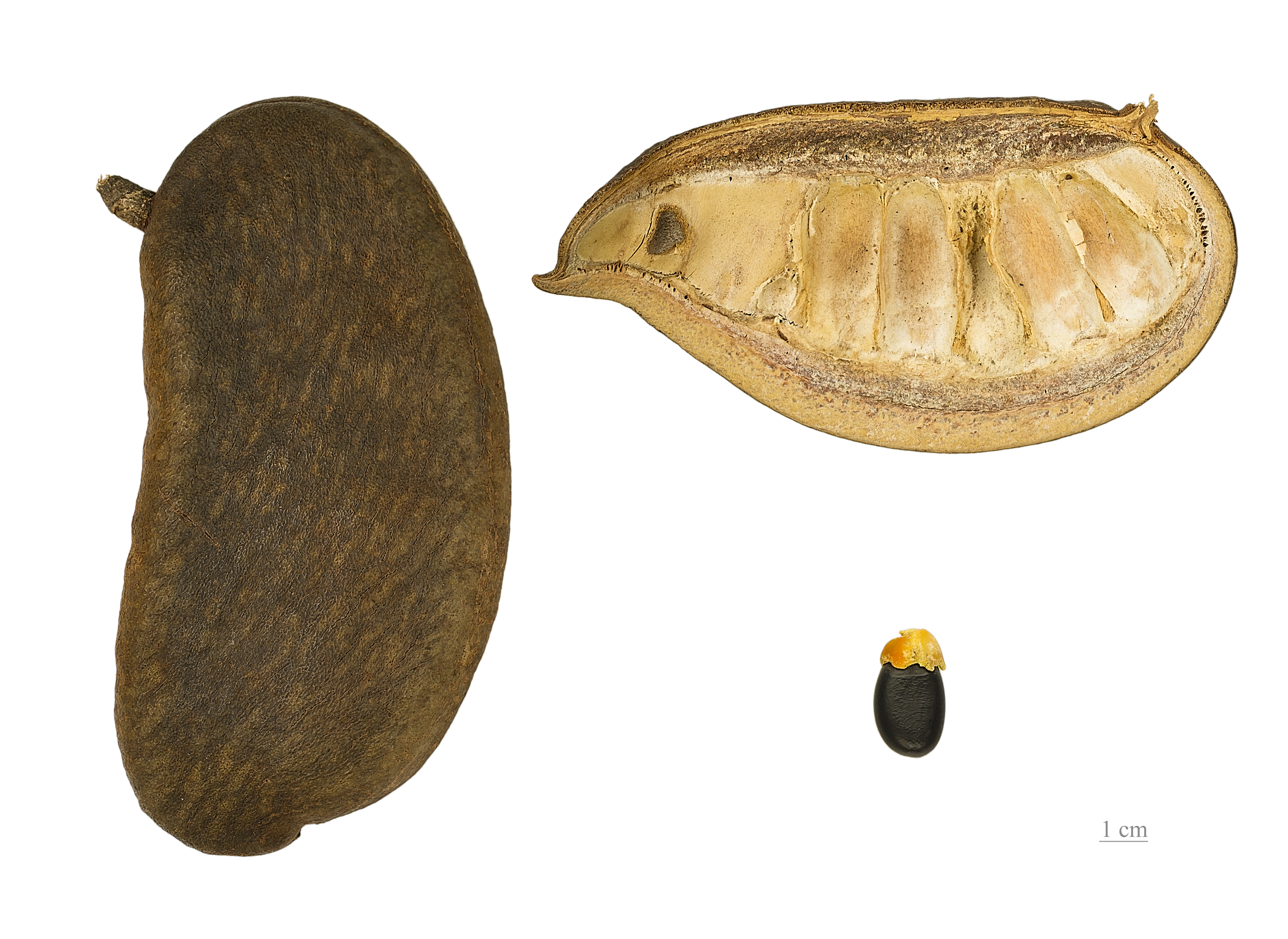
- Afzelia africana fruit and seed - MHNT

Scientific classification
- Kingdom: Plantae
- Clade: Embryophytes
- Clade: Tracheophytes
- Clade: Angiosperms
- Clade: Eudicots
- Clade: Rosids
- Order: Fabales
- Family: Fabaceae
- Subfamily: Detarioideae
- Tribe: Afzelieae
- Genus: Afzelia; Sm. (1798)

Species
- 12; see text

Synonyms
- Afrafzelia Pierre (1899); Pahudia Miq. (1855)

= Afzelia =

Genus of legumes

Afzelia is a genus of plants in the family Fabaceae. The thirteen species all are trees, native to tropical Africa or Asia.

The genus name of Afzelia is in honour of Adam Afzelius (1750–1837), a Swedish botanist and an apostle of Carl Linnaeus.

== Evolutionary history ==
Afzelia is closely related to, and the sister taxon of Intsia. Both Afzelia and Intsia, along with Brodriguesia form the clade Afzelieae within the legume subfamily Detarioideae.

The earliest definitive record of Afzelia in the fossil record is a well-preserved, compression fossil of a leaflet (with cuticle) from the late Oligocene (27.23 Ma) Guang River flora of northwestern Ethiopia (Amhara), named Afzelia afro-arabica. Numerous other records, some which may represent Afzelia (or potentially, Intsia), are known fossil wood occurrences from the Paleogene and Neogene of Africa and Asia and are included in the form genus, Pahudioxylon.

== Species ==
12 species are accepted.

- Afzelia africana Sm. ex Pers. – western tropical Africa to Uganda
- Afzelia bella Harms – western and west-central tropical Africa
- Afzelia bipindensis Harms – Ivory Coast and Nigeria to Uganda and Angola
- Afzelia cambodensis Hance – Cambodia
- Afzelia javanica (Miq.) J.Léonard – Sumatra and Java
- Afzelia martabanica (Prain) J.Léonard – Myanmar
- Afzelia pachyloba Harms – Nigeria to Democratic Republic of the Congo
- Afzelia parviflora (Vahl) Hepper – West Africa (Liberia to Côte d'Ivoire) and Angola
- Afzelia peturei De Wild. – Democratic Republic of the Congo and Zambia
- Afzelia quanzensis Welw. – Somalia to Angola and South Africa
- Afzelia rhomboidea (Blanco) Fern.-Vill. – Sumatra, Java, Borneo, and the Philippines
- Afzelia xylocarpa (Kurz) Craib – Indo-China

== Uses ==
Afzelia species are used primarily for wood, though some species also have medicinal uses. The timber is most commonly traded under the collective name "doussie", as well as under name "afzelia." African species are sometimes traded as "African mahogany" or "pod mahogany", despite the genus being botanically unrelated to Meliaceae (mahogany.)

The seeds are red and black and are used as beads.

The wood is often used as the surface material for outdoor velodromes.

The highly figured wood of the Asian species, Afzelia xylocarpa, is sold as Afzelia xylay. The seeds and bark of this species are used as medicine.

The dense and wavy wood of an Afzelia africana is used in ship-building.
