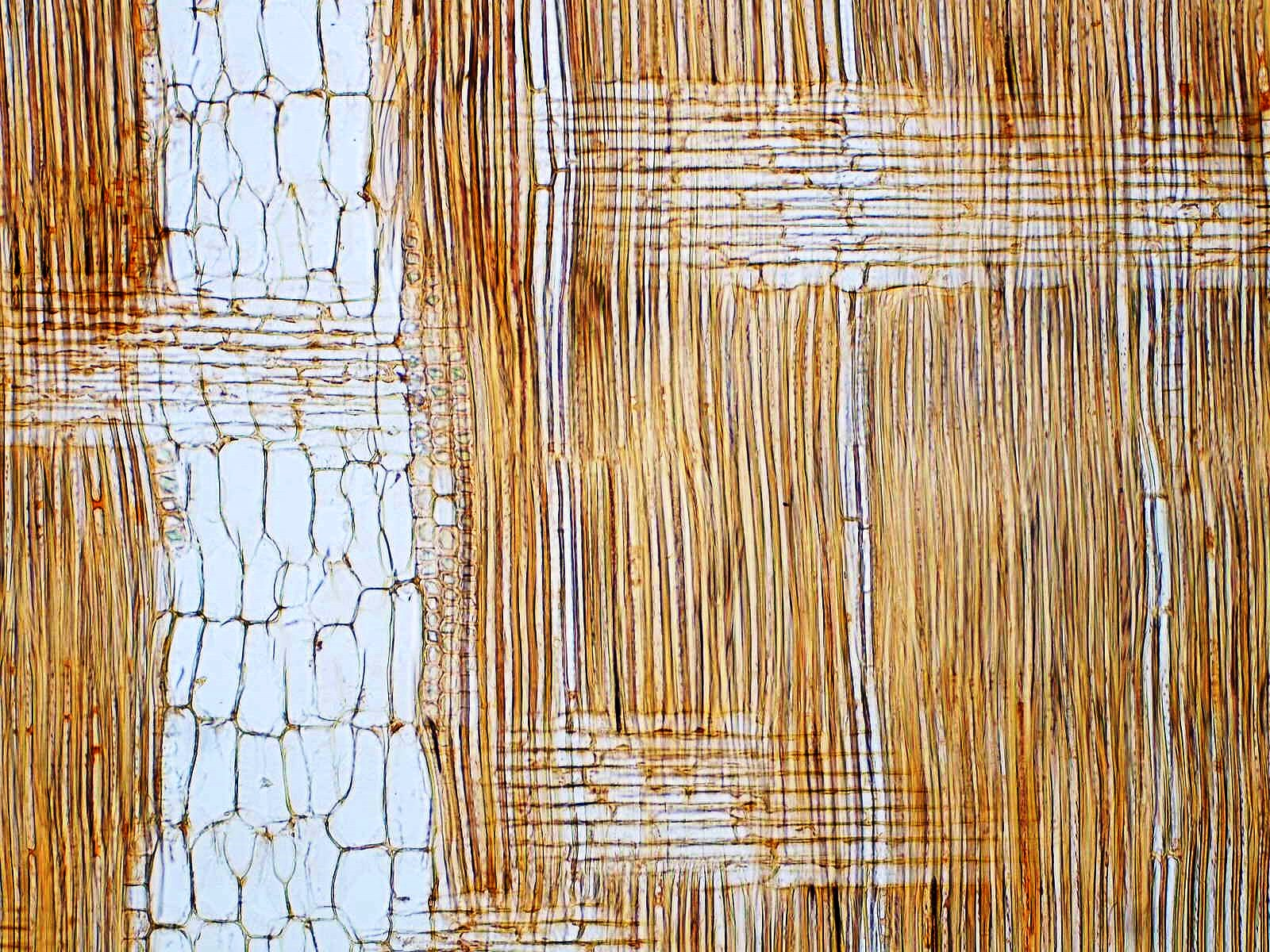
- Micrograph of a radial section of Afzelia bipindensis

Conservation status
- Vulnerable (IUCN 2.3)

Scientific classification
- Kingdom: Plantae
- Clade: Tracheophytes
- Clade: Angiosperms
- Clade: Eudicots
- Clade: Rosids
- Order: Fabales
- Family: Fabaceae
- Genus: Afzelia
- Species: A. bipindensis

Binomial name
- Afzelia bipindensis Harms

= Afzelia bipindensis =

Species of legume

Afzelia bipindensis (common name apa) is an economic species of tropical forest tree in the family Fabaceae. It is found in Angola, Cameroon, Central African Republic, Republic of the Congo, Democratic Republic of the Congo, Gabon, Nigeria, and Uganda. It is threatened by habitat loss.
