= Bago (boat) =

Traditional boat built by the Mandar people of Sulawesi, Indonesia

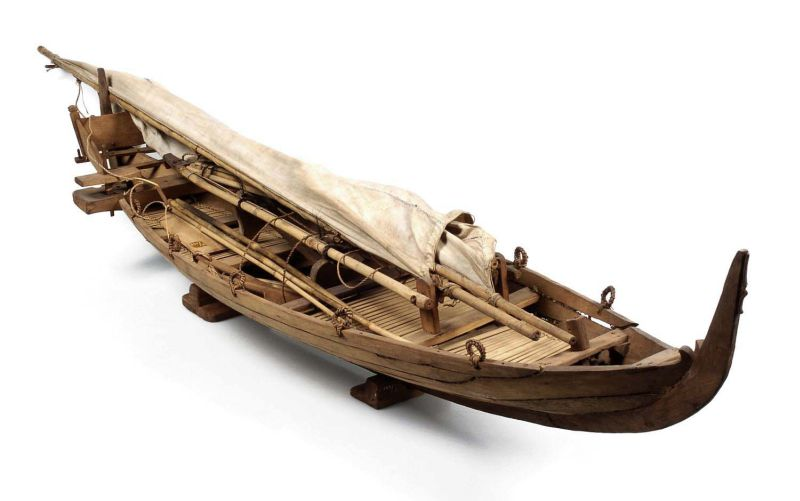
Model of a bago.

A bago is a traditional boat built by the Mandar people of Sulawesi, Indonesia. The hull is of the pajala-type, lightly built and allowing for shallow displacement. The boat is long, with the mast only making up a quarter of its length. A bago can be readily identified as Mandarese boat by its rudderpost style. Smaller-sized bagos are often used as fishing boats from which fishermen cast their nets. The Mandar people prefer using a bago over an outrigger canoe.

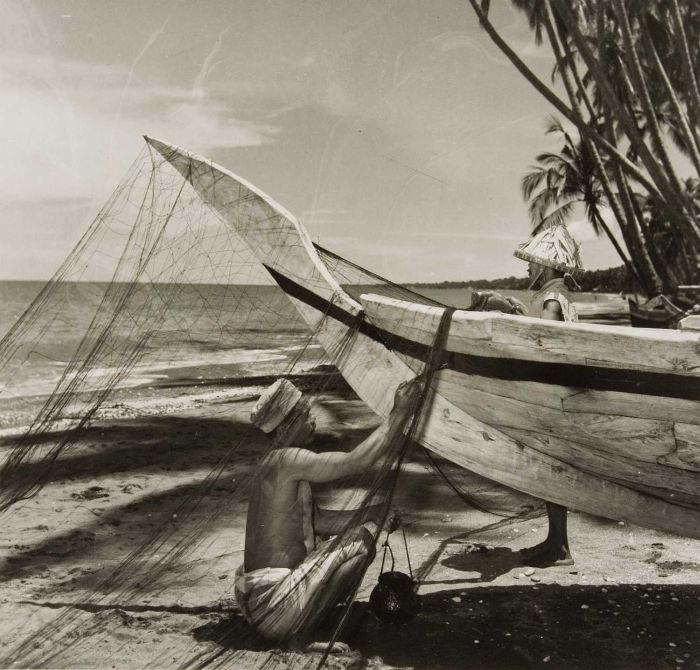
Fishermen at the beach of Galesong, tending to their bago and net. c. 1945–1955.

In the present, small bagos are outfitted with a leti (lete) sail/rig, but not long ago, they had canted rectangular sails (tanja rig). Bigger versions of the bago, also using the pajala-type hull, are sometimes built rather deep and round but without the angle at the end of the keel. These boats can be found all over Mandar coast. A type with nade sail, created the West Sulawesian lambo. Another type, with leti sail and Mandar-style flat-roofed deckhouse, may be mistaken as leti leti. There is not much difference between the two except in the pattern of the placement of the planks and other details that give the characteristics of each manufacturing place of the boat.

== See also ==
- Pinisi
- Palari (boat)
- Padewakang
- Benawa
- Leti leti
- Janggolan
- Lis-alis
