= Leti leti =

Type of traditional transport vessel from East Madura, Indonesia

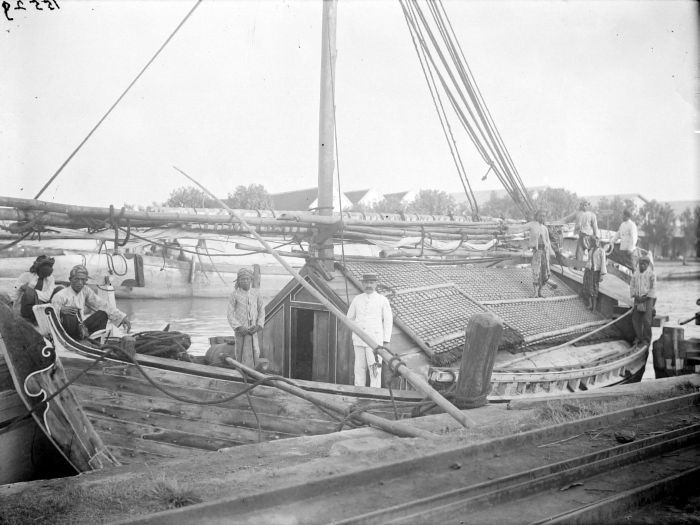
Several Javanese people and a European on a leti leti, before 1917.

Leti leti is a type of traditional transport vessel from East Madura, Indonesia, especially from the administrative district of Sumenep. The leti leti is a recent development, the hull form and sail were developed in the 19th century. In 1979, sailing leti leti numbered about 1,000, but the number reduced over the next decades as more modern, motorized vessel appeared.

== Etymology ==
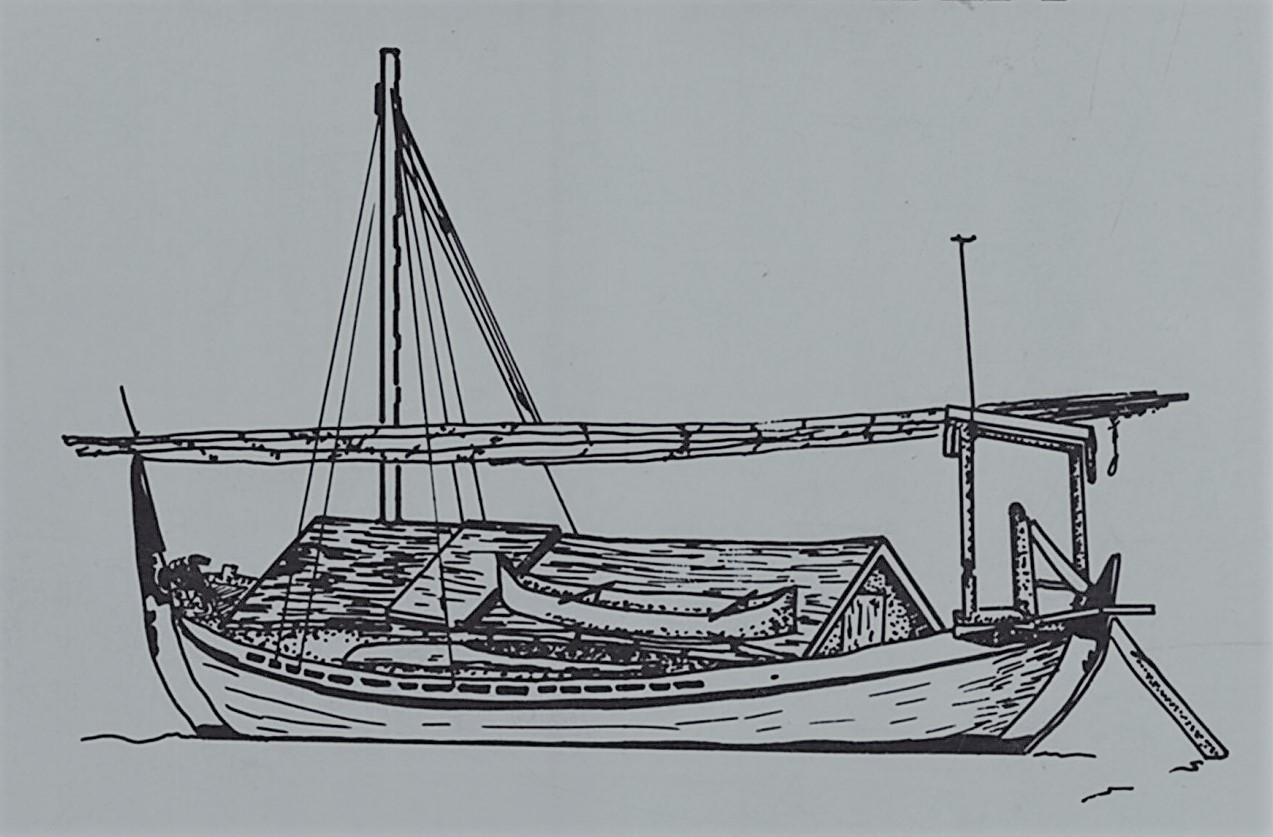
Sekar Aman, a leti leti used for sailing to Australian shores to collect trepang (sea slug), turtle shell and trade with Indigenous Australians.

Leti leti is also known with other names and pronunciation, like leti-leti, letelete, lete lete, letek-letek, leteh-leteh, parao lete', and golekan lete. The origin of the name is unknown. In early 20th century the type was referred to in different publications as tekletek. This is however the same name, with the first syllable dropped: [le]tek-letek, as in [a]lisalis. It may also be possible that the name comes from the sail it used the Madurese lete sail, which was developed in the 19th century. In fact, the "lete" from lete sail is a local pronunciation of lateen sail.

== Description ==
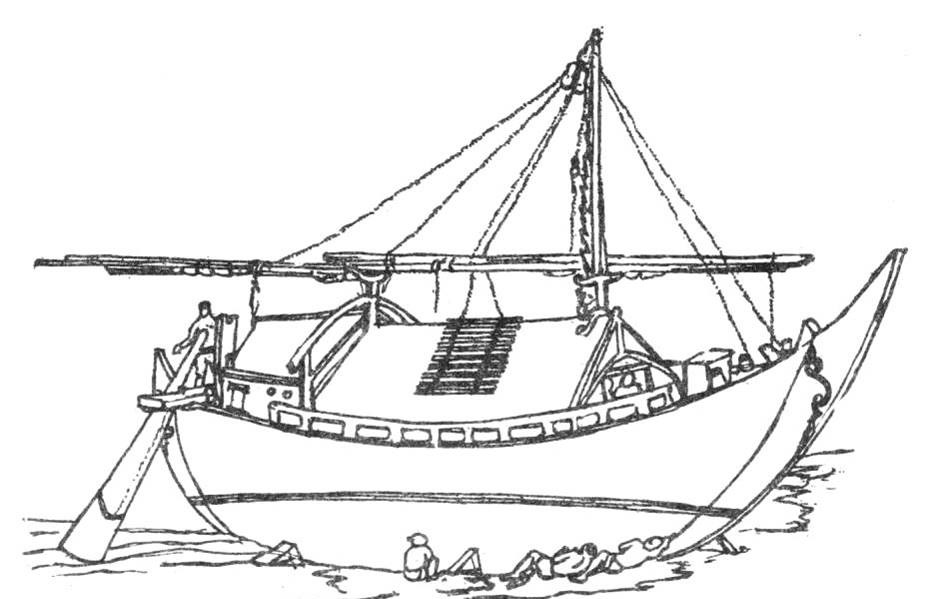
A beached perahu lete' gole'an.

It is a "fat" vessel with short sternpost, with short mast located at the frontside of the deckhouse wall. They are using triangular sail with a very long upper yard. The roof of the deckhouse oftentimes was steep with aftside being higher. At the sea, the small foresail often placed in the bow, and the third sail can be placed above the deckhouse. Madurese leti leti has a pointed deckhouse roof with a vertical post to support the rudder. The Leti leti from Giligenting, easily recognized by squared 'doghouse' abaft the main gabled deckhouse, were common sight at the late 1940s in ports all around the Java Sea, from Sumbawa to Riau.

The Leti leti from Sapudi is distinguishable from Giligenting vessels by the lack of 'doghouse' abaft, and were regarded as the most authentic examples of the leti leti type. Some vessels from the 1970s onward were very large, the largest of all leti leti, and following the motorization in early 1980s, some of them became larger, of a size to rival the largest Bugis vessels. Leti-leti has about 12–41 tons gross tonnage, while the larger leti leti is about 50 gt in weight. The leti leti was an optimal design of small sailing cargo vessel for the Java sea, stoutly built with great load carrying capacity for its length and draught. A full laden leti leti usually doesn't have freeboard. It can be crewed by only 2 people, one is controlling the rudder, the other one managing the sails.

== Role ==
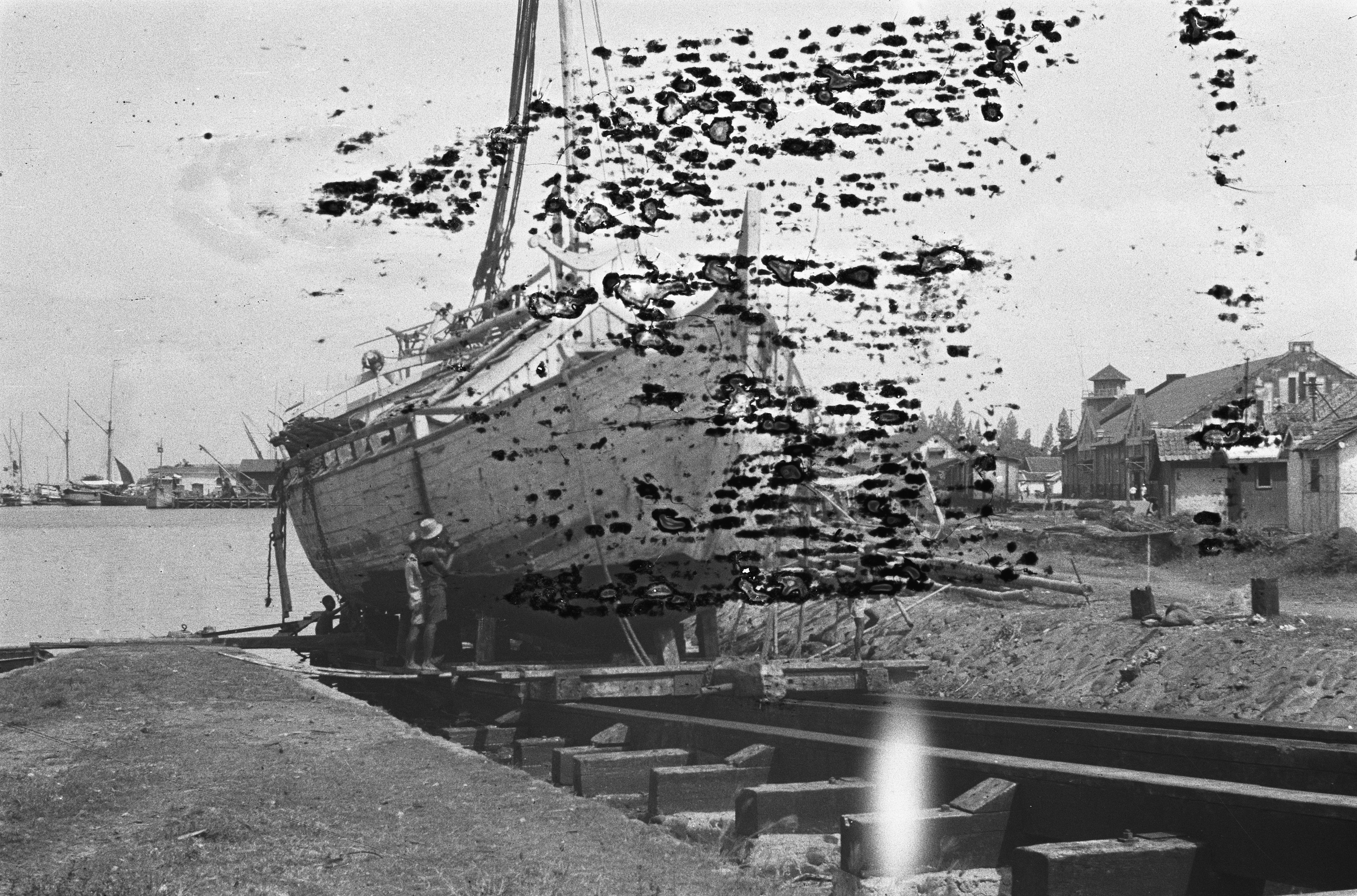
A leti leti in a slipway. Cirebon, October 1947.

Fundamentally, leti leti is a merchant vessel used by Madurese people, just like pinisi of Bugis sailors. Leti leti can be found in northern side of Timor islands to Singapore, but this vessel can also fish as far as Australian coast. Traditionally Madurese traders brought cattles to East Java from as far as Roti island and Kupang in Timor, they also carried salt, rice, and assembled goods out from Surabaya. Modern leti leti, nevertheless, is not the right type of trading perahu for Eastern Indonesian islands: This boat couldn't sail through low tide straits or they're needed a long time to pass, or dealing with blowing winds and gusts around mountainous islands, so the type of perahu used there currently is the lambo.

The fleet of Madurese leti-leti competed with palari-pinisi at the end of the 1930s as the archipelago's greatest trading fleet. In 1960–1970 the number of leti-leti was almost the same as the Bugis/Makassar palari which had a number of around 800–1000 units.

== Mandarese leti leti ==
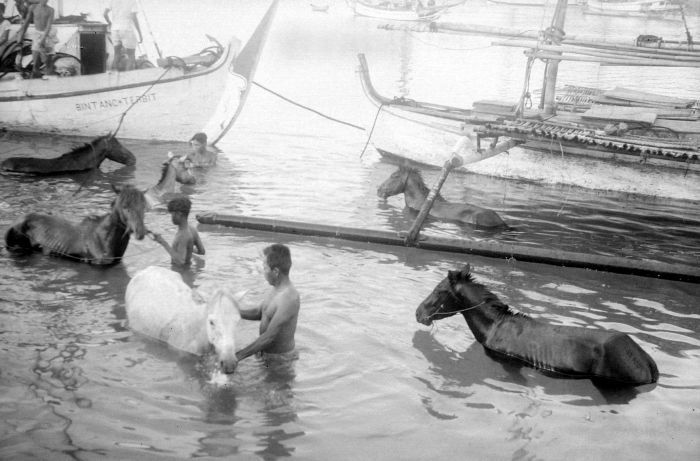
Mandarese sandalwood horses are washed alongside 2 type of Mandarese prahu (lètè and pakoer).

Since 1930s Mandar sailors has adopted the leti leti as one of their small trading perahu along with lambo and bago from West Sulawesi. Originally they got it from Madurese living alongside them in the mixed communities around Java sea such as Marumasa, Masalembu, and Kangean islands, but the current Mandarese vessels always different from Madura vessels. Their difference are Mandar-styled rudder mounting, flat roof on its deckhouse, the absence of paint pattern and black-colored stempost, but always clean, tidy, and organized. They also have flat, blade-shaped rudder that acts as centreboard at the stern of the vessel. In the 1970s many of them can be found on Paotere harbor, Makassar. In the present, they expand its trading range to around the Flores sea and Java sea to overcome poverty in homes.

Mandarese Leti leti, named Bintang Makka, in Makassar.

Leti leti named Kotaradja, 1939. Note the flat deckhouse roof, different from Madurese leti leti which has triangular roof.

== See also ==
Other Madurese vessels:

- Lis-alis
- Janggolan
- Golekan

Other perahu from Nusantara:

- Lambo
- Mayang (boat)
- Pencalang

== Bibliography ==
- Horridge, Adrian (2015). Perahu Layar Tradisional Nusantara. Yogyakarta: Penerbit Ombak. An Indonesian translation of Horridge, Adrian (1985). The Prahu: Traditional Sailing Boat of Indonesia, second edition. Oxford: Oxford University Press.
  - Horridge, Adrian; Snoek, Chris (1985). The prahu: traditional sailing boat of Indonesia (2. ed.). Singapore: Oxford Univ. Press. ISBN 019582637X.
- Stenross, Kurt (2007). The Seafarers and Maritime Entrepreneurs of Madura: History, Culture, and Their Role in the Java Sea Timber Trade. Murdoch University, Perth, Australia.
