= Palari (boat) =

Type of Indonesian sailing vessel from South Sulawesi

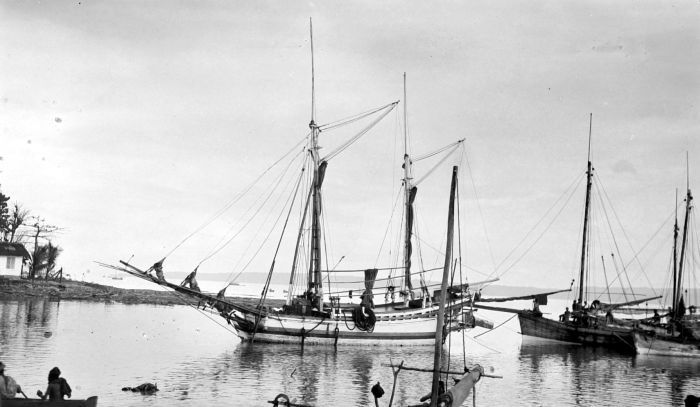
Palari with pinisi rig, West Sulawesi, 1923–1925.

A palari was a type of Indonesian sailing vessel originating in South Sulawesi, now largely superseded by mechanised vessels. Palaris were primarily used by the people of Ara and Lemo Lemo (in the Bulukumba Regency), to transport goods and people. They were rigged using the pinisi rig, which often led to them being better known as pinisi. In Singapore, palaris were known as "makassar traders".

== Etymology ==
The name is derived from the Makassarese word biseang palari. Biseang means "boat", and lari means "to run" or "running". The word pa is a suffix used in forming nouns designating persons according to their occupation or labor, similarly to the English suffix -or/-er. The meaning of palari would therefore be equivalent to "runner". This description underlines the fact that this vessel was nimbler and faster than its predecessor, the padewakang.

== Description ==
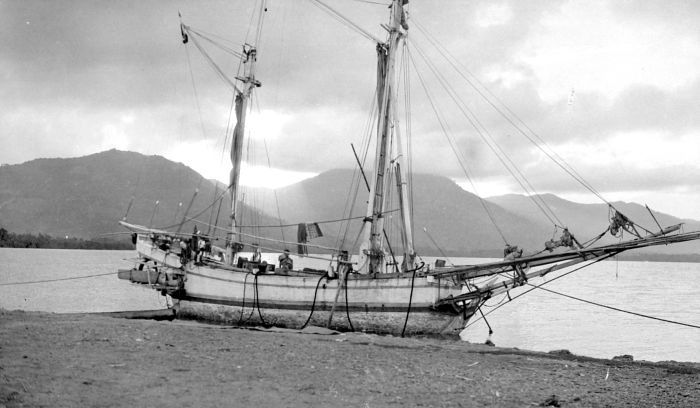
Beached palari in South Sulawesi.

A typical palari would be about 50–70 feet (15.24–21.34 m) in length overall, with a length at the waterline (lightly laden) of 34–43 feet (10.36–13.1 m). The sails were made using light canvas, while the topsails were of linen cloth. The vessel would be crewed by seven or eight men. Steering was achieved using double quarter rudders (a pair of rudders, one hung from each side of the stern quarters of the boat). Under favorable conditions, they could reach 9–10 knots (16.7–18.5 km/h) in speed. A vessel with 30 feet (9.14 m) LWL would have a capacity of nearly 400 pikul (22.7–25 tons).

During the 1920s and 1930s, the palari's crew would normally sleep in narrow bunks hung from ropes below the deck. Traditionally, the captain would have a small cabin about 2 m in length and 1 m in height, situated under the stern deck planking. Passengers could be accommodated in temporary cabins built on deck. Cooking was done using clay pots in a movable hearth about 1–2 m high. Cooking would be done by one of the crew, unless a female cook was brought aboard: occasionally the captain's wife would take this role, but generally the crew subsisted primarily on rice. Toilet facilities were located aft, overhanging the stern. Water was stored in jerrycans, drums, and pots.

The palari hull was based on an older type of bost from Sulawesi: the pajala. Pajalas were open coastal vessels usually having a tripod mast carrying a single large tanja sail. The hull was carvel-built, and like other Malay boats, it was double-ended (meaning that the boat came to a point at the bow and stern, finishing with a stem and sternpost). The pajala hull was adapted into a palari by adding more planks to increase the freeboard by about 2–3 feet (61–91 cm). An overhanging stern deck (called ambeng in Malay) was also added, and the whole boat was decked over.

== History ==
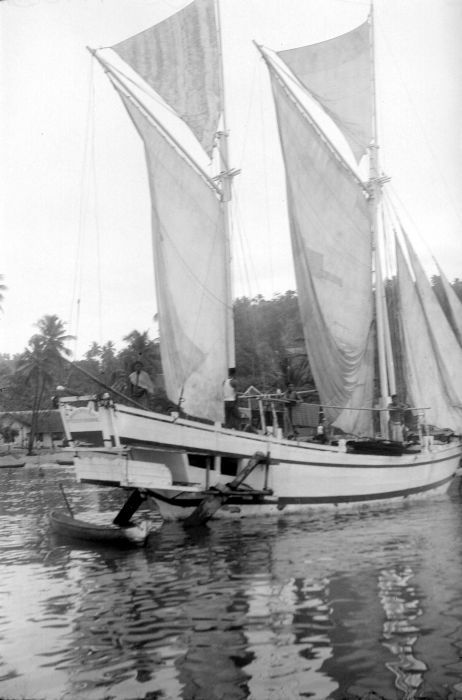
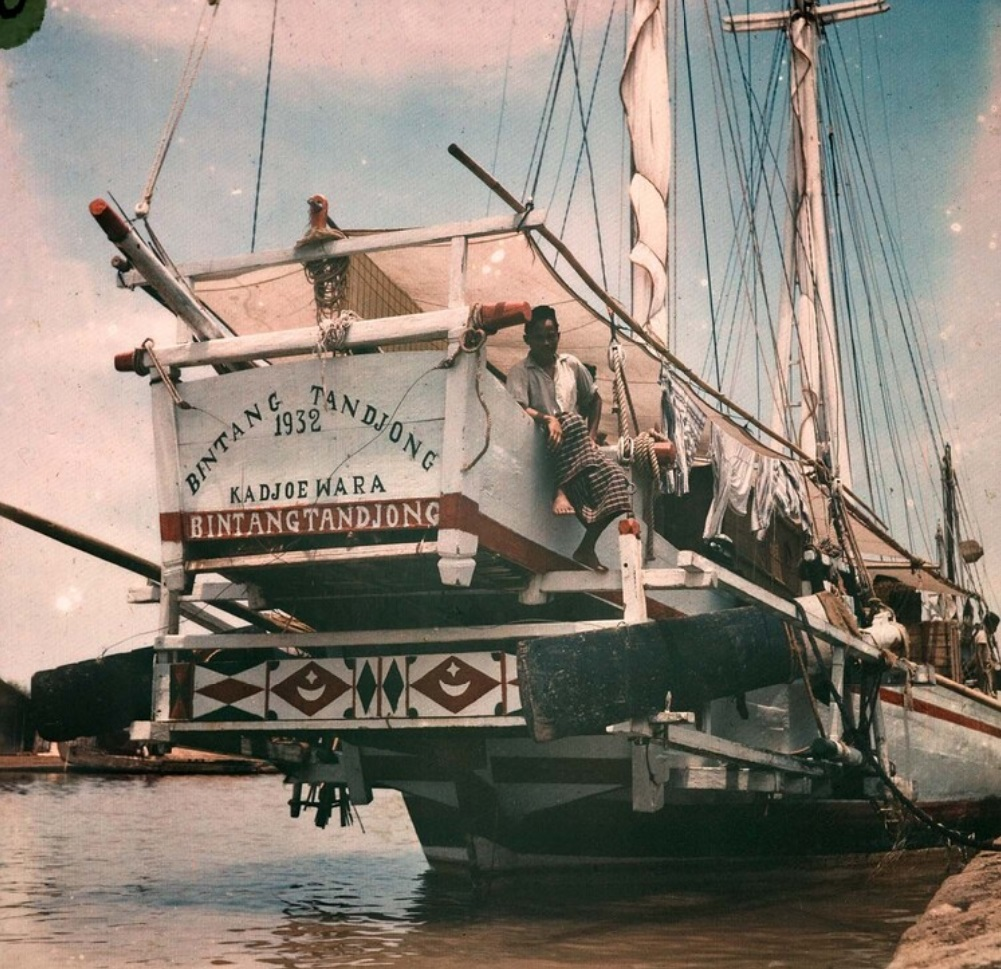
The ambeng up close.

=== Pajala to palari hull ===
In the 18th century, the Bugis people sailed a type of perahu similar to the patorani. Those craft had a pajala-type hull and were rigged using a canted triangular sail and a tripod mast, similar to a pajala. Vessels of this type were seen trepanging on beaches in northern Australia between 1800 and 1840. In 1880, a boat dubbed "Bugis prahu" seems to have been an early prototype for the palari hull. It featured a western-styled deck with a traditional (indigenous) stern. A bowsprit and jibsail was also been added, but the boat still used a tanja sail on a single tripod mast. There was no cabin at the stern.

This prototype was developed further in later vessels by adding additional planking: raising the freeboard and thereby increasing cargo capacity. A step was set into the bow and the overhanging stern deck (ambeng) was also added.

=== Rigging: from padewakang-tanja to palari-pinisi ===
At the port of Reo in the Flores island, 1927.

The first Sulawesian true pinisi (that is, a palari hull combined with a pinisi rig, rather than the tanja rig) is thought to have been a penisiq [sic] built in 1906 by shipbuilders in Ara and Lemo-Lemo for a skipper based in Bira. In addition to the two-masted type, there was also a single-masted variants called palari jengki (also known as the one-masted pinisi). The single-masted boats had a much simpler sail plan. They were rigged with a nade sail (similar to the gunter rig) in the same fashion as lambo boats, occasionally with loose-footed cutter-type headsails (lacking a pekaki, or lower spar).

Sulawesi sailors were inspired to abandon the tanja rig that they had used for many years in favour of the pinisi rig (which is more European in style) because of its ease of use. In stronger winds, the sizeable tanja sail had to be reefed by rolling it onto the boom, which was a heavy and dangerous job. By contrast, pinisi sails can be reduced section by section: lowering the topsail, then the headsail, leaving just the mainsail in use. In even stronger winds, the mainsail could be reefed by pulling it towards the mast, a much easier task than rolling it onto the boom as in the tanja rig. These techniques could be combined, so that (for example) a vessel with reefed mainsail and one or more headsails still functioning could remain under way with full steering control. There is also a difference in sailing ability between the two types of rig: a pinisi-rigged boat can sail closer to the wind and can turn more easily when beating to windward.

By the end of the 1930s, the fleet of palari-pinisi at the end of the 1930s had become the Indonesian archipelago's greatest trading fleet, competing in particular with Madurese leti-leti, and plying trading routes as far afield as Singapore. This changed following the outbreak of World War II. During the war, it was not profitable for vessels to sail further west than Surabaya and Semarang. Salemo island is a small trading centre that was home to around 100 trading pinisi. A villager from the island remembered that on the eastern shore of the island (which is about 650 m long):

"The pinisi would form an uninterrupted line, as they anchor side by side, along the shore. One may go on board a pinisi from one end; walk over the decks of the vessels and get off at the other end; so that one may move from the south to the north of the island without stepping on the soil between."

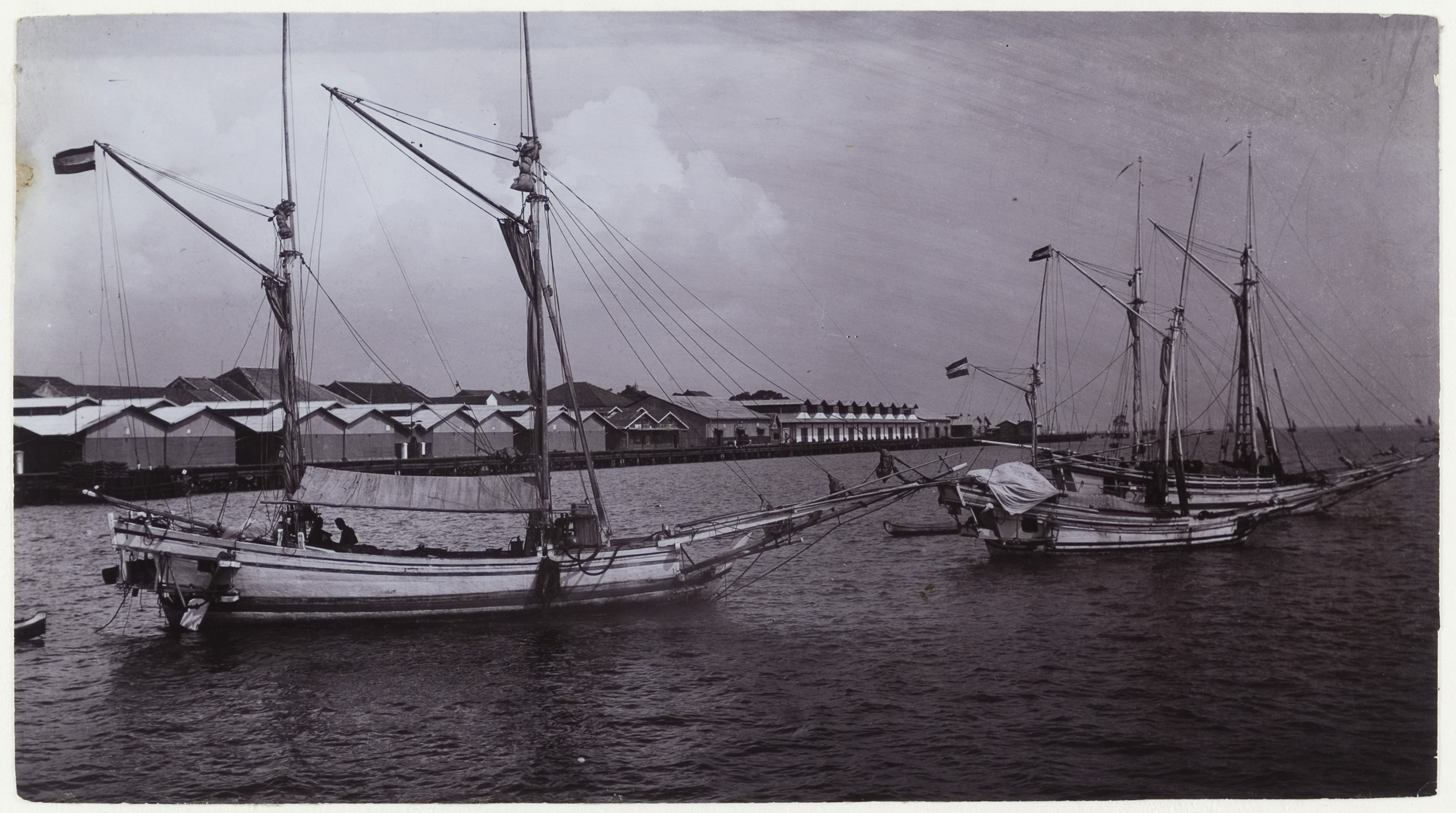
At the port of Makassar, 1925.

During World War II, the Imperial Japanese Army commandeered Biran pinisi to transport materiel and other supplies. In consequence, many vessels were targeted and sunk by Allied planes and warships. The situation was the same on Salemo Island. Towards the end of the Japanese occupation, in late 1945, Salemo Island was targeted by Allied air strikes. Many of the pinisi based there were destroyed. The surviving pinisi owners fled to Jakarta or Surabaya with their vessels. After World War II, during the Indonesian National Revolution, many Biran vessels were engaged in smuggling weapons from Singapore to Java for the new Indonesian armed forces. When peace was restored, sailing ships were the only means of transport that could function without needing expensive spare parts to be imported from abroad, so Biran trading revived rapidly. However, the weak economy meant that new merchants could only afford to build the lambo, which was smaller in size than the pinisi. Nevertheless, in the 1950s, Biran traders started to order vessels of 100 tons capacity or more. By contrast, before 1940, the biggest ships could load only about 40 tons. From 1960 onwards, the larger ships were increasingly used to transport cargoes consigned by Chinese and Indonesian traders rather than trading East Indonesian commodities on their own account. In the period between 1960 and 1970, the palari-pinisi became the world's largest sailboat trading fleet, numbering 800–1000 units. The main competition was still with the leti-leti, of which there were a similar number. Starting in the 1970s, the traditional sailing vessels started to be motorized. It was found that the traditional palari hull was effectively incapable of accommodating engines, unlike the hull of the lambo. A new type of vessel, the lambo-pinisi, took over the role of palari-pinisi, and then evolved into the PLM (Perahu Layar Motor — motorized sailboat), which can load up to 300 tons.

== See also ==
- Padewakang
- Patorani
- Lis alis
- Janggolan
