= Janggolan =

Two different type of boats from Indonesia

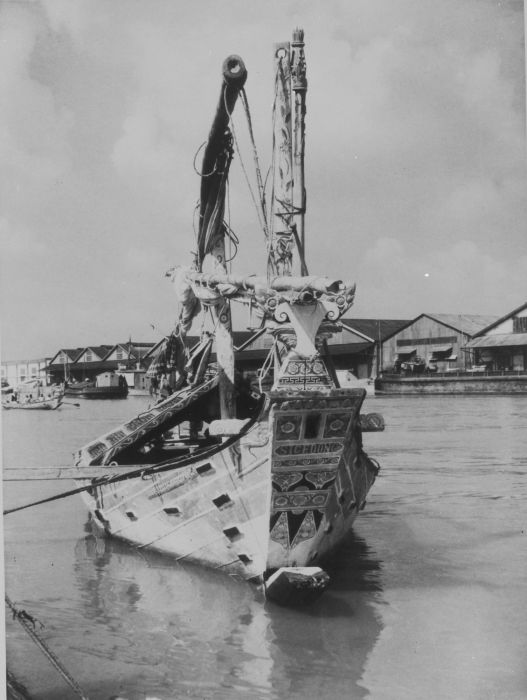
Madurese janggolan in the port of Surabaya. Note the bifid end of the keel, also called "jaw", and the flat decorated face.

Janggolan refers to two different type of perahu from Indonesia. One is from Madura, and the other from Bali. The Madurese janggolan is a type of indigenously constructed boat, meanwhile Balinese janggolan is an indigenous boat with western-styled hull construction.

== Madurese janggolan ==
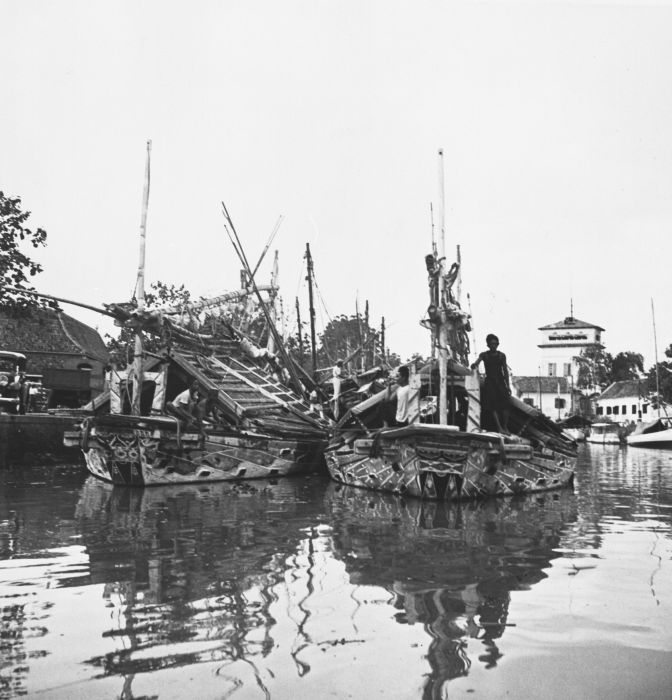
Rear view of janggolan in Pasar Ikan, Batavia.

Janggolan in Madura comes from the western half of the south coast of Madura, from Kamal to Sampang. It is the largest from the family of boats with double stempost, like lis-alis. They can be found plying to Singapore in the past, being called "old-style golekkan".

=== Etymology ===
The word janggolan means transportation. It is also called as parao janggol (meaning "transport perahu") by the Madurese. Like the alisalis, janggolan were regarded as "female" (parao bini — female boat), and ornamental motif used were connected with the feminine.

=== Description ===
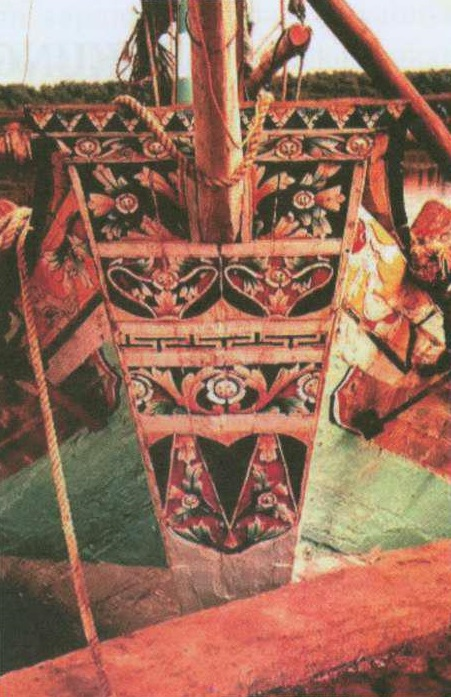
Decorated face of a janggolan.

Madurese janggolan can be identified by flat decorated face between the double stempost in the boat and from the distance it can be identified by 2 supporting poles above the stern that's supported by temporary bamboo rod. Also, janggolan were not painted white like the leti leti. In the sea, janggolan has the same rig as golekan (lete rig), but the shape is bigger. Kroman is the same as janggolan, also with deckhouse, 2 triangular sails with the same rig, but usually with narrower bow with an elegant, high ascending frame and low "jawline". Kroman in the 19th century also had outrigger, and it might be that all the boats from the family of lis-alis are descendants of boats that had outriggers. Horizontal mast (tenjoran) is still used in the direction of the wind because it is a part of the rigging.

Madurese janggolan is "large lis-alis", some of them having large solid mast. They are Madura's heaviest cargo boat. The carrying capacity is between 65 and 120 tons. The rudder post itself can be 3 meter long with 25x40 cm in thickness, with vertical pillar taller than human. Kroman weighing 100–200 ton constructed without ribs or floor because it's not possible in the past, but now the janggolan has a large number of heavy ribs placed close together like on the hull of western boats, with tying pole and covered them to keep the cargo from water. The wood carving pattern on the face of the boat comes from various sources, including the Dutch royal emblem. They are also very persistent and faithful in using it, a janggolan in 1978 is using the same pattern from an illustration of more than 60 years before.

=== Role ===
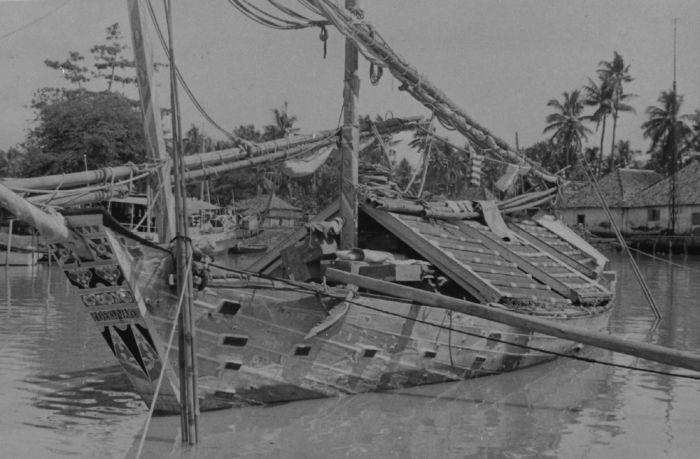
Madurese janggolan in Pasar Ikan, Batavia. Note the flat decorated face and the tenjoran.

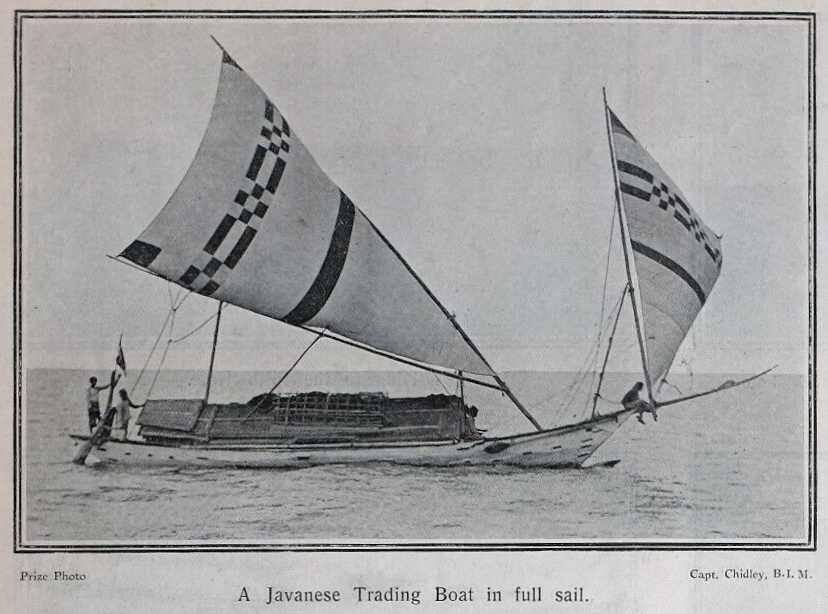
Javanese janggolan with lete sail (a variant of crab claw sail), goosewinged (receiving wind from the stern).

In the 19th century, janggolan is the main mean of transportation and is commonly used to transport egg of milkfish (Chanos chanos) caught near offshore and sold to fish farm owners along the coast of north Java. Janggolan had been involved in the carrying of timber from Kalimantan from the late 1960s, combining this with the transport of salt to Jakarta and other places in the western portion of the archipelago since early 20th century, and specializing in the transport of baulk timber or squared logs to ports in Java.

There are indications that janggolan will be replaced entirely by leti-leti and no more janggolan will be constructed. The surviving ones carried cargo to small river estuary and passing through muddy shallow waters in Madura strait, where the frame is made better suited, protecting them from difficult conditions and its rig enable them to maneuver along the small river with the help of pole. In the sea, heavy laden janggolan can sail steadily in water, with the aft of the boat pulled down by its body shape, creating little waves or small ripples under the bow of the boat.

=== Gallery ===
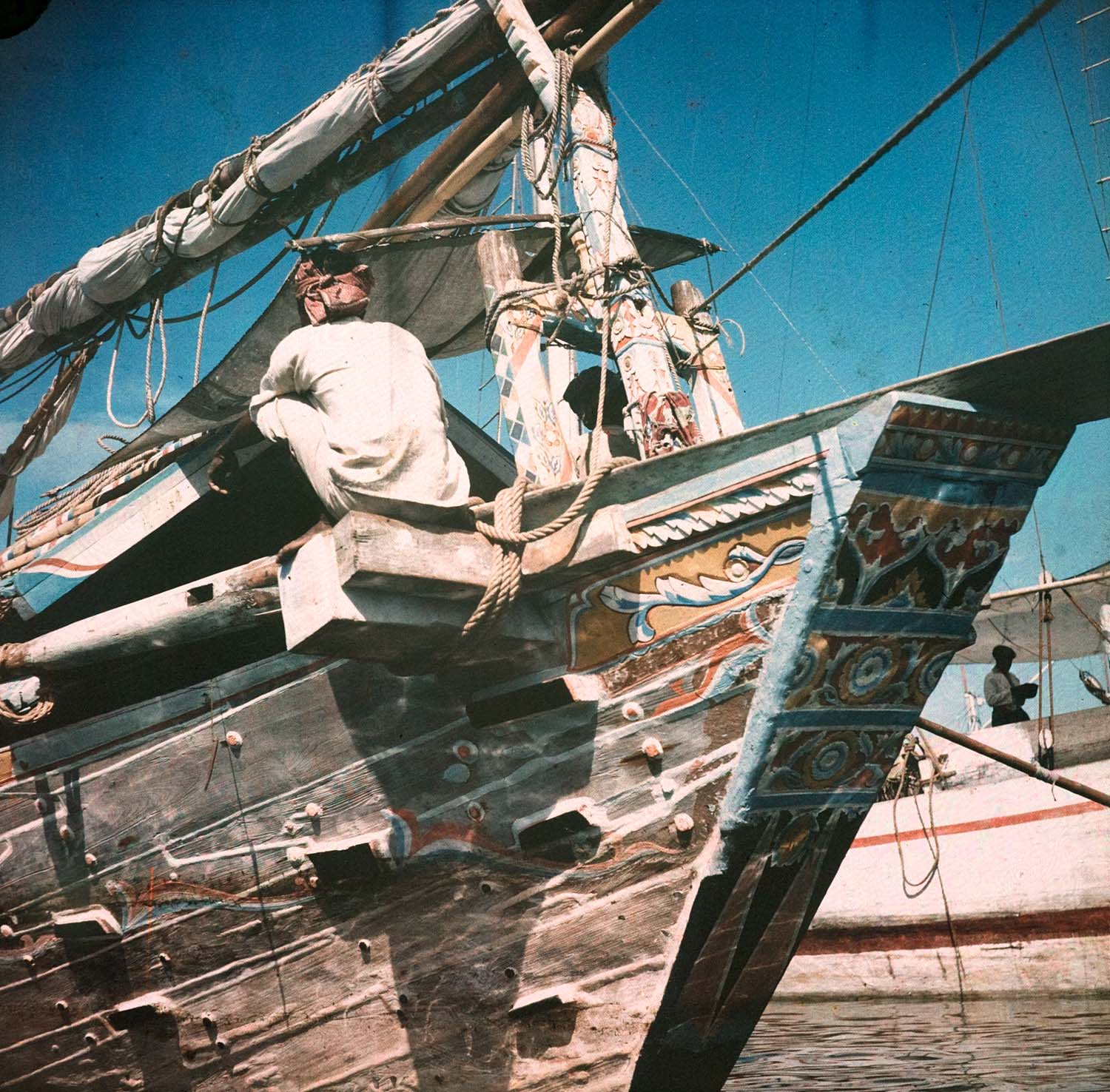
Stern of a janggolan.

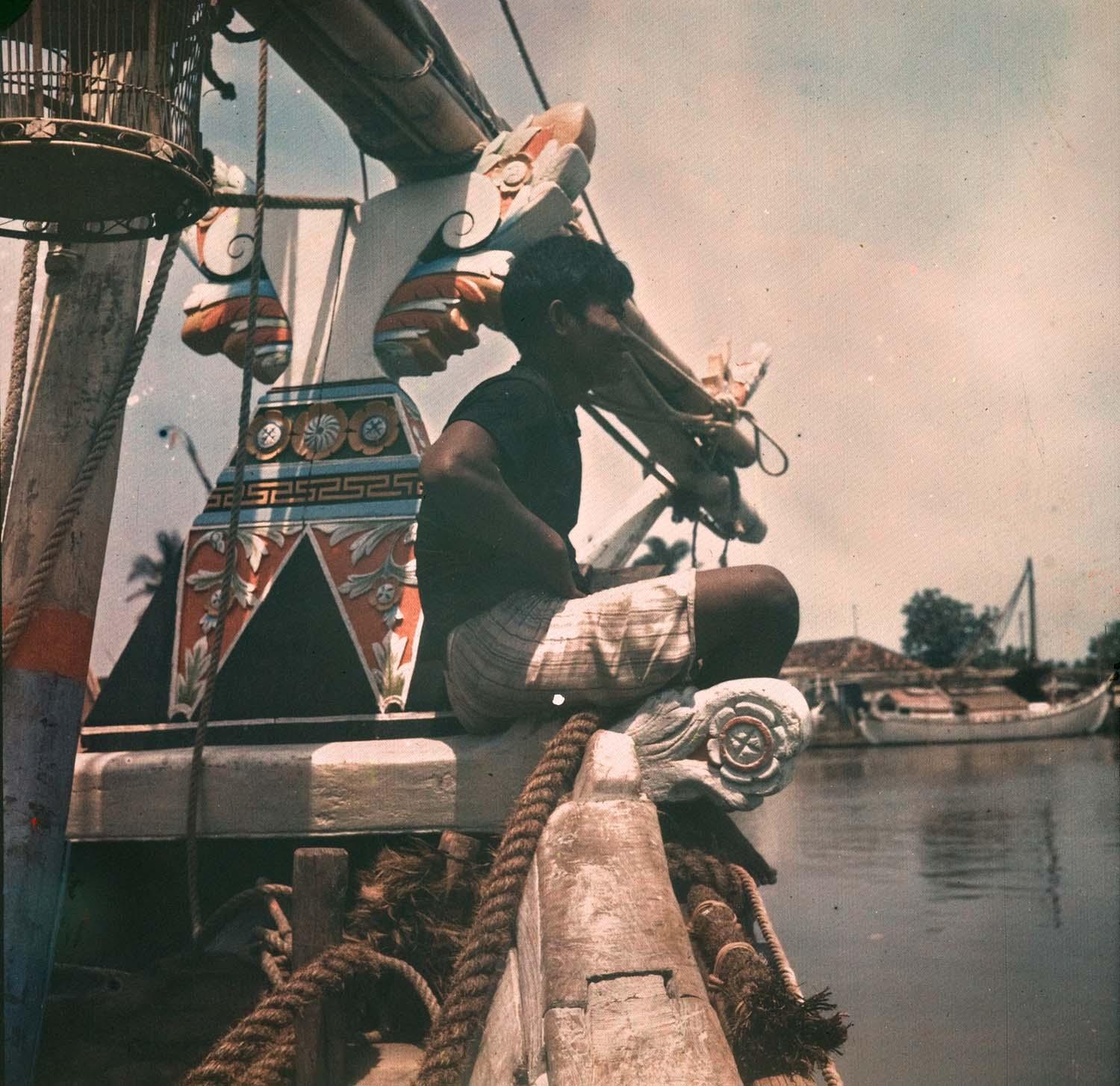
At the bow deck.

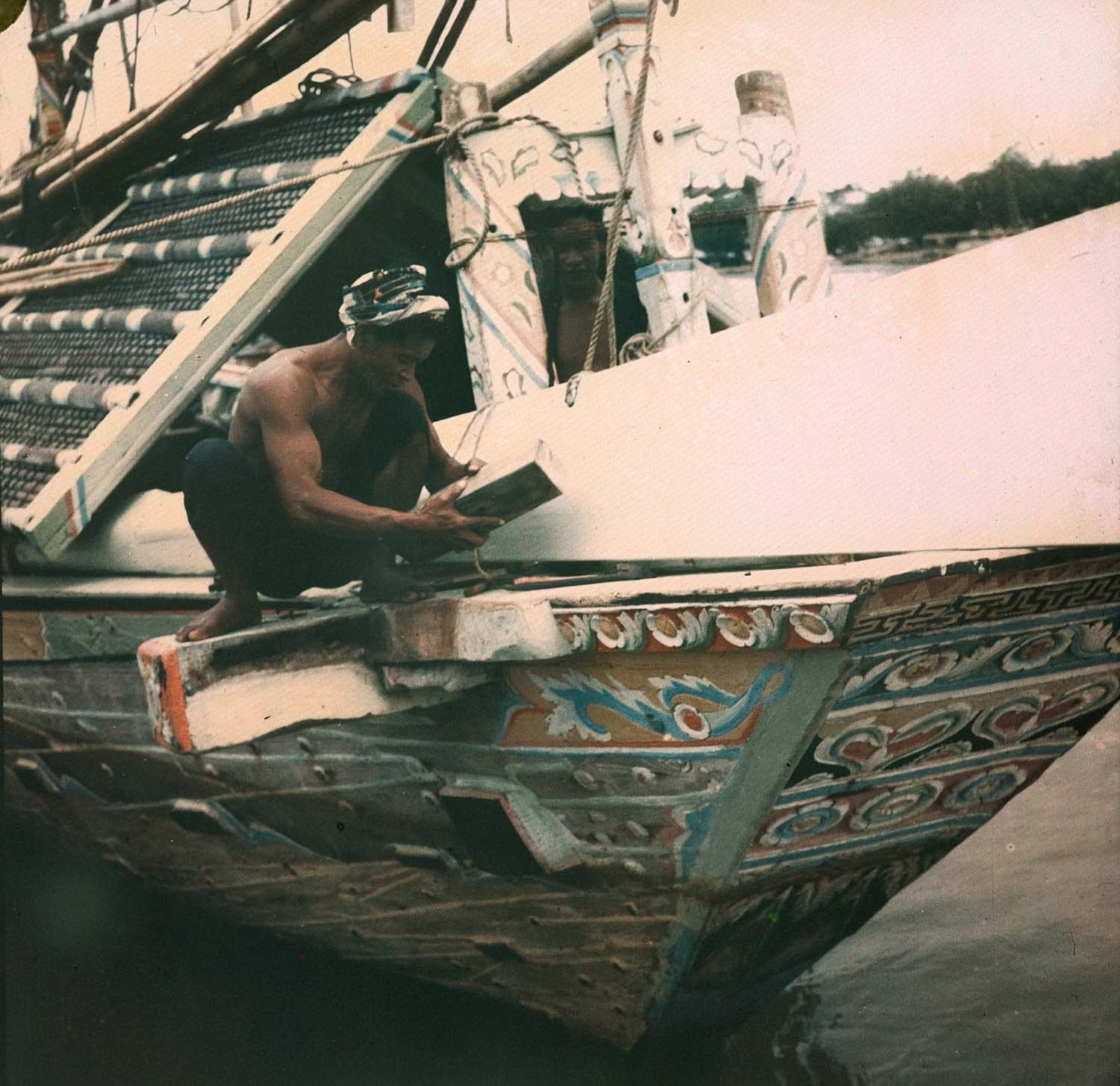
Large rudder at the stern.

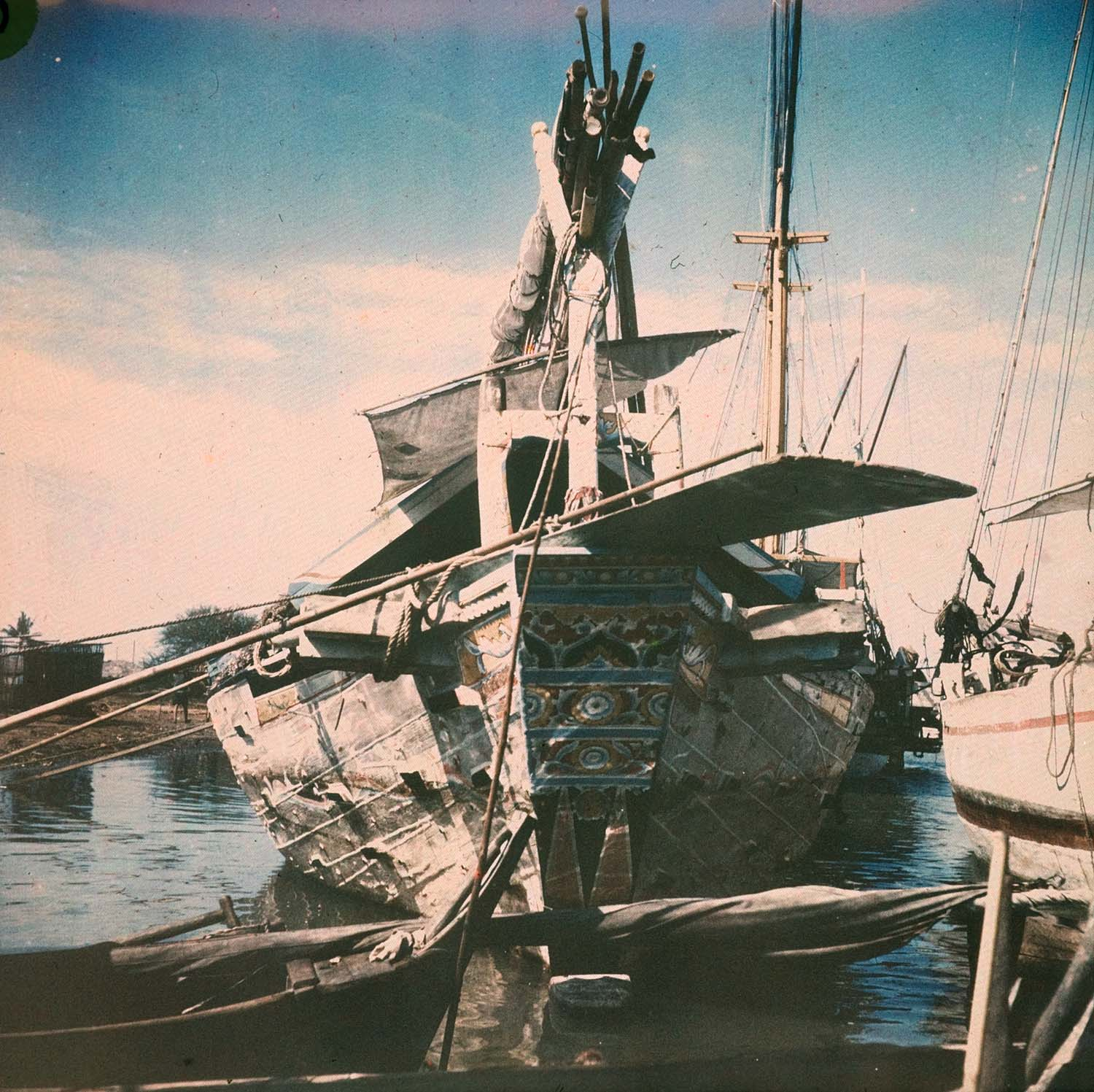
The stern face.

== Balinese janggolan ==
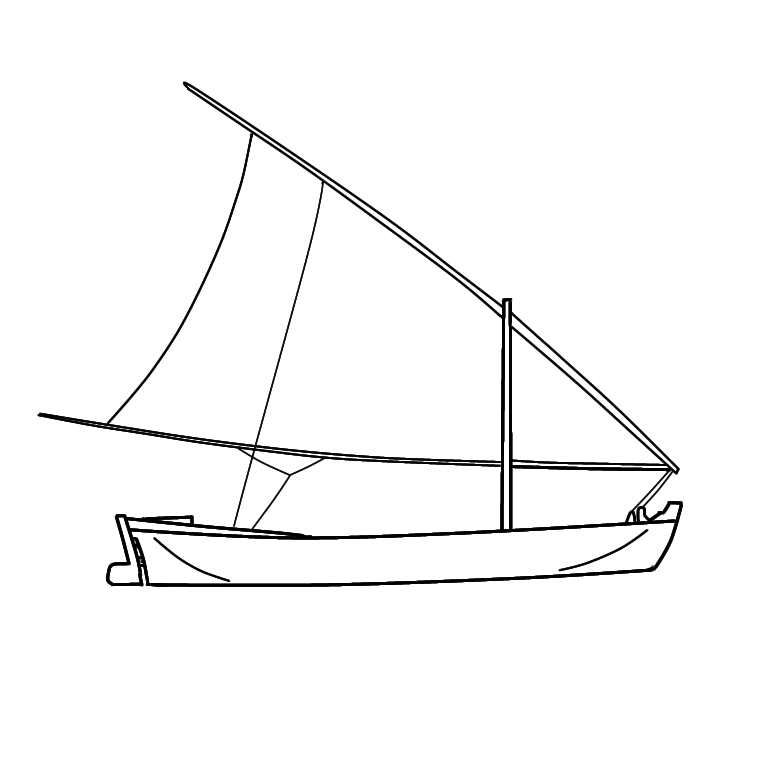
A 2D drawing of a Balinese janggolan photographed by Adrian Horridge.

Balinese janggolan refers to small type of boat with western influence used in Bali, built using sekoci hull. The word sekoci likely comes from Dutch word schuitje (small boat). In the 19th century a sekoci means a small perahu with western-style construction, usually for the Dutch, and many of the type exported from Makassar to other islands.

=== Description ===
It is used as ferry boat, with sekoci hull, central rudder, and small single sail placed high in a mast. The stempost makes a 70 degrees angle against the straight keel. The planks were bent by heating using low temperature fire. The bow and stern is pointed, almost similar to each other, but a flat platform was placed at the stern above 2 or 3 flat poles. This is where the helmsman stood, with a pole in hand, one foot pressing the rudder, holding the sail. The hull is long, thin, and almost rounded at the middle of the boat. There are ribs and seating at the edge of the boat, a deck with two levels. A Balinese janggolan observed by Adrian Horridge is 11 m long, 2.75 m wide, with midhull draft of 76 cm. The planking is 2.5 cm thick, the ribs are 7.5x12.5 cm in cross section, the mast is 4.3 m high. The height of stempost and sternpost is 1.2 m.

== See also ==
Other Madurese vessels:

- Leti leti
- Lis-alis
- Golekan

Other perahu from Nusantara:

- Lambo
- Mayang (boat)
- Pencalang
