= Wing and wing =

Method of Sailing

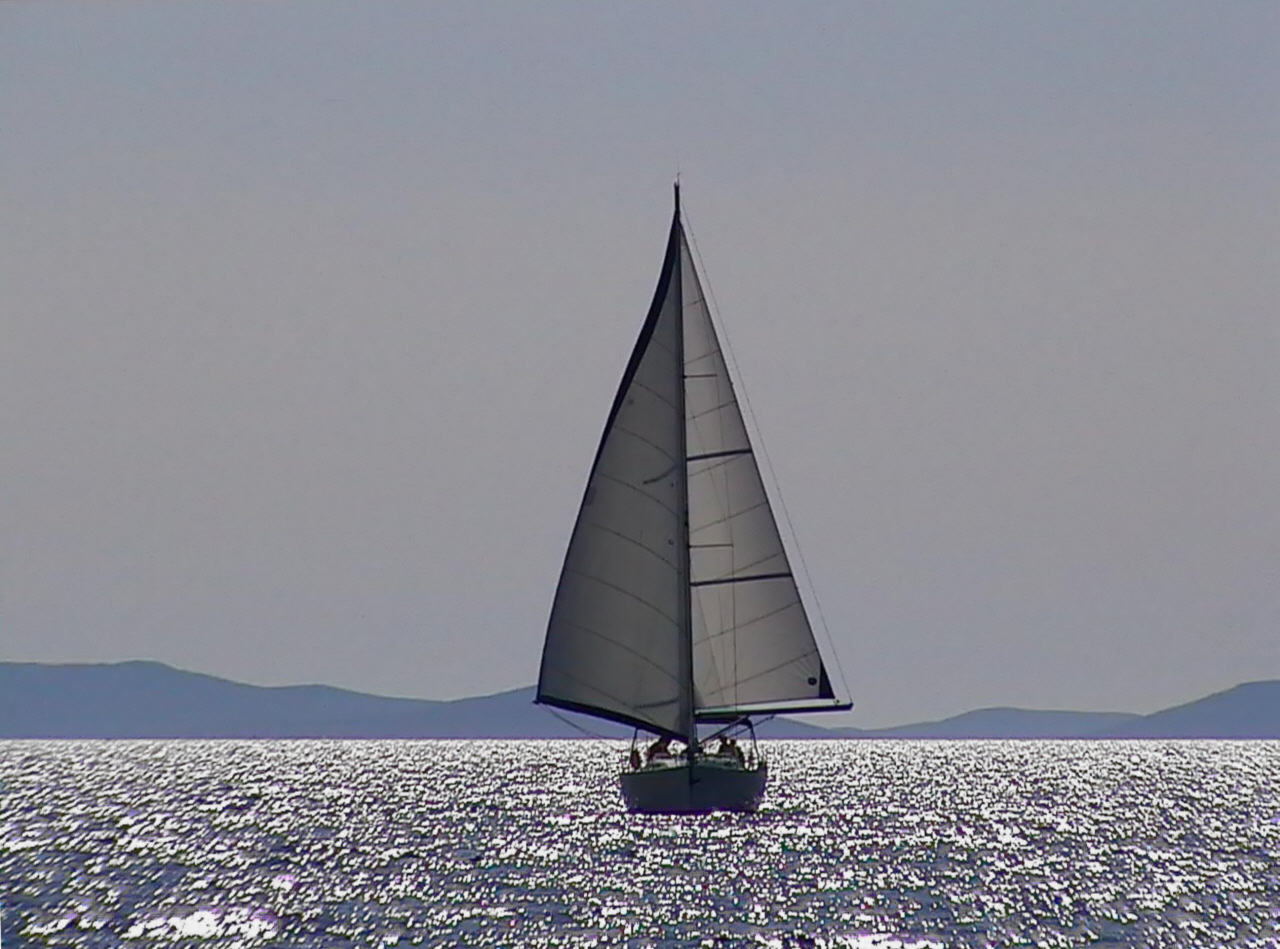
Goosewinged sailing

Wing and wing, Wing on wing, Goosewinging or Goosewinged, is a term used to define, in a fore-and-aft-rigged sailboat, a way to sail directly downwind.

== Description ==
Wing on a wing sailing

Goosewing sailing requires the use of two sails, a foresail and a mainsail. It is used when sailing directly to leeward or very close to leeward. The mainsail and the foresail are extended outwards on opposite sides of the boat, approximating a 180º angle, to maximize the area of sail exposed to the wind. The jib is held out by the clew with a whisker pole to maximize the amount of captured wind, without being covered by the mainsail. The helmsman has to watch the wind carefully to avoid an involuntary "jibe". To secure the sails against an unplanned jibe, a "preventer" may be used; This is a mechanical device that is led forward from the boom and secured so as to prevent the boom from swinging across the boat if the sail is temporarily backwinded. The further forward the boom can be positioned, the lower the risk of unintended jibe.

The position of the boom can be tactically decisive when racing or cruising since it determines which tack the vessel is on and thus which vessel should give way for the purposes of collision avoidance. If possible, the main boom should be left on the port side — otherwise there would be the possibility of having to give priority to other sailing ships, not only to those sailing closer to the wind, but just for the fact of having the boom on the port side.

== Alternatives ==
It may be possible to sail a broad reach, with occasional intentional jibes, which relieves the helmsman significantly, especially in rough seas, and can be faster because of better aerodynamics. Another alternative is to use a gennaker or a spinnaker for downwind courses.

== Running vs. close-hauled sailing ==
When sailing with the wind or running before the wind, the sails generate power primarily through drag (like a parachute) with the true wind directly from behind the sailing craft. A sailing craft propelled dead downwind cannot attain a speed faster than the true wind.

However, higher-performance sailing craft achieve a higher velocity made good downwind, by sailing on whatever broad reach is most efficient on that particular craft, and jibing as needed. The longer course is offset by the faster speed. For instance, if a vessel sails alternately in the directions 45° from the downwind direction, it will sail √2 (≈1.41) times farther than it would if it sailed dead downwind — but as long as it can sail faster than 1.4 times the true wind velocity, the indirect route will let it travel faster.

Craft running downwind increase power from the sails by increasing the total area presented to the following wind, sometimes by putting out specialized sails for that purpose, such as a spinnaker on a fore-and-aft rigged vessel, making obsolete the described goosewinging technique with the jib to windward (opposite to the main sail). In light winds, certain square-rigged vessels may set studding sails, a type of sail used to extend the central square sails outwards from the yardarms, to create a larger sail area.

== Gallery ==
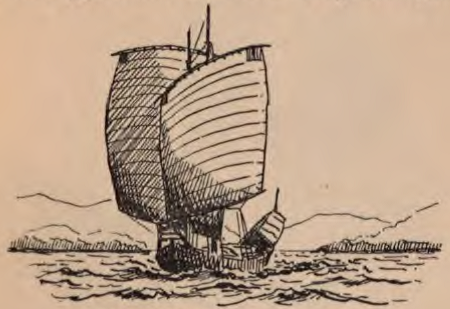
Malay Penjajap goosewinged (lug sails)

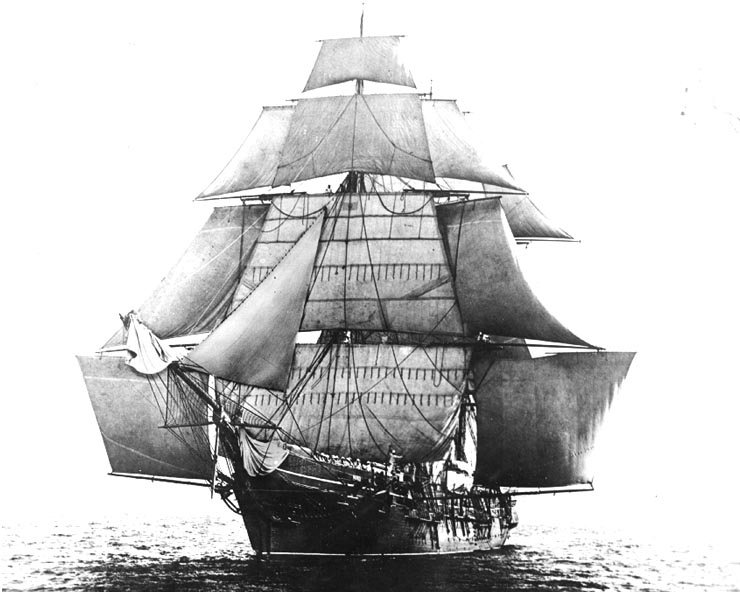
Studding sails

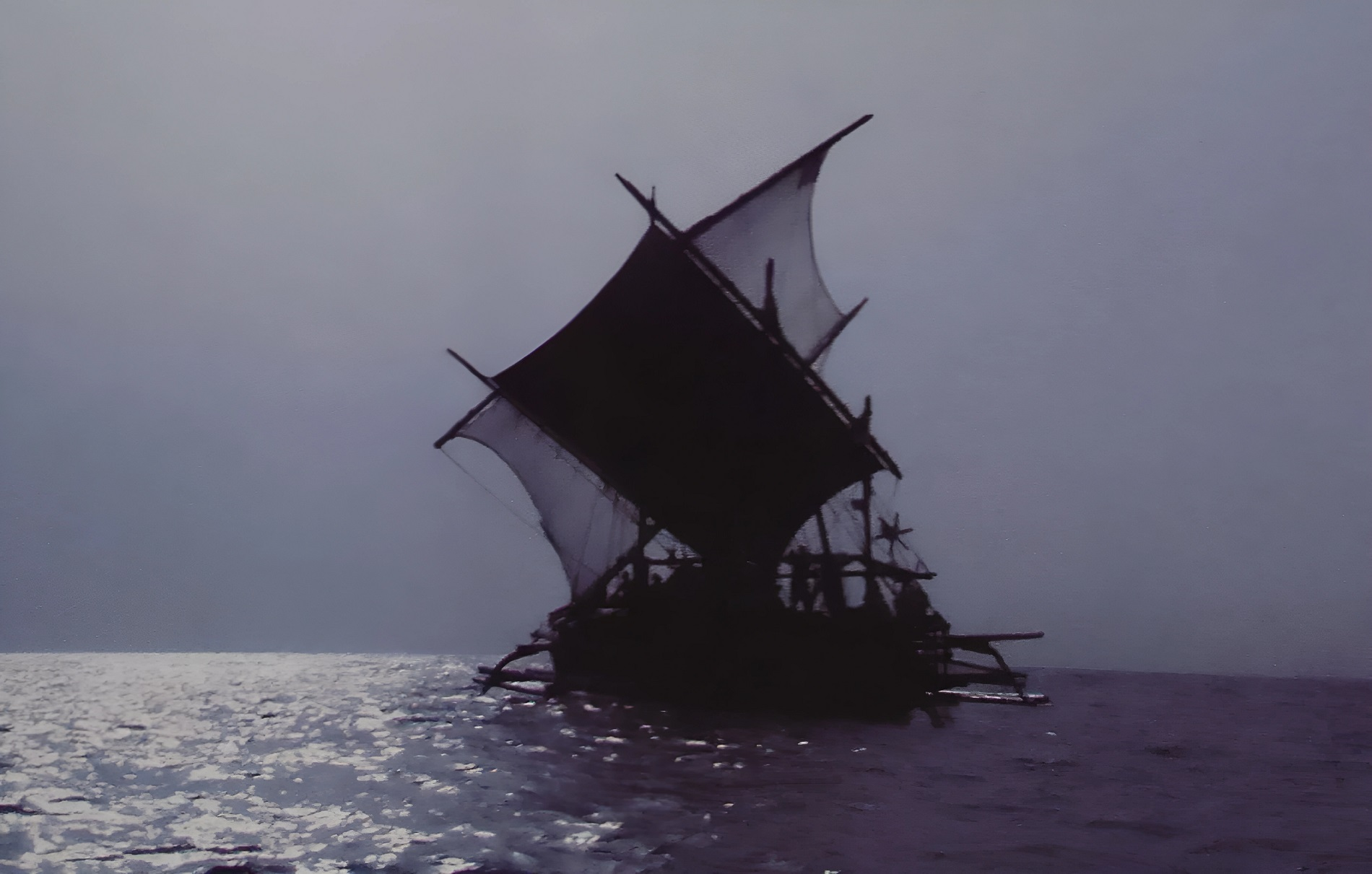
Javanese Borobudur ship with tanja sails running before the wind (receiving wind from aft)

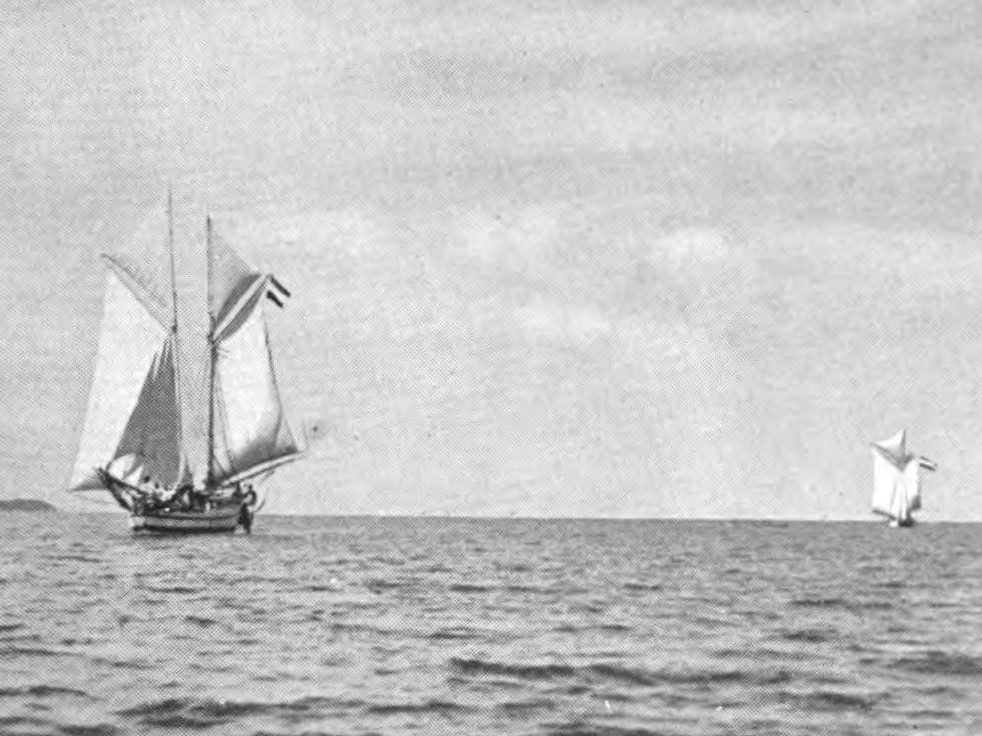
Palaris with pinisi sail

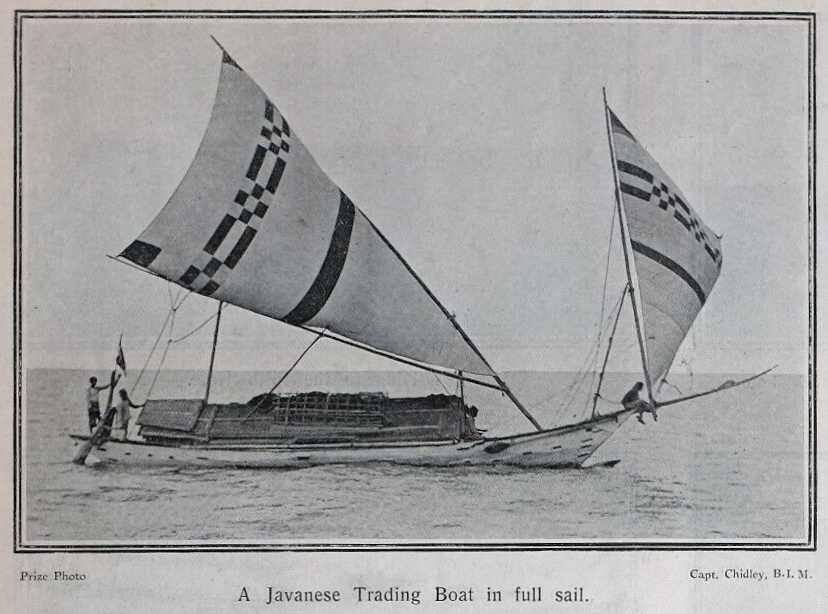
Javanese janggolan with lete sail (a variant of crab claw sail).

== Bibliography ==
- Seemannschaft. Handbuch für den Yachtsport 28 Edition, Delius_Klasing_Verlag, Bielefeld 2013, ISBN 978-3-7688-0523-0. Pages 206, 653
- Rousmaniere, John, The Annapolis Book of Seamanship, Simon & Schuster, 1999
- Chapman Book of Piloting (various contributors), Hearst Corporation, 1999
- Herreshoff, Halsey (consulting editor), The Sailor’s Handbook, Little Brown and Company, 1983
- Seidman, David, The Complete Sailor, International Marine, 1995
- Jobson, Gary, Sailing Fundamentals, Simon & Schuster, 1987
