= Lis-alis =

Type of traditional vessel from Madura

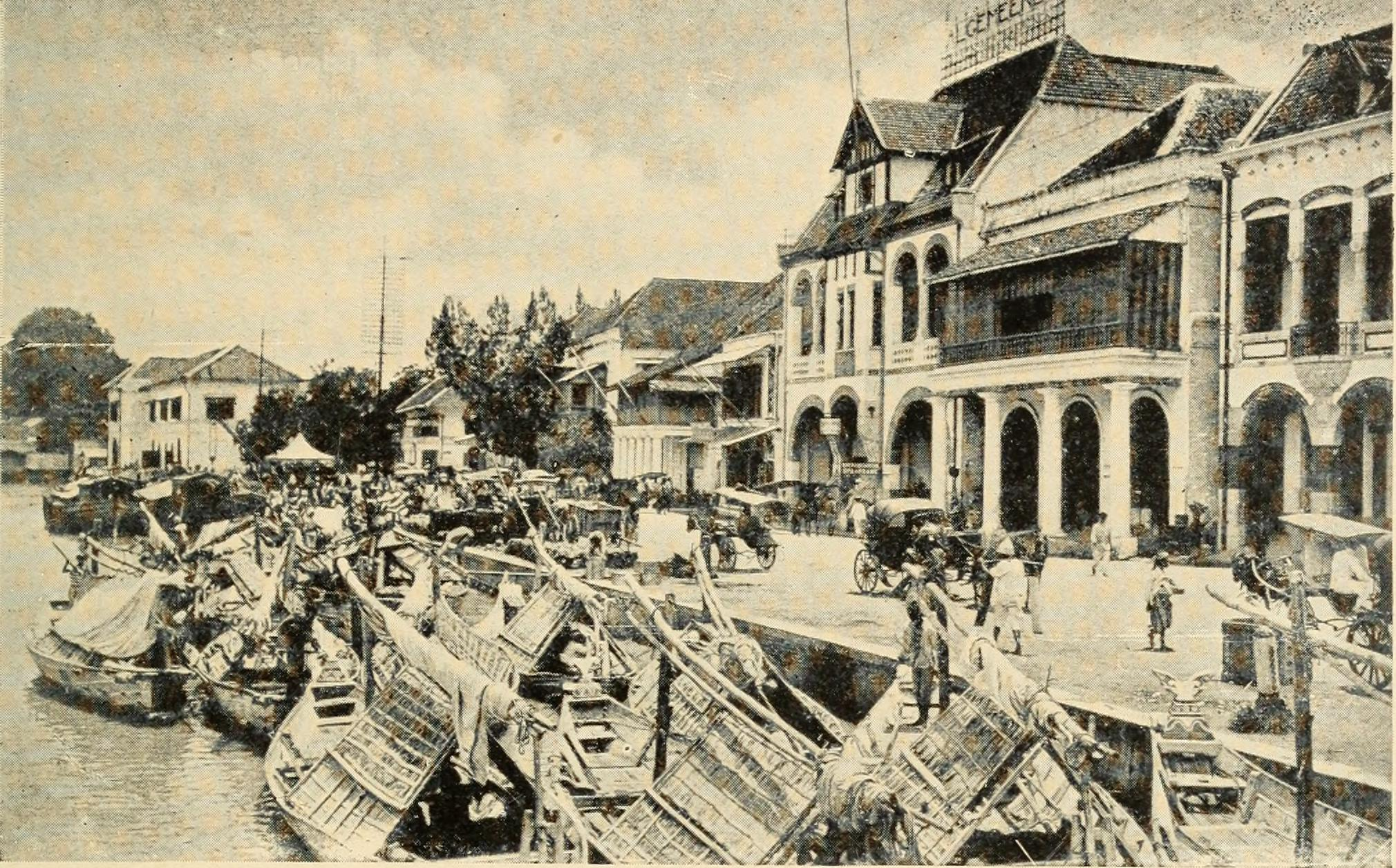
Lis-alis with lowered sails, in Surabaya.

Lis-alis is a type of traditional boat of Madura, Indonesia. Lis-alis usually present in canals that provide salt evaporation service in southern part of Madura and around Surabaya. Until the present, lis-alis remained overwhelmingly popular as a fishing craft in Bangkalan and Sukolilo, while a larger version, the kroman, has been used in this area for at least a century for inshore transport work.

== Etymology ==
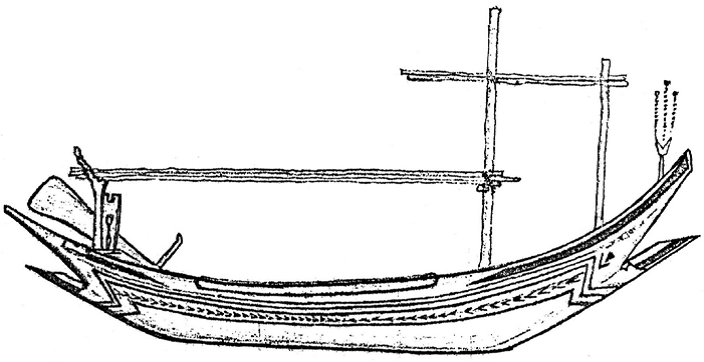
Small lis alis without roofing.

It is also known as alisalis or alis alis. The name come from Indonesian word alis which means "eyebrows". This may refer to an ornamental motif which does resemble a pair of eyebrows, often applied to the top of the bow. Eyebrows are an important aspect of feminine beauty in traditional Indonesian culture, and these boats strongly associated with the feminine — on the northwest coast they were commonly referred as parao bini, which means "female boat".

== Description ==
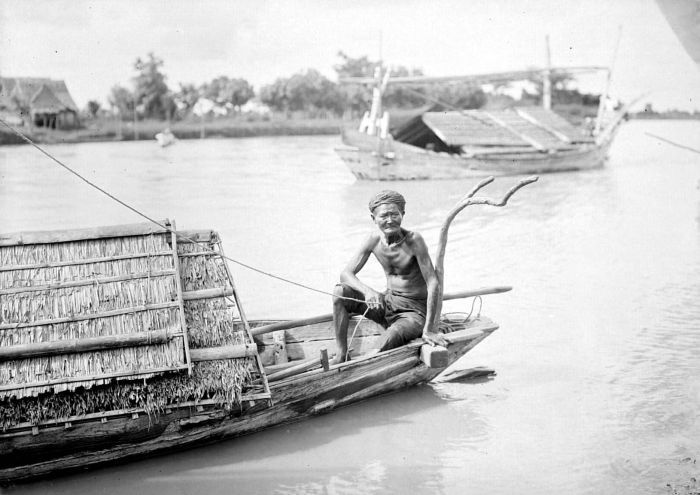
A Madurese sailor on a lis-alis, 1918. A janggolan can be seen on the background.

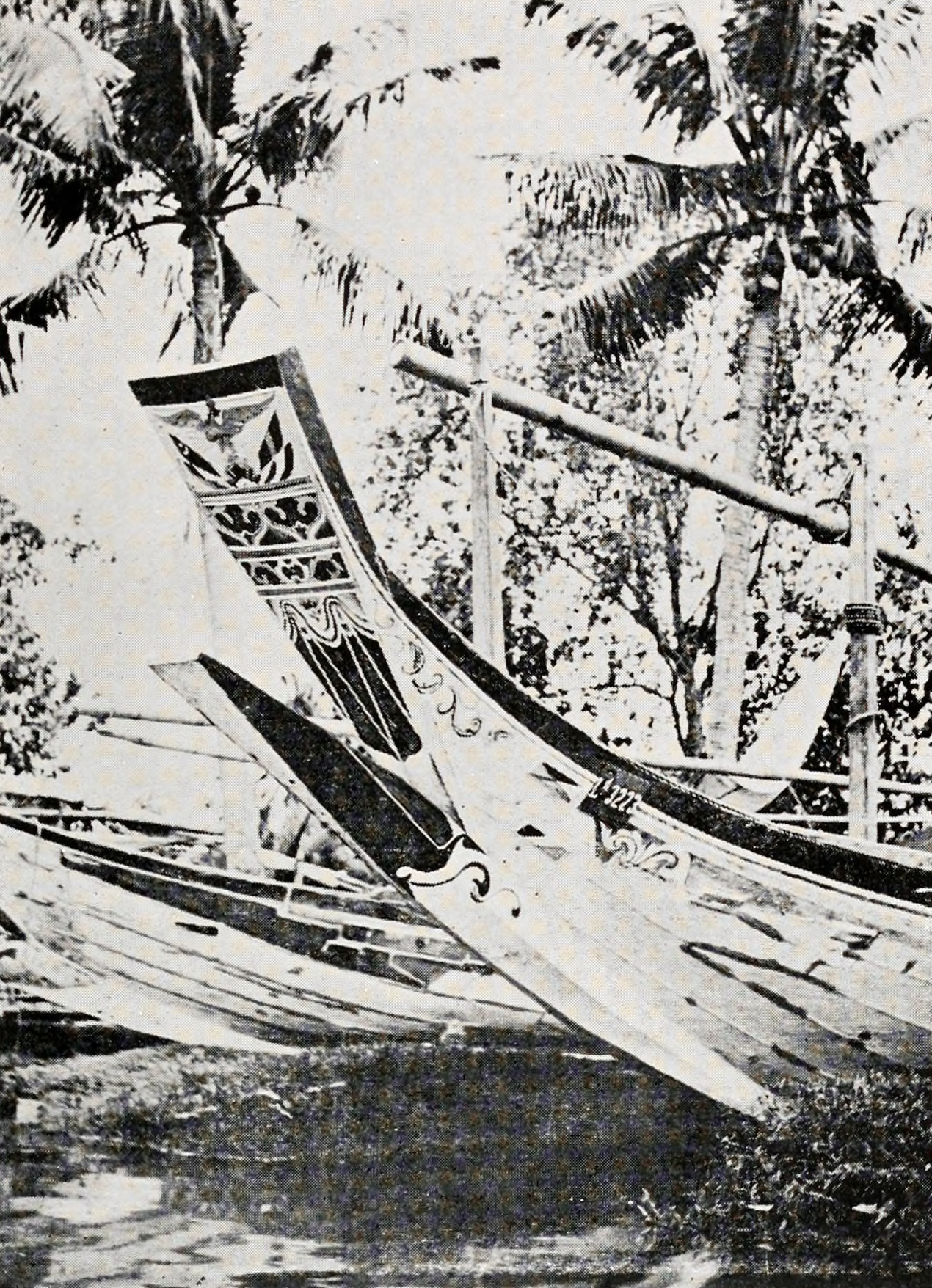
The bow detail of a small lis alis.

These boats come from varying size between 5 metres long to more than 10 metres. Usually the length is no more than 4 times the size of its mast. The ribs are never excessive on the hull. The hull was held together by the boat's stempost in its tip, with hidden wooden dowel in the corner of the planks. In the 19th century there are some models with outrigger, but now they are rarely seen. The rigging used is the traditional triangular layar lete with short mast. At the stern of the boat is a wide storage space (about as wide as the boat itself), covered from rain by bamboo cover. A row of fire pots in this storage space supports the pots for boiling water. Firewood and fish were stored in the deckhouse. These perahu were lightly built so they may be fast, for carrying fish from mayangs in the Java sea. Small lis alis is an open vessel, it doesn't have roofing. Lis alis is a bifid-ended boat (with double stem and sternpost), the lower "jaw" called antek, cantek or jabaran is an elongation of the keel that functions as a bumper.

== Role ==
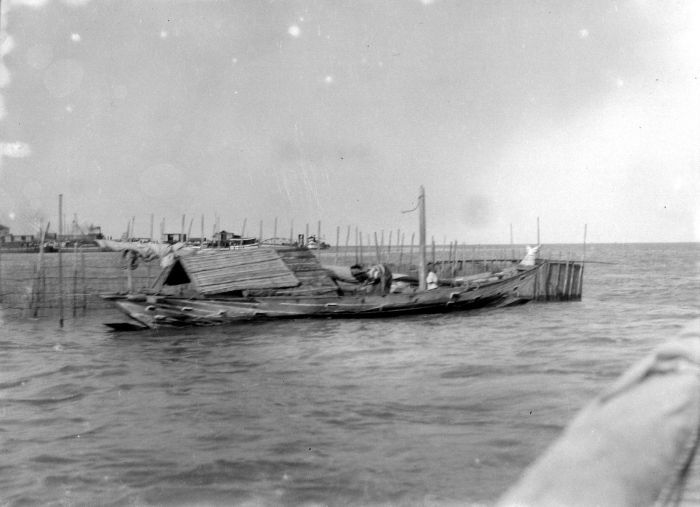
A lis-alis alongside a fish trap, 1929.

Lis-alis boats usually provide cargo carrying services in general, carrying the catch from fishing boats at the same area, and as ferry boats from Gresik to Madura. Bigger lis-alis act as favorite transport boat to carry fishes from other fisherman in sea to Surabaya. The boats is about 10–12 metres long with a deckhouse that carried processing plant for preserving the fish in the sea. They brought about 0.5 ton rough sea salt in a box. Fishes were sterilized in cooking water, then grinded and stirred in the pot until it cools down and packed in bottles to be sold as shrimp paste. The reason for this sea sterilization is that there are not enough space to dry the fish in the boat, rainstorms often occurring and ice was not used. This means a cargo of fishes won't last long, especially if there are sudden strong winds.

== See also ==
Other Madurese vessels:

- Leti leti
- Janggolan
- Golekan

Other perahu from Nusantara:

- Lambo
- Mayang (boat)
- Pencalang
