= Golekan =

Type of traditional boat from Madura, Indonesia

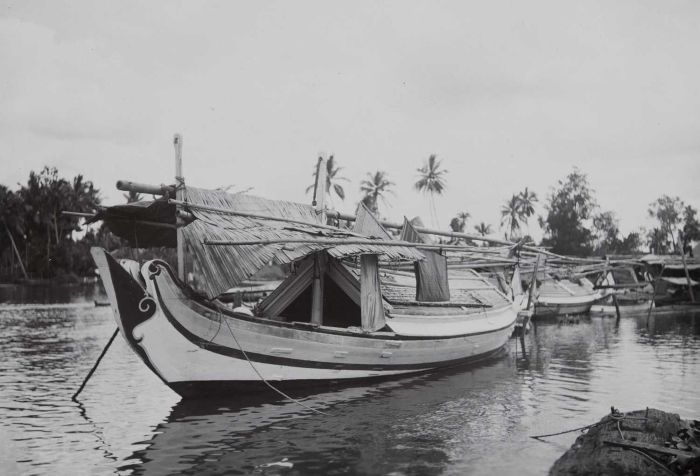
A Madurese golekan in Martapura river, Banjarmasin.

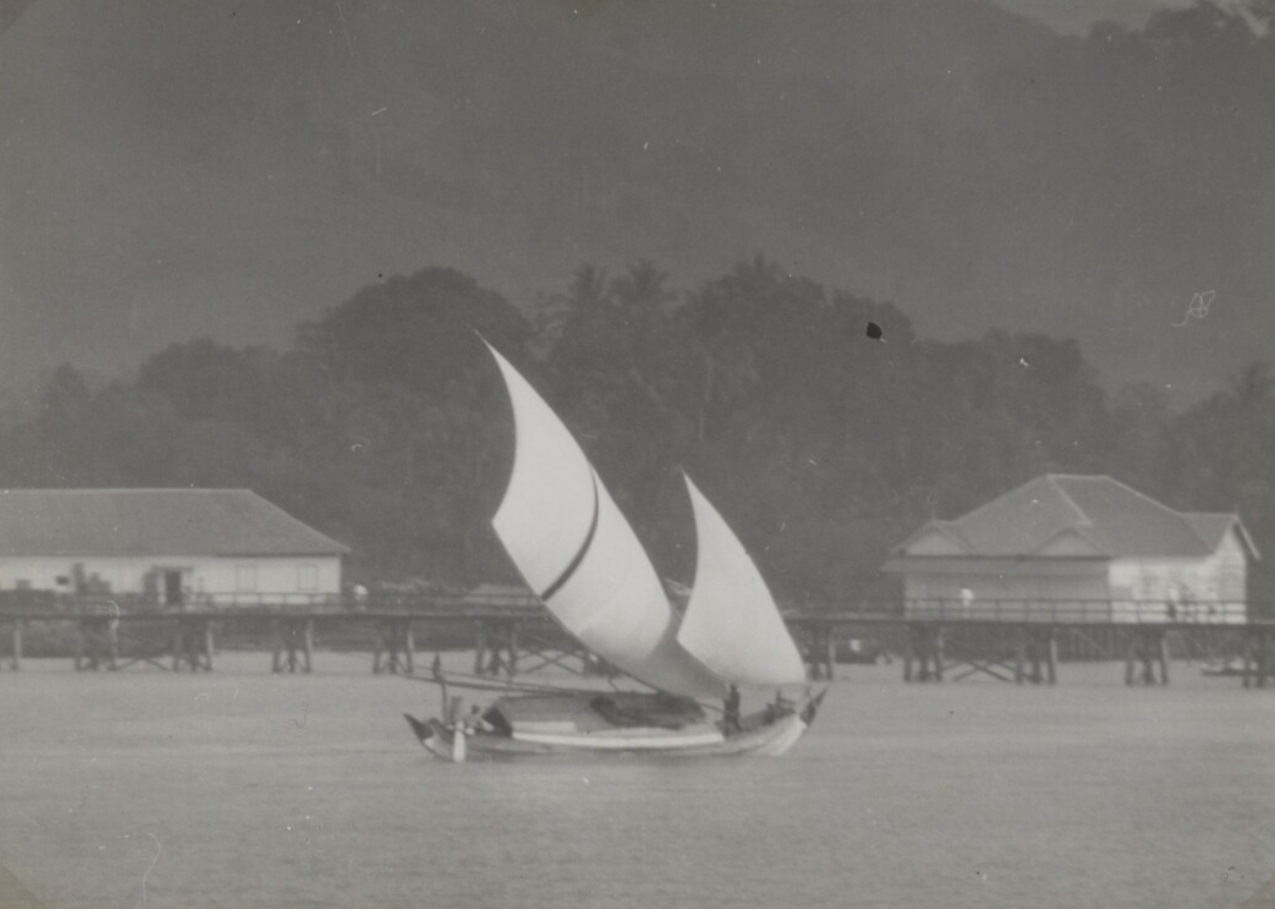
A golekan with crab claw sails, Balikpapan, 1928.

Golekan is a type of traditional boat from Madura, Indonesia. They once plied as far as Singapore, where they are referred to as Madurese traders. In the present this type of boat is only known locally, especially near Bangkalan in Western Madura and around the Kangean islands.

== Etymology ==
Dutch observer van Deventer wrote that it means "freight seeker". Gibson-Hill stated the name comes from Malay word golek, which he claimed meant crank (tender, or 'tippy') when applied to a canoe. Rather, the name derived from kolek, a Javanese word for 'boat', applied to a wide range of small craft along the north coast of Java. Thus the name golekan would meant 'a kind of kolek'. Golekan in Madurese culture were regarded as "male", being referred to as parao laki (male boat), so it has different ornamental motif from lis-alis and janggolan (parao bini — female boat). The primary symbol was the rooster, associated in Indonesian culture with combat and fearlessness.

== Description ==
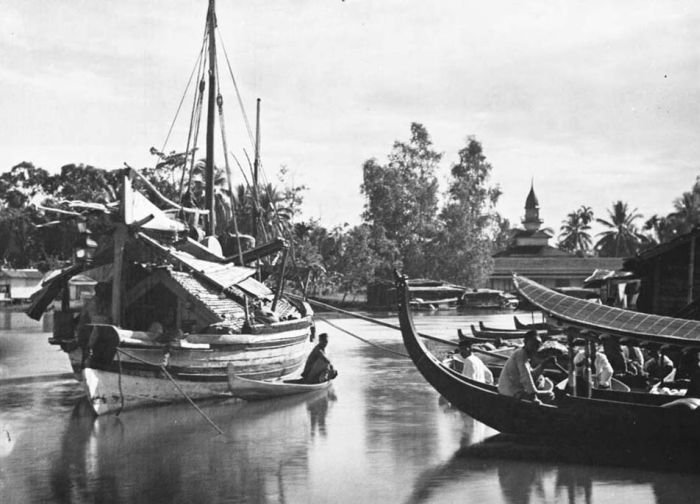
A golekan (left) in Banjarmasin.

The golekan is an indigenous perahu type, with no trace of modern influence in hull form, construction, or sailing rig. Despite the traditional nature of design, golekan appears to have been a relatively recent development. Golekan had single large and fat linggi (stempost) just like leti leti, with gulungan motifs painted black. It has deckhouse without secondary cabin at the aft of the boat. Usually had 2 sails (usually lete sail), with upper beam supported by temporary pole and mast at the direction of the wind, or at both side of the boat, with support ropes at both upper beam. The hulls were always painted white, with polychrome sheer stripe, and the upper portions of end posts, as well as the finials painted black. Medium-sized golekan used as fish transporters were about 12 metres in length with a long deckhouse. The golekan of Telaga Biru were both larger and more numerous than elsewhere, consistent in size at about 55 feet (16.8 m) length and 14 feet (4.3 m) beam. The vessels remained fully traditional until mid-1970s, when the first engine was installed. The last traditional golekan was built in 1983. Golekans reaching Singapore in 1950s has a length of 50–55 ft (15.24–16.8 m) with 12.5–13 ft (3.81–3.96 m) beam, waterline length of 41–45 ft (12.5–13.7 m). A golekan with 52 ft (15.85 m) waterline could carry 500–550 pikul (31.2–34.4 ton). They are slow, seldom exceed 8.5 knots (15.7 km/h).

== Role ==
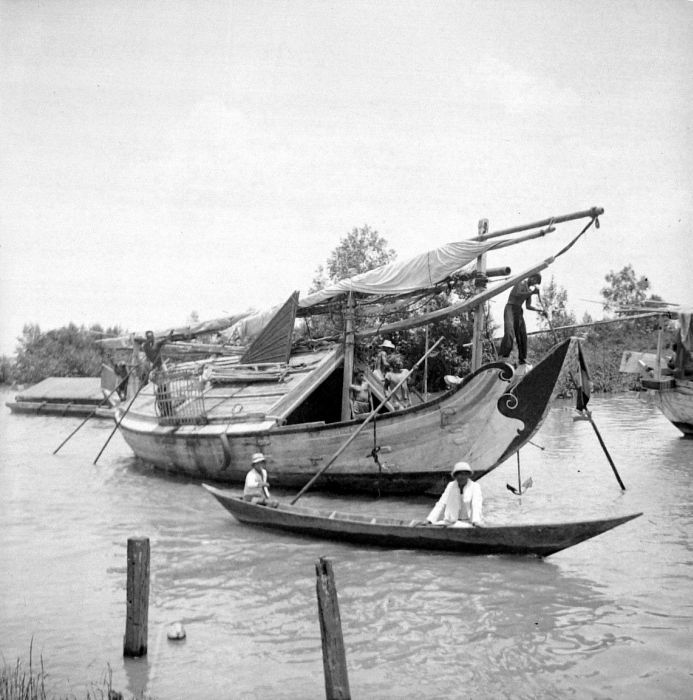
Golekan in Sambas river, West Borneo.

In the past, golekan is used as transport vessel, reaching as far as Singapore. In the early 1950s golekan from Sepulu were sailing to Singapore with mixed cargoes of palm sugar, coffee, tamarind, dried fish, and mats, along with considerable numbers of passengers from the island of Bawean. Madurese skippers would buy cattle from local market and sell them for handsome profit in Pontianak, Manggar, or Pangkal Pinang. The vessels would make 6 voyages a year, during dry season only. Largest golekan could carry up to 40 animals, tethered on a platform inside the long deckhouse. Large amounts of fodder and water needed to be carried to nourish them for the voyage. Since 1980s increasing amount of timber were brought to Telaga Biru. in 1990s this timber trade bloomed, trucks from East Java and even Bali regularly making their way to Telaga Biru to obtain the high-quality timber being landed there.

The main role for small golekan (about 20 tons in weight) is for transporting fishes from perahu mayang that remains at the sea. They had a row of boiling pots for sterilizing fishes just like lis-alis. In Bangkalan, the reason why they had 2 different type of boat is that the golekan is heavier and slower than lis-alis but they are more useful in open sea compared to lis-alis. Golekan is associated with man while lis-alis is associated with woman, and every village must have several from each kind to survive in every season, golekan is the one used when western season wind arrived.

== See also ==
Other Madurese boats:

- Lis-alis
- Janggolan
- Leti-leti

Other perahu from Nusantara:

- Lambo
- Mayang (boat)
- Patorani
