= Lambo (boat) =

Two types of traditional boats from Indonesia

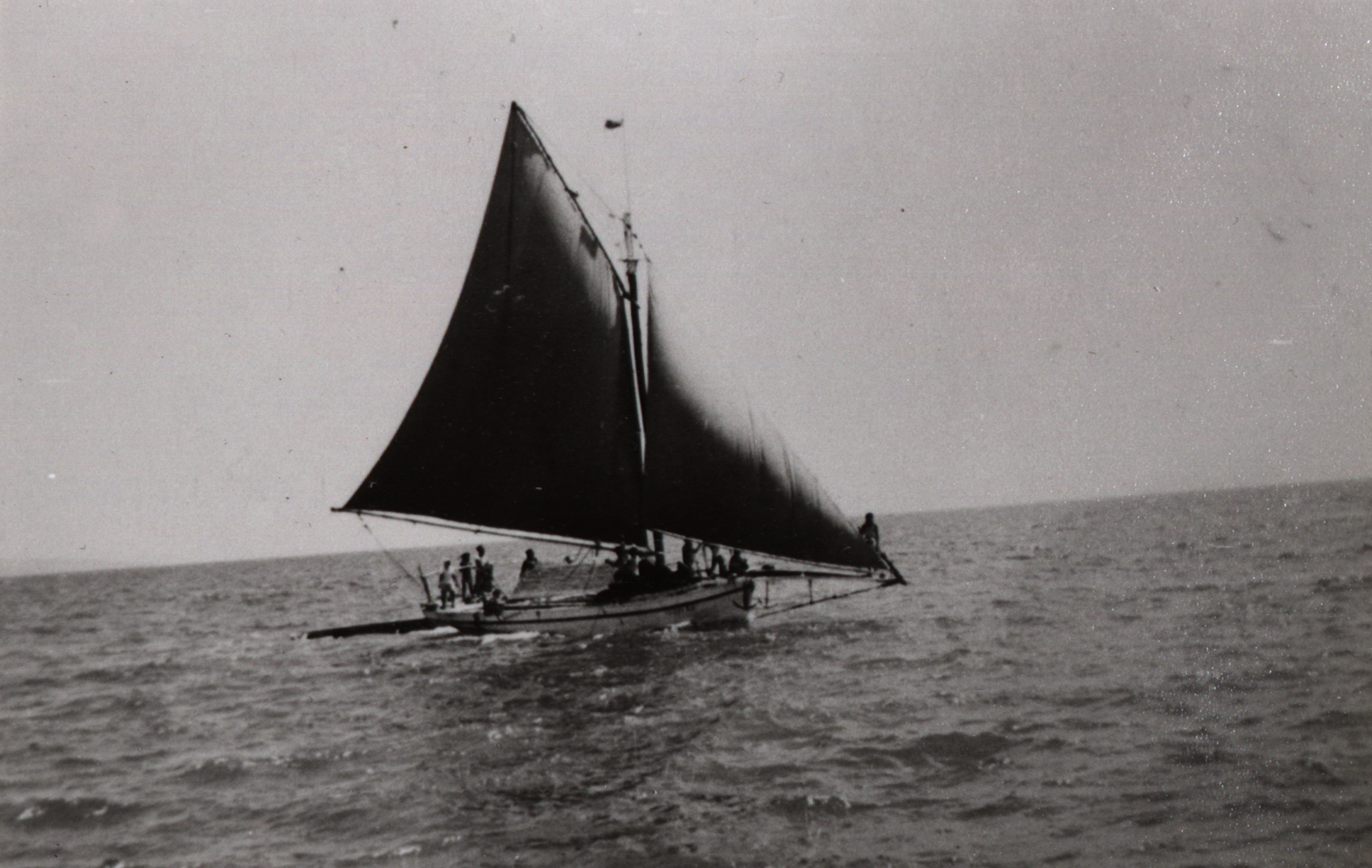
A lambo in Savu sea.

The term lambo or lamba refer to two types of traditional boats from Indonesia.

== Butonese lambo ==
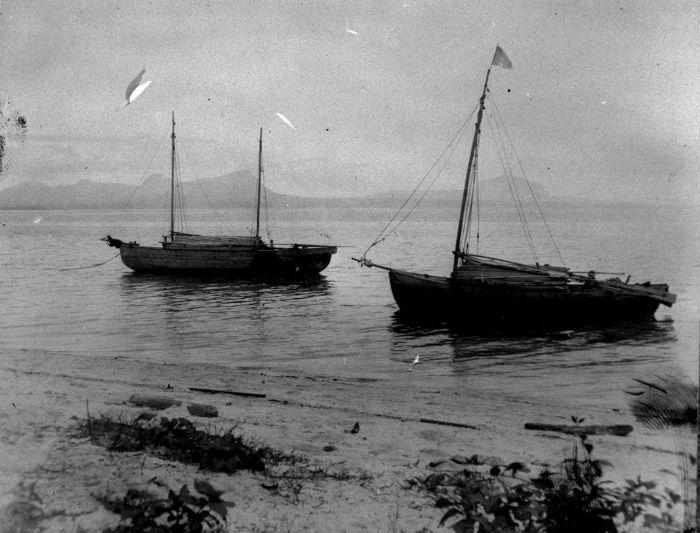
A 2-masted and a single-masted lambo, 1907–1915.

Lambo is the Indonesian version of small western styled merchant boats with one mast from the end of the 19th century. It is directly developed as merchant boats, and unlike other boats from Indonesia, it was not derived from local fishing perahu or canoe.

=== Etymology ===
The origin of the word "lambo" and its meaning is not clear. It is probable that this word is a crude dialog word meaning ''no mother", which means this boat doesn't incorporate ancestor traditions (that is, developed from Western boats). It may also be possible that, the word comes from Kawi (Old Javanese) language word "lambu" which means a kind of boat.

=== Description ===
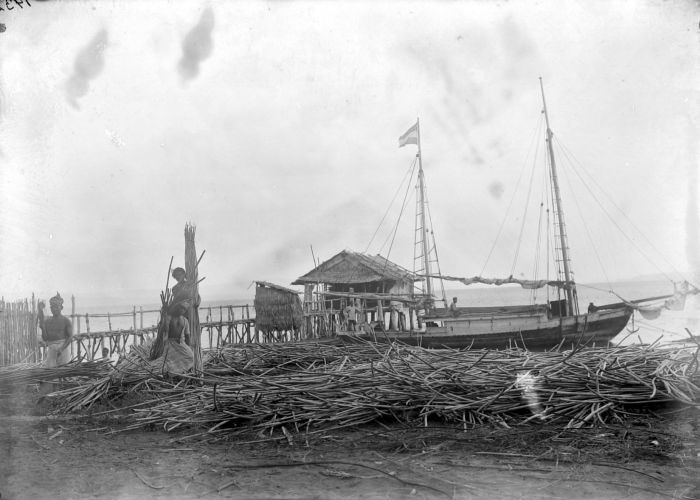
A lambo in Wayabula, Morotai, Moluccas.

It has two masts, with its sturdy rig and gaff easily recognized from afar. The defining features of this boat is the shape of the keel, bow, and the stern (it has "counter" type stern). Most of them weighed between 10 and 40 tons. As in most types of boats from this class there must be a deck house. Short deck at the front of the mast, usually with cooking stove located in movable kitchen box, and a canvas curtain atop the stern deck. Older boats has vertical bow and deeper keel. From the outside it may look like a copy of western boat, be it the hull type, hull shape, or the lines of the planking, but if seen closely it shows that this boat is constructed with frames from thick wood, cut to shapes and combined corner by corner with dowels. Western-styled flooring and ribs then applied after the frame is formed. This type of lambo could carry 700 pikul of cargo (about 43.75 tons), with total crew of only 6–7 men, which is the same as a palari or golekan with 500 pikul (31.25 tons) cargo. The length of Buton lambo is about 40–55 ft (12.2–16.8 m) at the waterline, with overall length of 58–80 ft (17.8–24.4 m).

== West Sulawesian lambo ==
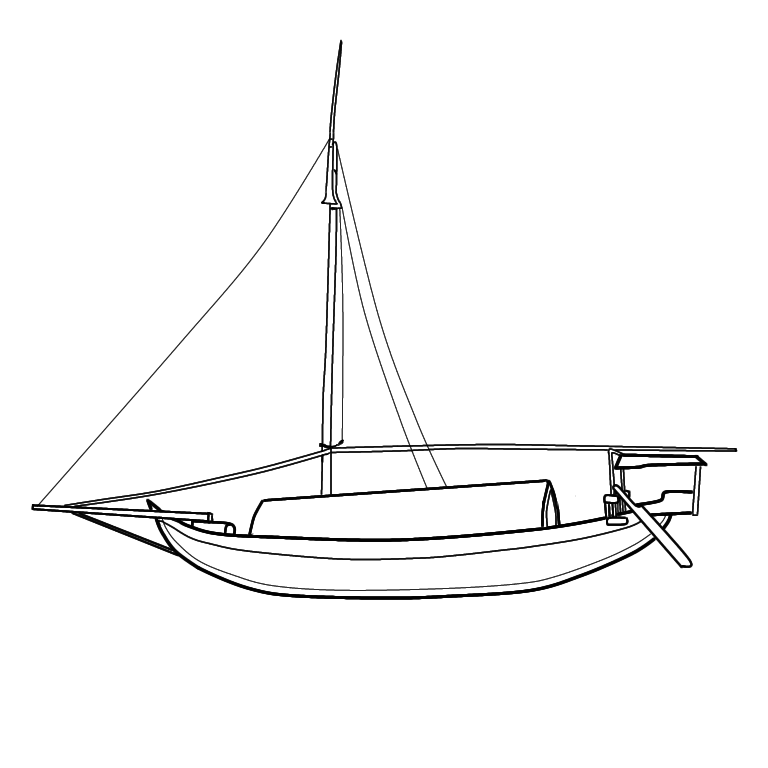
Sketch of a beached Mandarese lambo in Pare Pare. The hull is pajala, the structure at the stern is not an ambeng. The sail used is nade sail.

This type of perahu is the result of combining fore-and-aft rig with indigenous pajala-type hull made by Bugis and Makassar people. They can be seen in the area of river mouths and creeks at the North of Makassar. They also can be seen carrying sea turtles to Kampung Benoa, Bali, with Mandarese crew. In there they are known as bago by other sailors, but to Mandarese people in Sulawesi, bago is a term referring to small boats for catching fish.

=== Description ===
This lambo had traditional hull of southern West Sulawesi, its stempost and sternpost formed a smooth curve with the keel. The hull is the same as Makassar and Mandarese boat with a post to support the rudder. A deckhouse is located at the middle of the hull, with a bowsprit for supporting the headsail. It may be smaller than Makassarese bisean boat, the weight is around 20–30 tons, similar to Buginese palari boats from 1930s. Although the hull looked like Butonese lambo, the hull does not have straight long keel, perpendicular stem and sternpost, nor western-styled central rudder (West Sulawesian lambo is using double quarter rudder). It is single-masted, with cantilever support beam, large single foresail, and mainsail (in the form of nade sail). West Sulawesian lambo is about 45–60 ft (13.7–18.3 m) LOA, and 30–40 ft (9.1–12.2 m) length at waterline. The carrying capacity was 300–350 pikul (18.75–21.875 tons) of cargo, less than a palari of the same size, but they are faster and can be handled by smaller crew.

== As a hull ==
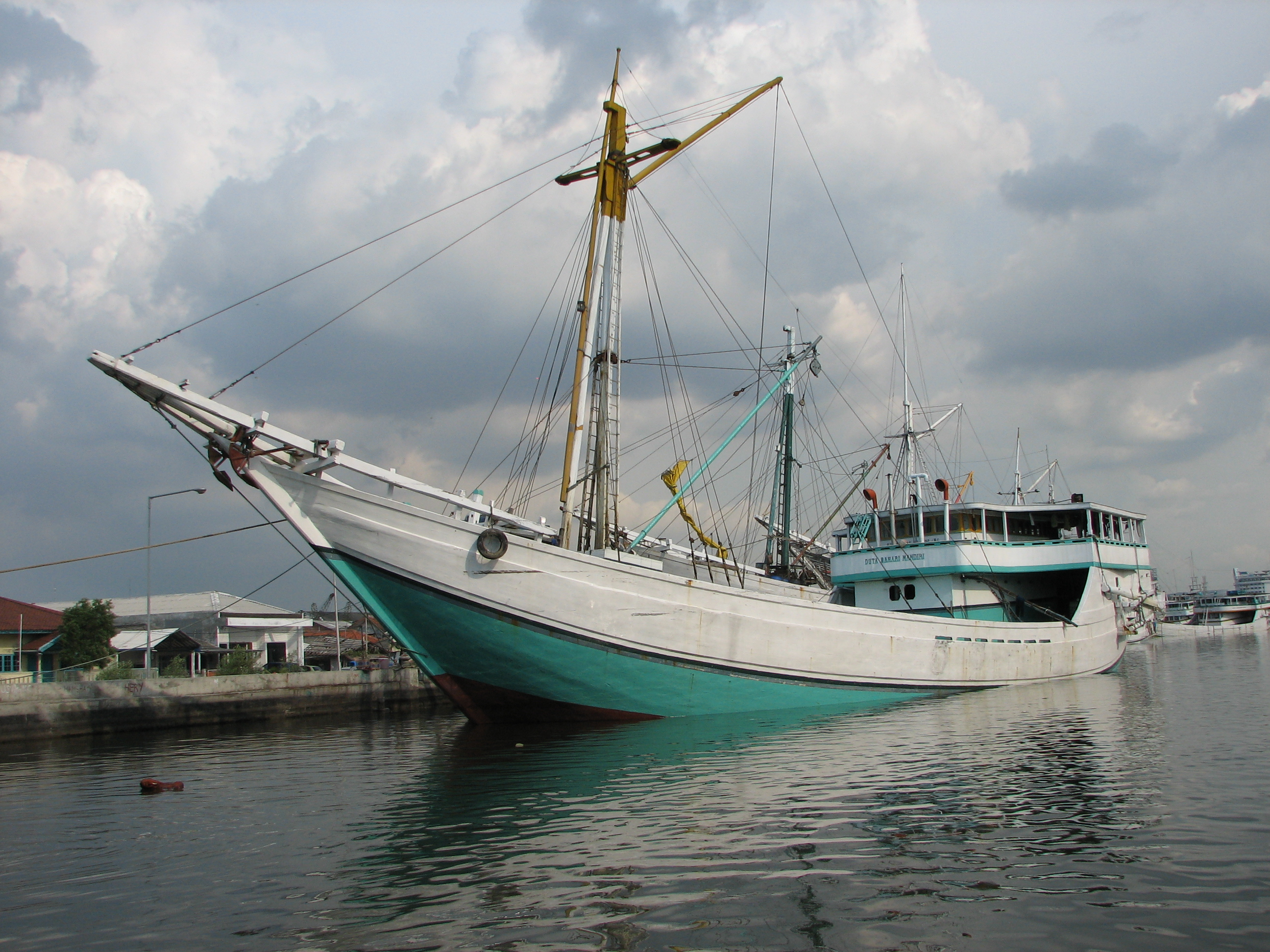
Motorized Lambo-hulled PLM

During the 1970s the Indonesian local vessels were progressively equipped with engines. Since machine installation did not fit well in traditional pinisi designs, lambo hull became a common alternative. In later years, their load capacities were increased until the current average of 300 tons, with the so-called PLM (perahu layar motor — motor sailing boat). Nearly every cargo boat seen nowadays in the local ports of Jakarta, Surabaya and Makassar are such modified lambos, still retaining some features from the original designs.

== Gallery ==
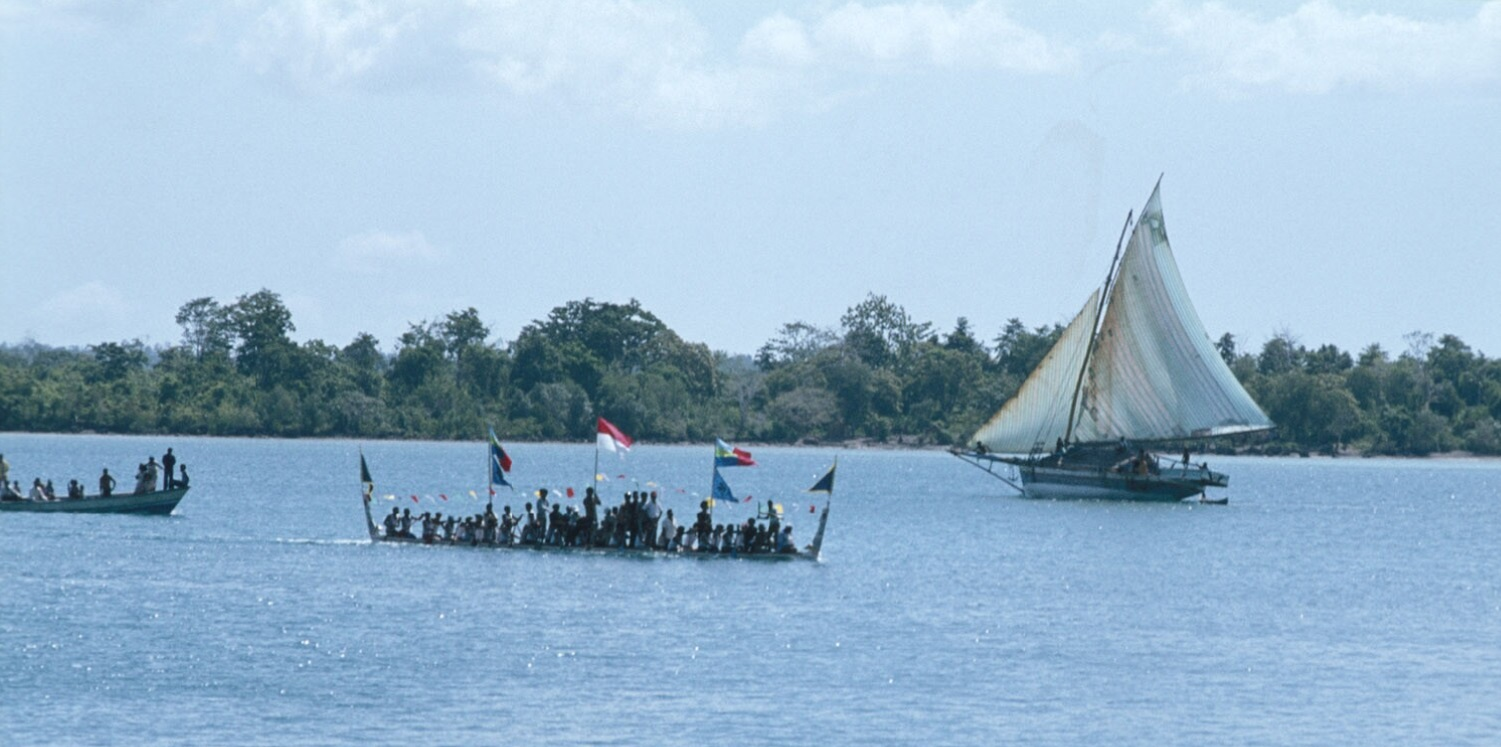
A lambo on the right, 1980.

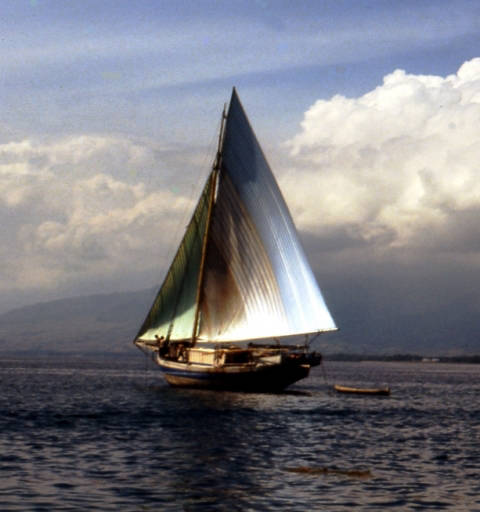
In still water, 1988.

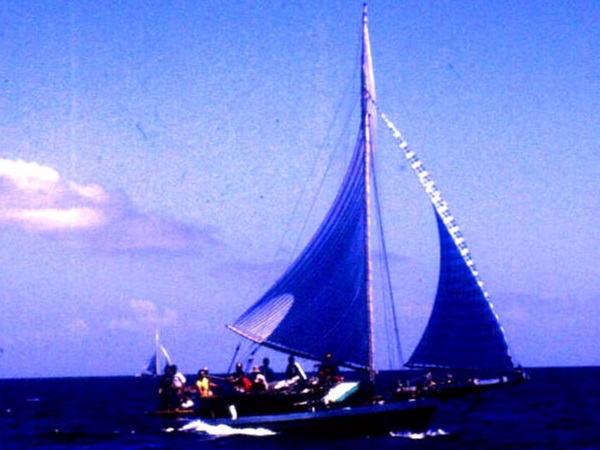
A Lambo Buton boat used for racing, 1989.

== See also ==
- Pinisi
- Palari (boat)
- Padewakang
- Leti leti
- Golekan
