= Pencalang =

Traditional Indonesian merchant boat

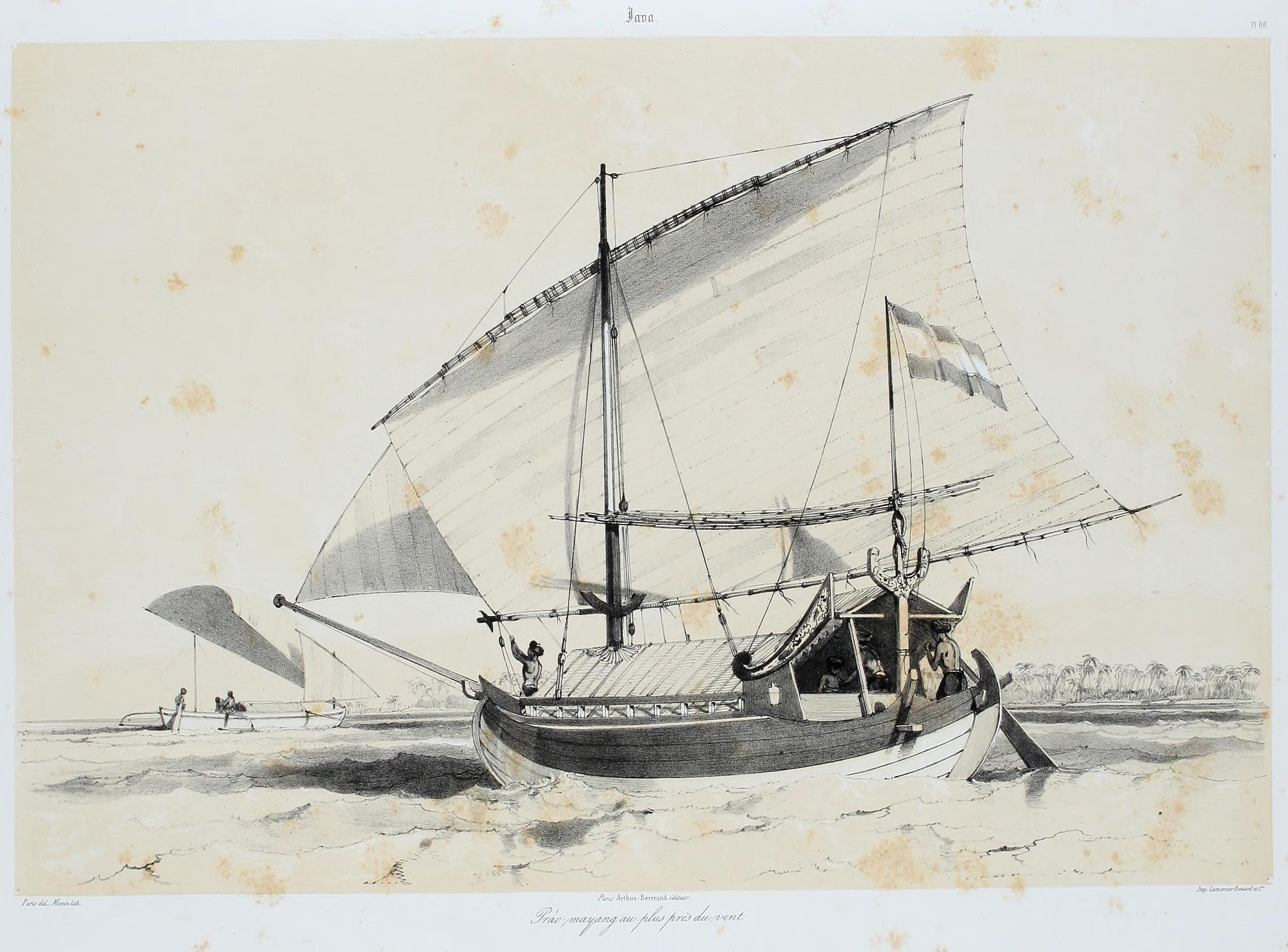
Pencalang (mislabelled as mayang) at full sail, Java, 1841

Pencalang is a traditional merchant ship from Nusantara. Historically it was also written as pantchiallang or pantjalang. It was originally built by Malay people from the area of Riau and the Malay Peninsula, but has been copied by Javanese shipwrights. By the end of the 17th century this ship has been built by Javanese and Chinese shipbuilders in and around Rembang. However it was a popular choice for Balinese skippers followed by Sulawesian skippers.

== Etymology ==
The word pencalang comes from Malay word, which has now been absorbed into Indonesian language, namely calang and mencalang, which means "to scout", "to recon", and "to peek". Therefore, pencalang can be interpreted as "a boat used for spying" or "recon boat". According to VOC glossarium, the Malay word pentjalang means "ship that was sent on the lookout", from the word tjalang which means "outlook" with added prefix pe(n)- as an equivalent to English suffix -or/-er.

== Description ==
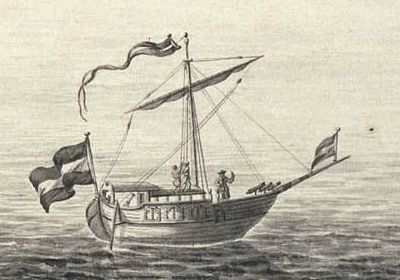
Pencalang preparing to set sail in Rembang. Several swivel guns can be seen.

Pencalang has one or two masts, with a deck covered the entire hull and a room in the middle for the cargo hold, closed with a fixed deck. The pencalang has a strongly curved front and rear stern and a round bottom with keel. The low freeboard is raised midship through the starboard. The ship has heavy transverse beams and a partial or continuous deck. A deckhouse has been built over most of the ship's hull. The helmsman is protected by a roof. The ship is steered with a side rudder that can be used by means of a hook on both sides of the ship. The sturdy mast, placed against a watertight bulkhead, can be lowered onto a mast support. The ship has a very wide and low tanja sail with boom. The rigging is connected to a long bowsprit. The crew is about 8–20 people. The length of the original local ships was 10.7 to 16.5 m with 3.7 to 5.5 m width. The draft is 1.8 to 3.7 m, slightly larger than those built for individual merchants. For the VOC they had a length of 55–60 ft (16.76–18.29 m) and a load capacity of 20–35 last (36.2–63.35 metric tons) at the beginning of the 18th century; later they became even larger with a length of 60–75 ft (18.29–22.86 m) and a capacity of 60–80 last (108.6–144.8 metric tons). Smaller than that they are usually used by pirates.

== Role ==
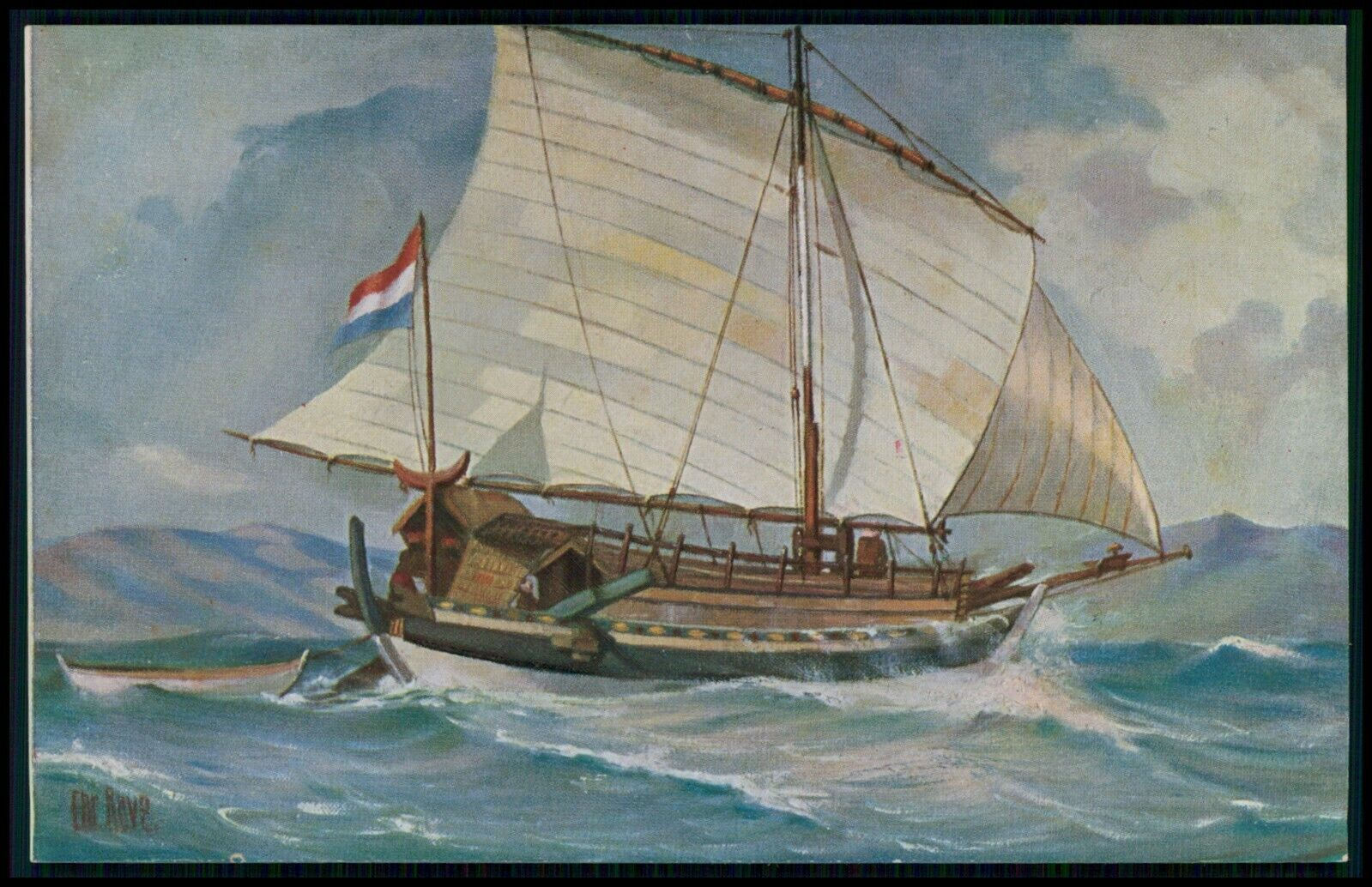
A Malay sailing vessel of the 19th century, probably a pencalang.

One of the earliest account of pencalang has a background from the 15th or 16th century, being mentioned in Hikayat Hang Tuah, which was composed no earlier than the 17th century. Two pencalang and two ghurab were used by Majapahit to send a letter and gifts to improve relationship with Malacca. Pencalang is mentioned in the Hikayat Indraputra as a weapon carrier.

Pencalang is mainly a merchant vessel, but occasionally can be used in warfare and piracy. VOC also had this type of ship built in Indonesia to have a small transport ship for use in Indian waters. While at the beginning of the 18th century the VOC had both sloops and pencalangs, at the end of that century only pencalangs were built. In warfare, pencalang is often used to spy on the enemy by using its merchant disguise. Because of the excellent sailing ability, VOC used this ship to fight against pirates.

== See also ==
- Chialoup
- Kakap (boat)
- Padewakang
- Kelulus
- Penjajap
- Mayang
