= Mayang (boat) =

Type of fishing boat from Java, Indonesia

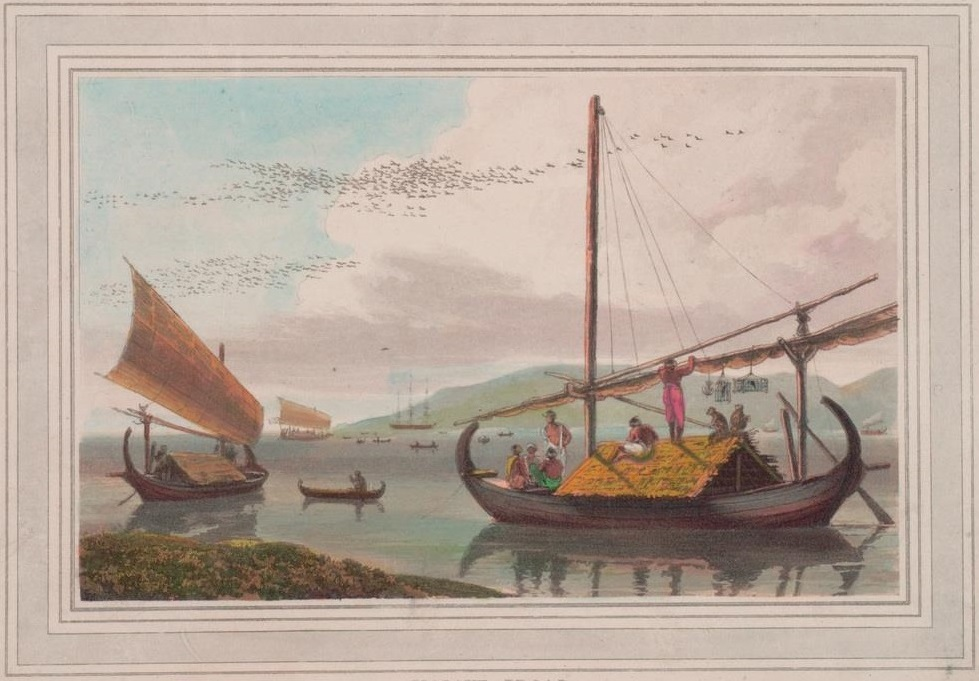
Two mayangs and several other boats, 1810.

Perahu Mayang or simply mayang is a type of fishing boat from Java, Indonesia. This type of boat is used mainly for fishing and trading. Historically, this indigenous vessel is also favored by European skippers and private merchants for trading in East Indies: 50% of them were using mayang and pencalang. It is mostly used in northern coast of Java. The major production site is in Rembang, Central Java.

== Etymology ==
The name mayang comes from payang (a type of seine) used by local fishermen. Thus the name can be translated as "using payang".

== Description ==
Major portion of the mayang hull is built using teak wood. The hull shape is broad, flat-bottomed with a pronounced bow and stern. It is deckless, but may have a covered "house" in the middle of the boat. Mayang are also built with a watertight bulkhead. In the 18th century, a Mayang is described as having a crew of 6 or 9 and is 12.2 to 15 metres long; with a 7.24 tonne burthen. A boat from 1850 had a beam of 3 m, a length of 12 m, and a depth of 1 m. There were at least 9 compartments for storing fish (called petak), three of them in front of the mast, separated from each other by bulkheads. The planks are all fixed by treenails (pasak) into the bulkheads. A Mayang has 1 mast with 1 sail of tanja, lateen, or crab claw type, with the tanja being the most common. It is steered using 1 axial rudder or 2 quarter (side) rudders. For defense, the mayang has no cannon, but has 1 swivel gun and 2 snaphaunces. Modern mayang are also equipped with an engine, and some of them also had a keel. A modern mayang is about 10–15 m long, 2–3 m breadth, with 0.5–0.9 m high hull. Mast height is 8–9 m, with sail area about 14×16 m.

Linggi (the foremost part of the frame) is about 2.1 m high, about 1.2 m in width and adorned with traditional motifs like flower, horse head, wayang figure and writings in bright colors. Its striking feature is the high mast with very long pembawon (the topmost bamboo spar used to tie the sail, in case with tanja type sail). To furl the sail, the lower spar/boom called penggiling is used. Mayang has shallow draft which makes it suitable to go to shore and rivers. The large sail propel the boat with relatively high speed, when the wind is unavailable row or paddle can be used instead.

The shape of the boat varied depending on location. In Madura, the mayang is an introduced boat. It is quite similar in construction technique to a perahu jaring but beamier and having a horn-like pole which is carried beyond the sides of the boat to the stern to support the net. Mayang from madura have a small bow, while the ones from East Java have a large brightly colored flat bow. Madurese mayang used the Madurese lete sail. East Javan mayang adopted the Madurese sail, with a tall mast, sail supporting ropes, the other mayang rigging is maintained. In western coast of Java, a mayang's bow tend to be smaller. In Rembang the boat has 2 vertical poles behind the stempost and is called a konting.

== Gallery ==
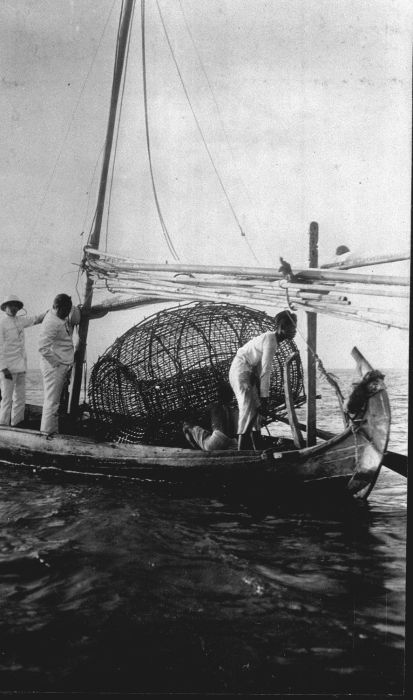
Mayang with a large fishing trap in the Thousand islands, bay of Batavia.

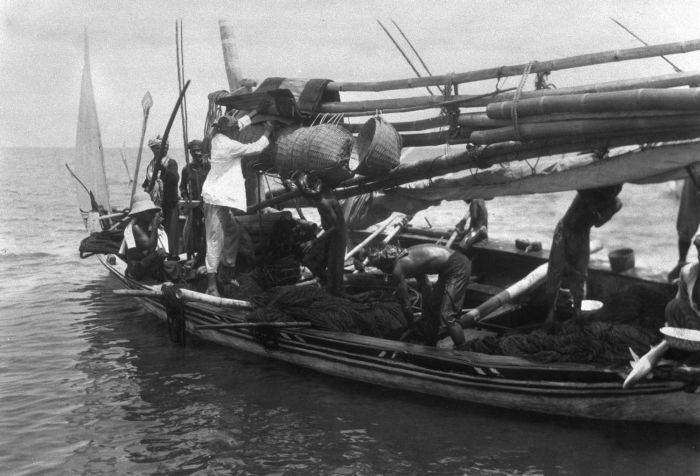
Mayang from Besuki, east Java

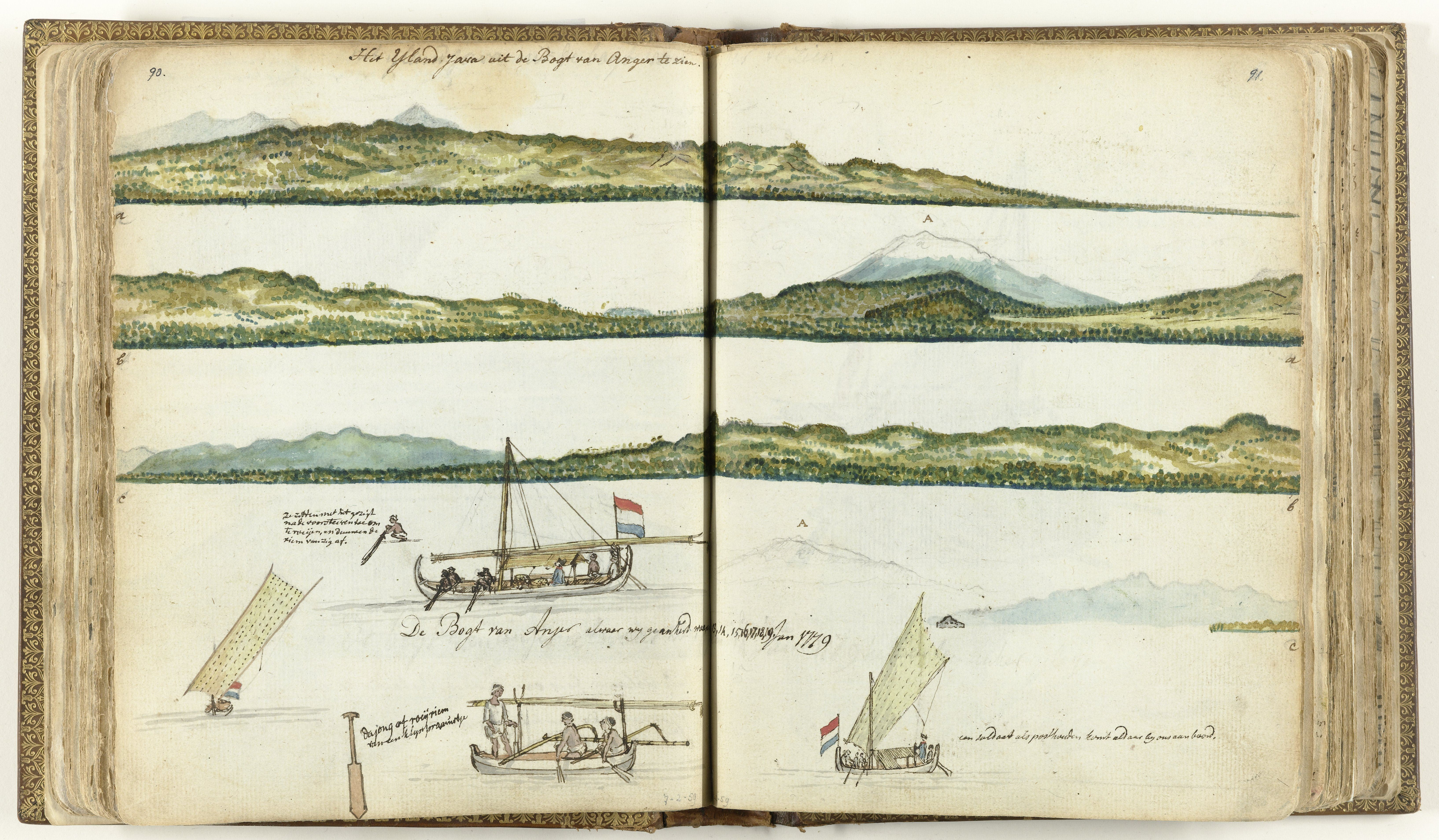
Two mayang in Anyer beach, by Jan Brandes, 1779.

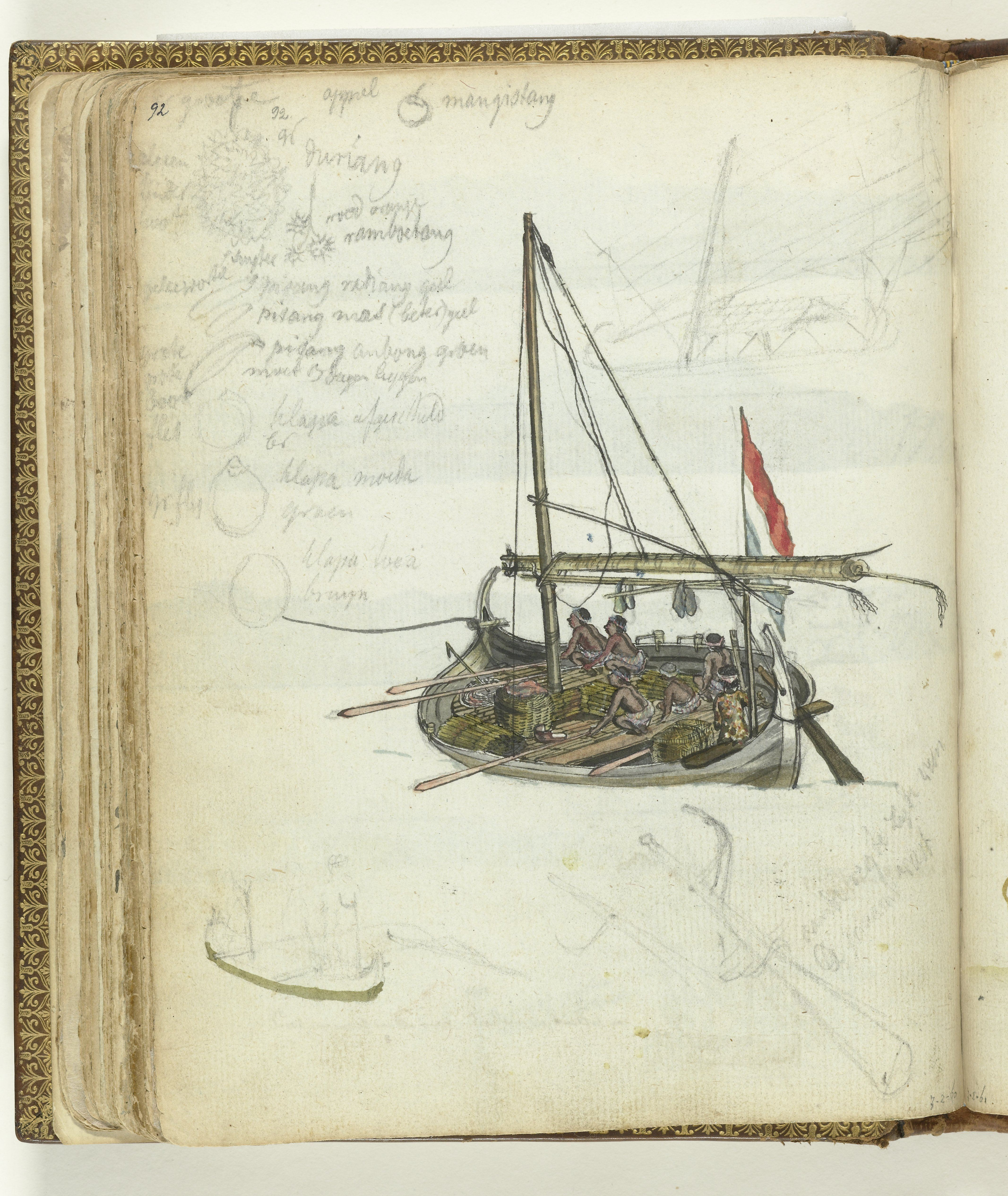
Jan Brandes' detailed sketch of an open Mayang, 1808.

== See also ==
- Perahu
- Pencalang
- Chialoup
- Kakap
- Jukung, another Indonesian traditional fishing boat
- Perahu payang, fishing boat from Malay peninsula
