= Pinisi =

Type of rigging of Indonesian sailing vessels

Pinisi, art of boatbuilding in South Sulawesi
- UNESCO Intangible Cultural Heritage
- Country: Indonesia
- Reference: 01197
- Region: Asia and the Pacific

Inscription history
- Inscription: 2017 (12th session)
- List: Representative

Pinisi-rigged boats, South Sulawesi, 1938.

A pinisi is a type of rigging (the configuration of masts, sails and ropes or 'lines') of Indonesian sailing vessels. A pinisi carries seven to eight sails on two masts, arranged like a gaff-ketch with what is called 'standing gaffs' — i.e., unlike most Western ships using such a rig, the two main sails are not opened by raising the spars they are attached to, but the sails are 'pulled out' like curtains along the gaffs which are fixed at around the centre of the masts.

As is the case with many Indonesia sailing craft, the word 'pinisi' thus names only a type of rig, and does not describe the shape of the hull of a vessel that uses such sails.

Pinisi-rigged ships were mainly built by the Konjo-speaking people of Ara, a village in the district of Bontobahari, Bulukumba regency, South Celebes, and widely used by Buginese and Makassarese seafarers as a cargo vessel. In the years before the eventual disappearance of wind-powered transport in course of the motorization of Indonesia's traditional trading fleet in the 1970/80s, vessels using a pinisi rig were the largest Indonesian sailing ships.

Today, the word 'pinisi' is, often rather indiscriminately, used to name most types of wooden ships of Indonesia. The popular spelling 'phinisi' was an attempt to mimic the Indonesia pronunciation of the word, /pi:nisi/, first used to name Phinisi Nusantara, a motorized traditional vessel with such a rig that in 1986 was sailed from Indonesia to Expo 86 in Vancouver, Canada.

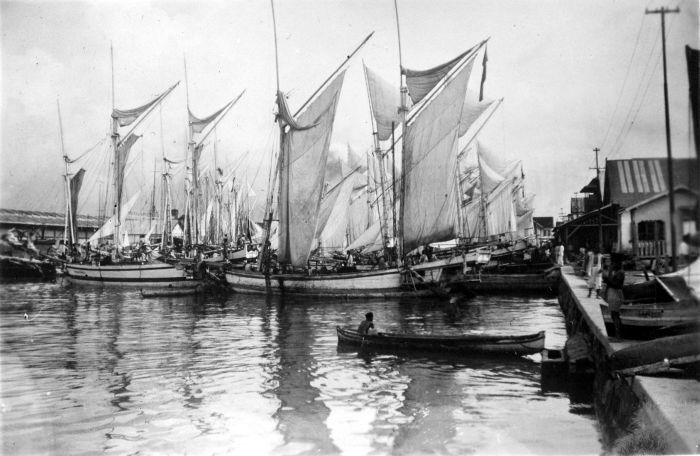
Pinisi-rigged boats at the port of Makassar.

Being the best-known Indonesian sailing-vessel, 'pinisi' became the tagline for the 2017 inscription of "The Art of Boatbuilding in South Sulawesi" in the UNESCO's Representative List of the Intangible Cultural Heritage of Humanity.

== Etymology and possible origin ==
Pinisi with palari hull, 1937.

The earliest mention, in both foreign and indigenous sources, of the term 'pinisi' that clearly refers to a type of sailing vessel from Celebes is found in a 1917 article in the Dutch periodical Coloniale Studiën: "... a small schooner rigged in European manner." Indeed, records of the use of European-type fore-and-aft rigs on indigenous ships of the Southeast Asia Archipelago only begin in the first half of the 19th century, and only in the early 20th century significant numbers of boats from Sulawesi were equipped with such sails. Until the mid-20th century, the Sulawesi sailors themselves referred to their ships by the term palari, the type of hull most suited for the driving forces of the pinisi rig.

There is a wide range of local traditions claiming a much earlier origin for both the word 'pinisi' and the type of ship thus called, many of which, however, can only be traced back to the last two to three decades. The shipwrights of Ara and Lemo-Lemo, the second boatbuilding centre of the region, relate their proficiency in naval architecture (and, depending on source, creation of the first pinisi) to Sawerigading, one of main protagonists in the Bugis epic Sureq Galigo: To avoid the incestuous relation impending when he fell in love with his twin sister, Sawerigading is given a magically built ship to sail to a place where a girl looking like her is said to dwell; when he breaks his promise to never return, the vessel sinks; its keel, frames, planks and masts, washed on the shores off the three villages, were reassembled by the local people, who thus learned how to build and sail ships. It is of note that in the actual epic Sawerigading returns to his homelands, to, together with his new-found wife, eventually become the ruler of the underworld, and that the term 'pinisi' does not show up in any of the accessible manuscripts of the story. The names of the boats and ships contained in the manuscripts are waka(q), wakka(q), wakang, wangkang, padewakang, joncongeng, banawa, pelapangkuru, binannong, pangati, and lopi. The boat that brought Sawerigading to Cina (not China, but Tana Ugi, Ale Cina, at the eastern side of South Sulawesi) itself was called waka Wélenrénngé (boat made of Wélenréng tree), it's made of just one tree (dugout canoe), equipped with outriggers and outrigger floats. Perceivably, "the myth supports the people of Bontobahari in their dependence on boatbuilding as a way of life, [...] justify[ing] their monopoly" on the building of such vessels.

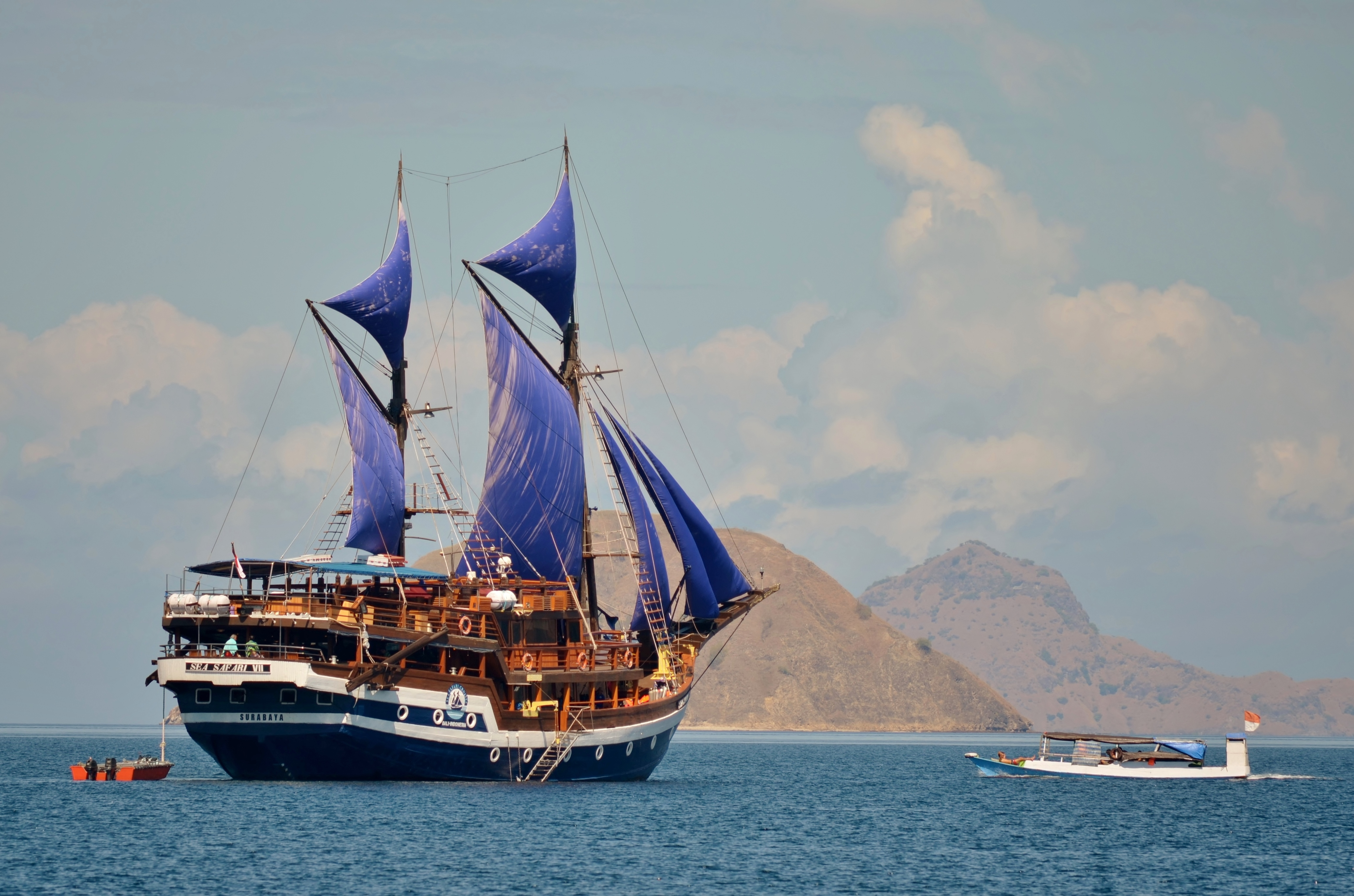
Pinisi sailing ship exploring Komodo island, part of Lesser Sunda Islands

Since the 1970s, a wide range of other explanations for the origin of the word 'pinisi' have been forwarded. These include that, e.g., a ruler of the Makassan polity of Talloq, I Mangnginyarrang Daéng Makkiyo, named thus one of his boats, allegedly combining the two words "picuru" (meaning "good example") and "binisi" (a type of small, agile and tough fish on the surface of the water and not affected by currents and waves). Another version states that the name pinisi comes from word panisi (Bugis word, means insert), or mappanisi (inserting), which refers to caulking process. It is even claimed that the word derived from the name of the Italian city of Venice, where the sailors of the village of Bira traded spices and saw ketch-rigged vessels; or where schooner rigs were 'invented', thus lending the name to its Sulawesian version. None of these claims is supported by identifiable first-hand sources.

A conceivable anecdote of the origin of both the name and type of ship is based on a report by R.S. Ross, then master of the British East India Company's steamer Phlegeton, who on the occasion a visit to Kuala Terengganu, Malaysia, in 1846 witnessed a schooner built locally by "some of the natives [who] had learnt the art of shipbuilding at Singapore, and [were] assisted by Chinese carpenters", that is speculated to have become the archetype for the Terengganu perahu pinas or pinis. Malay traditions allege that this schooner was built on behalf of Baginda Omar, the Sultan of Terengganu (reigned 1839–1876), possibly either under direction or with considerable help by a German or French beachcomber who had "reached Terengganu, by way of Malacca and Singapore, in search of "otium cum dignitate", to become the archetype of the 'Malay schooner': The Terengganu pinas/pinis, today carrying batten-lug sails, until the turn to the 20th century was commonly rigged as a gaff-ketch.

However, at around the same time, Dutch sources began to note a new type of locally employed sailing vessel registered by harbourmasters in the western part of the Malay Archipelago as 'penisch', 'pinisch', or 'phinis'(!); by the end of the 19th century the use of such vessels apparently had spread to Bali, Kalimantan and Sulawesi. The word itself was possibly taken from the Dutch, German or French pinasse or peniche, by then the name for a rather unspecified small to medium sized sailing craft — the English 'pinnace' already in the 18th century named one of the boats carried aboard a war-vessel or a larger trading ship.

== General description ==
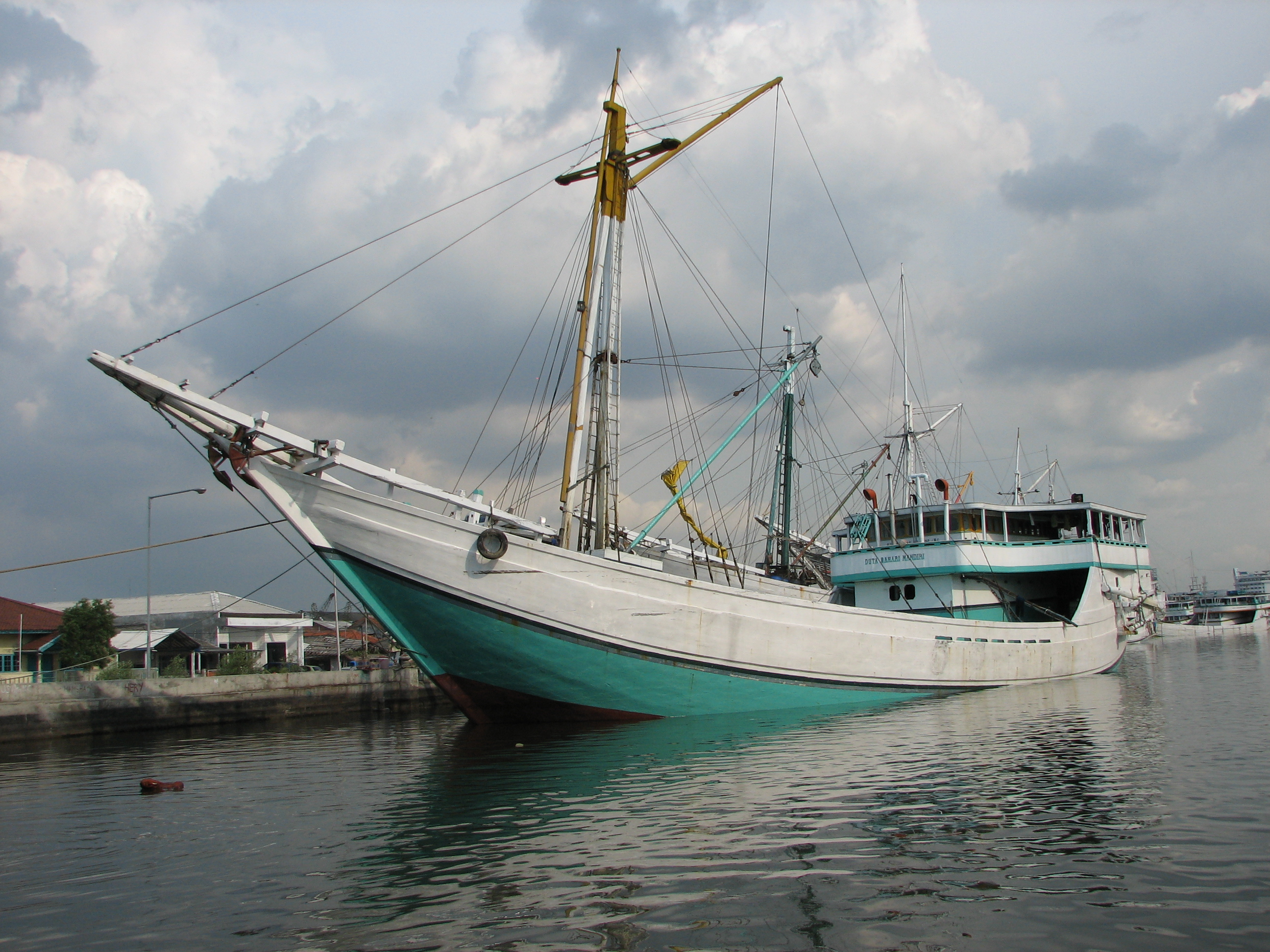
Motorized Lambo, the sail has been removed

The pinisi rig comprises seven to eight sails on two masts, i.e., three foresails (in Konjo, the language of the Bontobahari shipwrights, cocoroq) set over a long bowsprit (anjong), a main and main-topsail on the main mast (sombalaq bakka and tampaseqreq), mizzen and mizzen-topsail on the smaller mast aft (sombalaq ri boko and tampaseqreq ri boko), plus, mainly on older vessels, a mizzen staysail (parasang) between the masts. With sails set, a pinisi-rigged vessel looks like what in international sailing terminology is called a gaff- (or, less precise, schooner-) ketch: 'Schooner' because all its sails are 'fore-and-aft' sails, i.e., lined up along the centreline of the hull on two masts, with the two biggest sails being trapezoid and attached to 'gaffs' (the spars on the top of the sails); 'ketch', because the mizzen mast is not as tall as the main mast. When the sails are taken in, however, a major difference to most 'Western' ketches shows — the gaff is not lowered or raised with the sails, but is, with its claw stepped onto a piece of hardwood on the aft side of the mast, at around the crosstrees hung into a jackstay that runs from the mast cap to and through the gaff's peak, back to and through its forward end and then is fixed around the mast above the crosstrees. Main and mizzen sails, the canvas with the largest driving force, are run along the lower part of that jackstay, and set and taken in, somewhat like curtains, by a halliard, a downhaul and a number of brails.

There is no boom for the main sail, while a light spar holds the loose-footed mizzen. The gaffs are controlled by two pairs of vangs running both downward and to the fore. On the oldest documented vessels with a pinisi rig, the lower main mast is a tripod, with ratlines in form of small crossbeams between the two poles aft; on the newer ones a bipod is used, and ratlines are replaced by wooden ladders tied to the shrouds. Masts are generally stepped in tabernacles. The topmasts are attached with crosstrees and mastcaps in a rather 'Western' fashion; the bowsprit is flanked by planks that replace the sprit-shrouds and are interconnected by cross-beams onto which the forestays are fixed.

Intended for engine-less, wind-driven sailing, the original pinisi-rig had masts much taller than those employed on the last ships carrying such sails, the charter and diving vessels often marketed as 'phinisi': Stricken and with its feet in the tabernacles, the main masts' crosstrees should rest on a beam crossing the aft deck, the timbang layaraq (the 'sail's scale'), thus covering roughly two-thirds of the vessel's LOD; to be able to step the topmast by pushing it upwards from the deck, it should be a little less as tall as the distance from deck to crosstrees.

== Types of hull ==
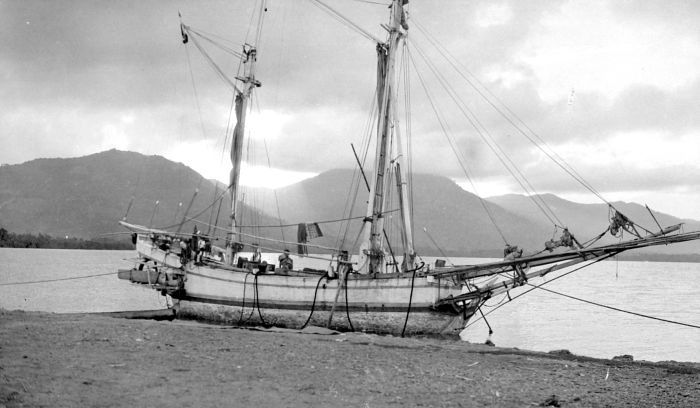
A beached Palari-hulled Pinisi. Note the low bow deck, called a salompong.

There are three general types of hull using the Pinisi rig.

- Palari. Older type of Pinisi with a curved stern and keel. It is made by adding more height on a pajala hull. They were usually smaller than the Lambo and used 2 quarter rudder mounted at the side of the stern. It is distinguishable by the presence of salompong (low foredeck), and ambeng (stepped, hanging stern deck). Motorized version usually had single mechanized rudder behind its propeller, but majority of motorized vessel favored the lambo hull.
- Jonggolang. A type of hull appeared in the mid-20th century, no longer built by raising a pajala hull, but are made from the start as high as the customer wishes. With that, the salompong which had become one of the characteristics of padewakang and palari disappeared; and the ambeng no longer hangs above the hull as found on both types of boats.
- Lambo hull with pinisi rig. Pinisi of a long and slender built, having a straight stern. This type of Pinisi is the one currently surviving in its motorized version (PLM). Used single mechanized axial rudder, but some retained the quarter rudder for aesthetic purpose.

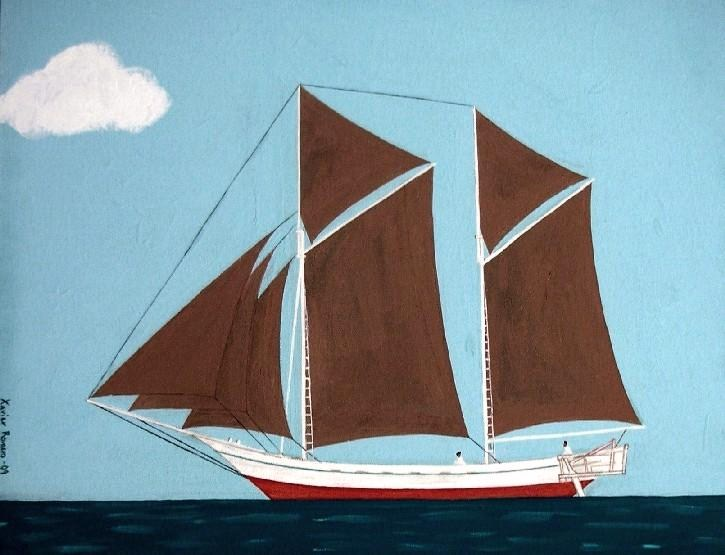
Drawing of Lamba hull with pinisi rig.

The original pinisi-rigged ship (palari), is about 50 to 70 feet (15.24 to 21.34 m) in length overall, with light laden waterline of 34 to 43 feet (10.36 to 13.11 m). Smaller palari is only about 10 m in length. In 2011 a large pinisi-rigged PLM has been completed in Bulukumba, South Sulawesi. It is 50 m long and 9 m wide, with a capacity of about 500 tons.

== History ==
Mandarese palari with pinisi rig.

In the 19th century, Sulawesian sailor began to combine the traditional tanja rig with fore-and-aft rig from Western ships sailing through the archipelago. Pinisi evolved from the base hull of Padewakang with front-and-aft rig to its own hull model with a native "pinisi rig". During these evolutionary decades, Indonesian sailors and shipbuilders changed some features of the original western schooner. The first Sulawesian pinisi was thought to has been first built in 1906 by the shipbuilders of Ara and Lemo-Lemo, they built the first penisiq [sic] for a Bira skipper.

At first, schooner rig was applied to padewakang hull, but eventually the sailor used the faster palari hull instead. Almost the whole hull is cargo room, only a small cabin placed at the stern serve as captain's room, meanwhile the crew sleep on the deck or cargo room. The usage of double quarter rudder is retained.

Since the 1930s, this sailing ship adopted a new type of sail, the nade sail, which came from cutters and sloops used by Western pearl seekers and small traders in Eastern Indonesia. In the 1970s more pinisi were equipped with engines, which favored the use of lambo type hull. Because the sails only used as complement to the engine, the sails were removed, but some vessels retained its masts. These types of ships are called Perahu Layar Motor (PLM) — Motorized Sailing Vessel.

In the subsequent years the cargo capacity of pinisi increased to an average of 300 tons. Nade sails used on medium-sized ships, and the larger ships used pinisi rig. But because the masts became shorter due to installed engine as propulsion, the sails are only used in favorable winds.

== Design and construction ==
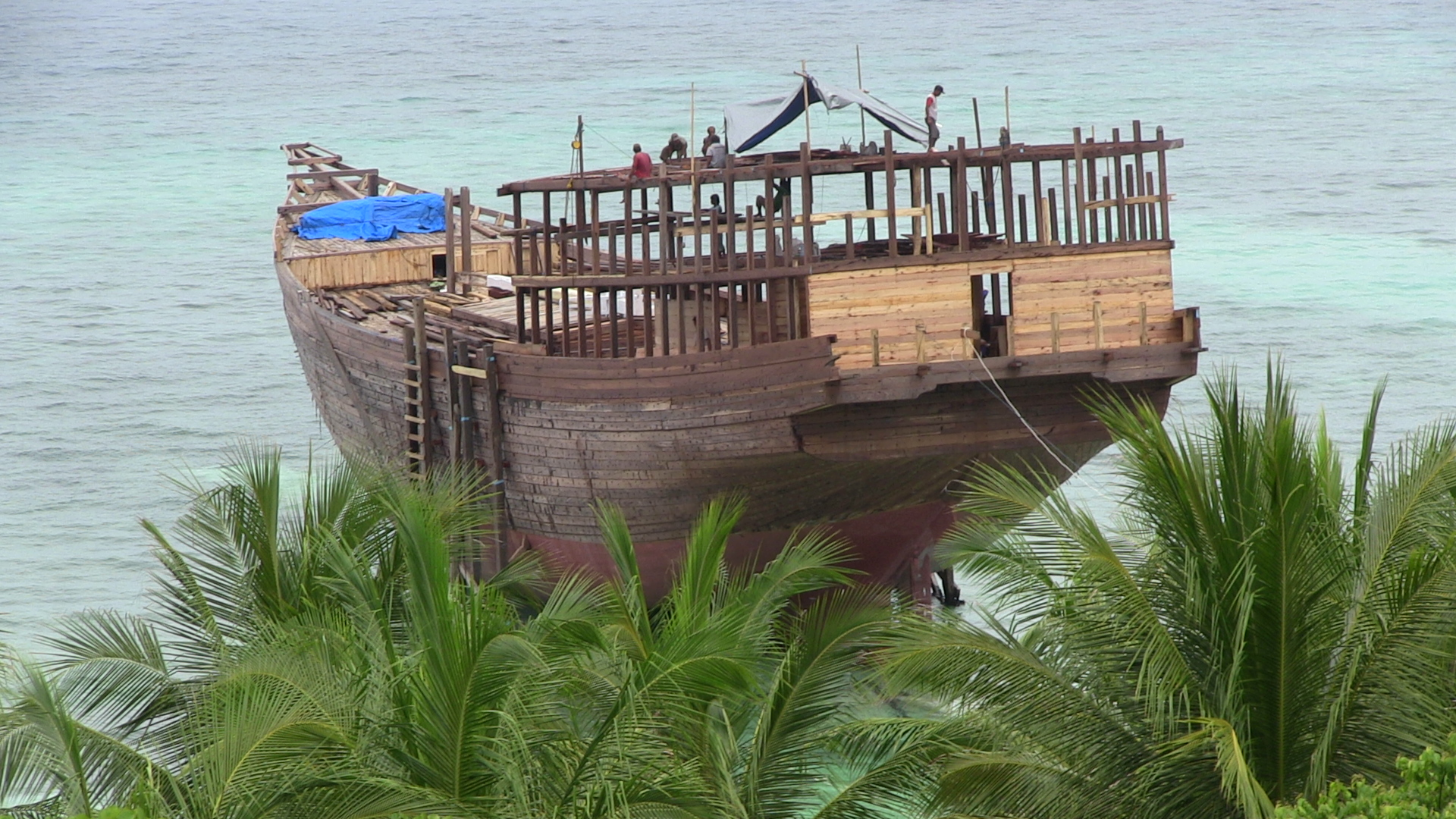
Construction of a pinisi vessel

Several parts of the pinisi are referred to by their original Buginese names, such as:

- Anjong, (balancing triangle) located at the front deck (Anjungan)
- Sombala, (main sail) the largest sail in the ship
- Tanpasere, (small sail) triangle-shaped sail, located at each mast
- Cocoro pantara (front additional sail)
- Cocoro tangnga (middle additional sail)
- Tarengke (row additional sail)

== Modern use ==
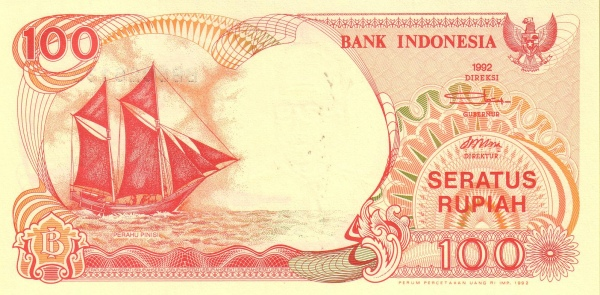
Pinisi featured in 100-rupiah banknote.

Today, pinisi mainly used for trade, serves as inter-insular cargo, such as to transport timber from Kalimantan to Java, in exchange to transporting grocery and goods from industrialized Java to more remote ports in Indonesian archipelago. Pinisi often frequent traditional ports, such as Sunda Kelapa port in Jakarta, Surabaya, Banjarmasin, and the port of Makassar.

As with many traditional ship types, pinisi have been provided with motors, largely since 1970. This has changed the appearance of the ships. Comparable to modern dhows, the masts have been shortened, or omitted as deck cranes vanished completely, while structures on deck, usually aft, have been enlarged for the crew and passengers. In the early 1970s thousands of pinisi-palari ships measuring up to 200 tonnes of cargo, the world's largest commercial sailing fleet at the time, had contacted all corners of the Indonesian seas and became the trading backbone of the people.

The pinisi is often modified into yacht charter boats by foreigner investors for tourism purposes. A recent visible example is the pinisi boat used as a pitstop for The Amazing Race.

== Misconceptions ==
Several common misconceptions about pinisi are widely circulated in the media and especially on the internet:

1. A pinisi is a type of ship. Pinisi is a sailing rig—a particular combination of spars and sails. The vessels commonly called pinisi are ships fitted with that rigging, such as lambo and palari.
2. Pinisi has been around for hundreds of years, since the 14th century. The pinisi rig existed only after 1900.
3. Pinisi ships visited the port of Venice, Italy centuries ago. Research on historical records from the Dutch East Indies and Italy has found no record of pinisi ships visiting there in the past.
4. Pinisi is an indigenous creation. Actually, the pinisi rig mimics the European schooner or ketch rigs. The difference is how to take in the sail: in the European schooner rig the sail is reefed vertically, while in the pinisi rig the sail is rolled lengthwise toward the mast.
5. Pinisi rigged vessels were built by the Makassarese and Buginese people. They were made by Bira, Ara, Lemo-Lemo, and Tana Beru people, who are Konjo tribes.

== See also ==
- Padewakang
- Paraw
- Tongkang
- Kora kora
- Borobudur ship
- Schooner
- Pinas (ship)
