= Parrel beads =

Element of sailing rigging

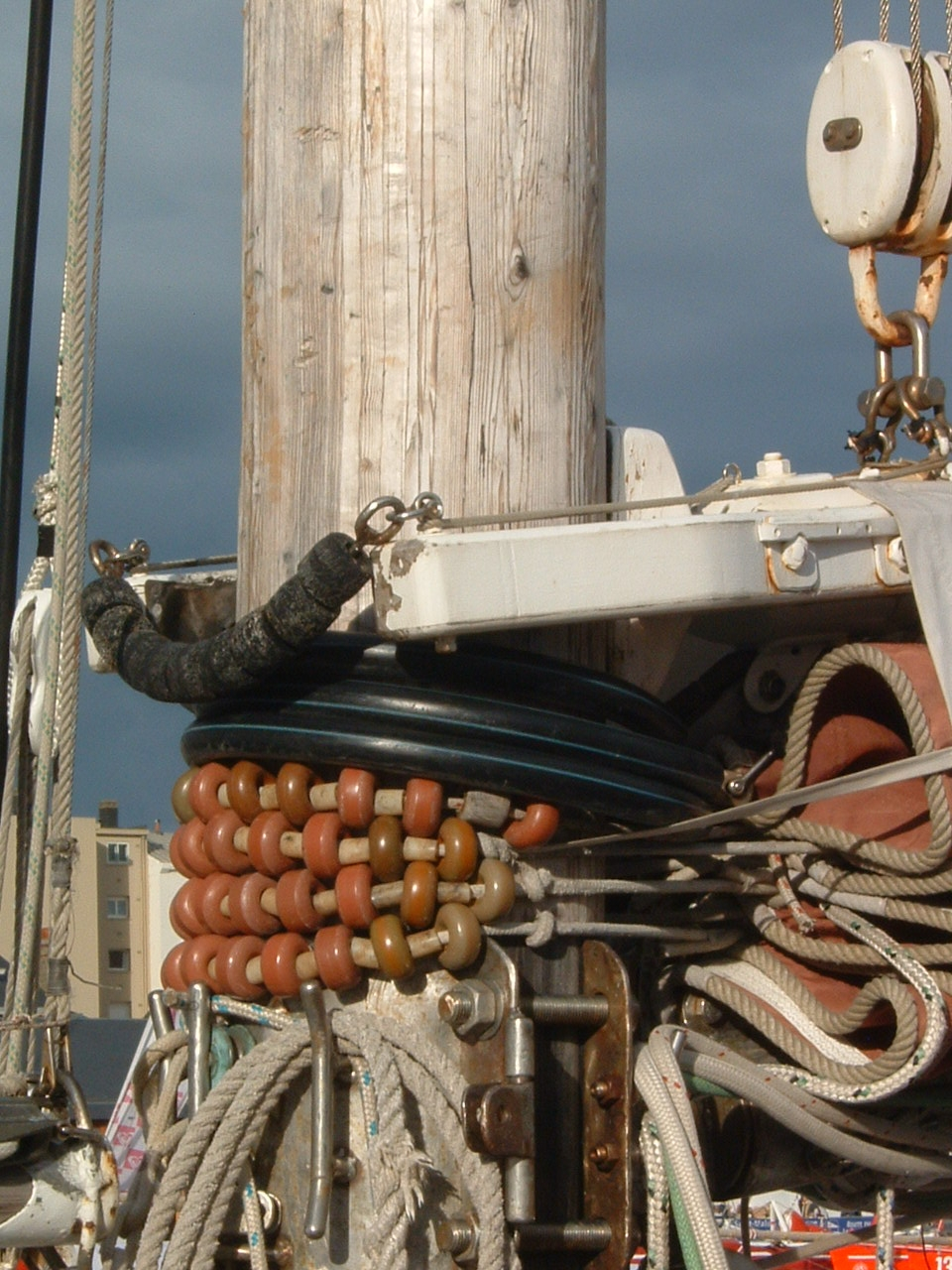
Two examples of parrel beads in use on a gaff sail. The black beads are on the parrel that attaches the gaff to the mast: it is attached to the jaws of the gaff. The brown beads are on individual parrels that connect the luff of the sail to the mast.

Parrel beads (also spelled parral or parrell) are an element of sailing rigging. They act as roller bearings on a parrel, which is a rope or wire strop that typically fastens one spar to another along which it must have some freedom of movement. An example of this is at the jaws of a gaff on a gaff rigged or gunter rigged craft. This allows the gaff to slide up and down the mast as sail is hoisted or lowered, and allows some rotation around the mast as the sail is sheeted in and out to allow for different wind directions. Another example is on the tack of a spinnaker rigged over a furled jib.

== Construction ==
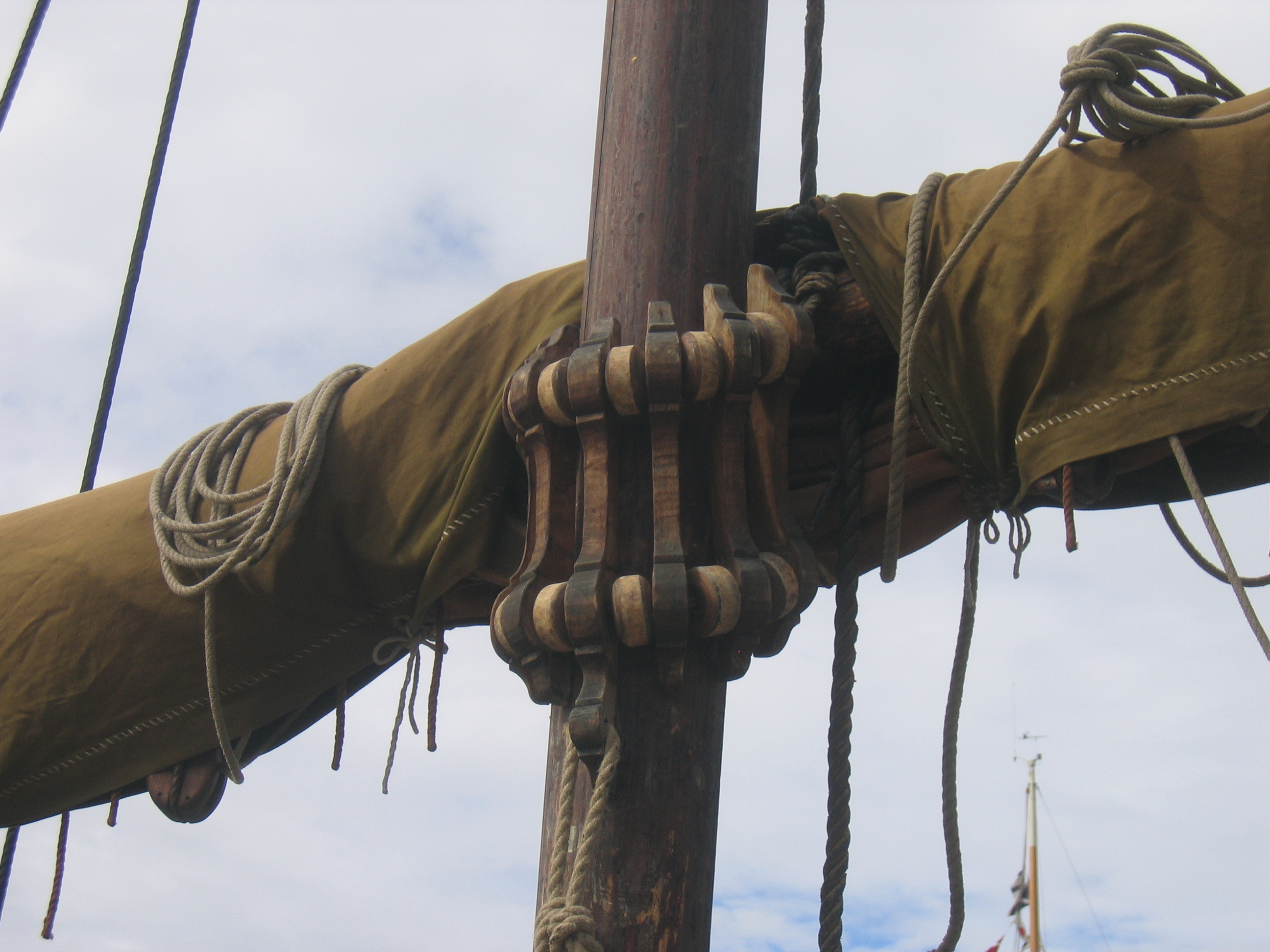
The type of parrel used on larger vessels which combines trucks (beads) and ribs (the vertical wooden bars). This type of arrangement is seen on older square rigged vessels, such as the Mary Rose. Note the downhaul attached to one of the ribs.

A set of parrel beads is formed from small balls, size depending on the application, threaded on a piece of small line and secured with a stopper knot at each end.

== Use ==
One end of the line is usually permanently bent to the movable item. When in use the movable item is positioned where it is required, and the free end of the parrel bead line is passed around the static item and secured back to the movable item. Their function is to secure the movable item in place, but to allow it to move along and around the device.
