= Drascombe Lugger =

Sailboat class

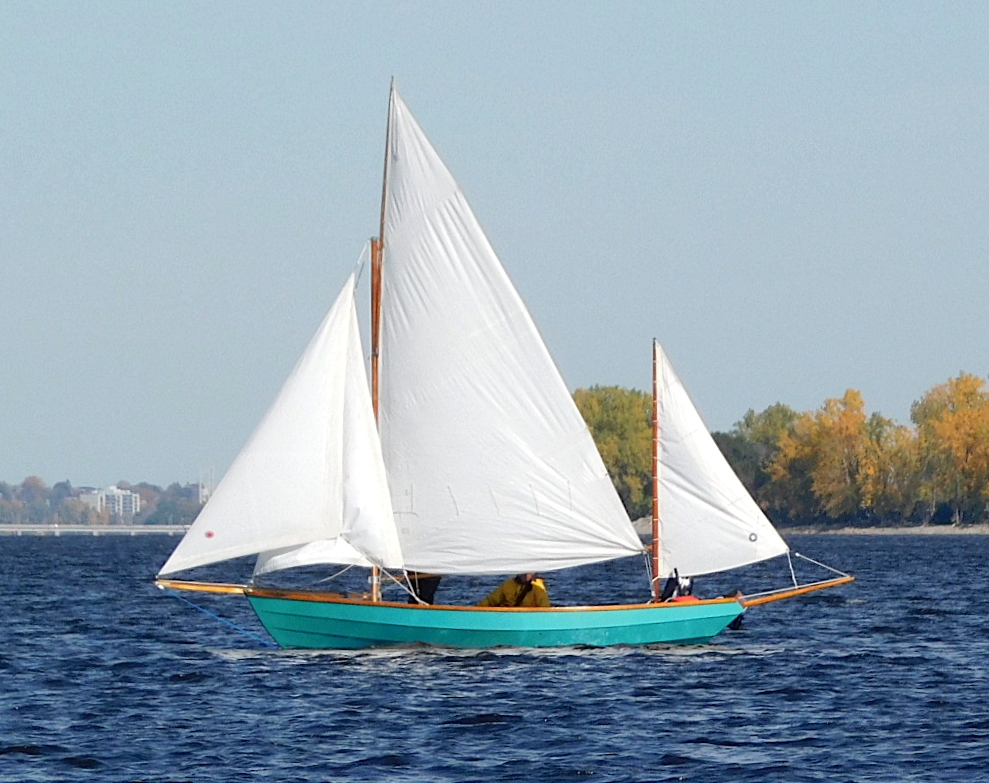

Development
- Designer: John L. Watkinson
- Location: United Kingdom
- Year: 1968
- No. built: more than 2,000
- Builders: Honnor Marine Classics, Churchouse Boats, Drascombe Boats
- Name: Drascombe Lugger

Boat
- Displacement: 600 lb (272 kg)
- Draft: 4.00 ft (1.22 m), centreboard down

Hull
- Type: Monohull
- Construction: Fiberglass
- LOA: 18.75 ft (5.72 m)
- LWL: 14.50 ft (4.42 m)
- Beam: 6.25 ft (1.91 m)
- Engine: well-mounted outboard motor

Hull appendages
- Keel: centreboard
- Ballast: 100 lb (45 kg)
- Rudder: folding rudder

Rig
- Rig type: Cutter rigged yawl

Sails
- Sailplan: Gunter rigged
- Total sail area: 132 sq ft (12.3 m^{2})

The Drascombe Lugger is a small open sailing boat designed for coastal cruising, and day sailing. It is characterized by its shallow hull, ballasted centerboard, and lug-and-mizzen yawl rig. It has a relatively heavy displacement for its size, giving it greater stability and load-carrying ability than typical dinghies. Drascombe Luggers have been widely used for coastal passages, camping cruises, and extended day sailing.

The Drascombe Lugger is one of range of Drascombe boats with different hull, cabin and rig configurations.

It was first built in 1968, with more than 2,000, built, and still production.

The design is built by Honnor Marine Classics and by Drascombe Boats in the United Kingdom.

== Design ==
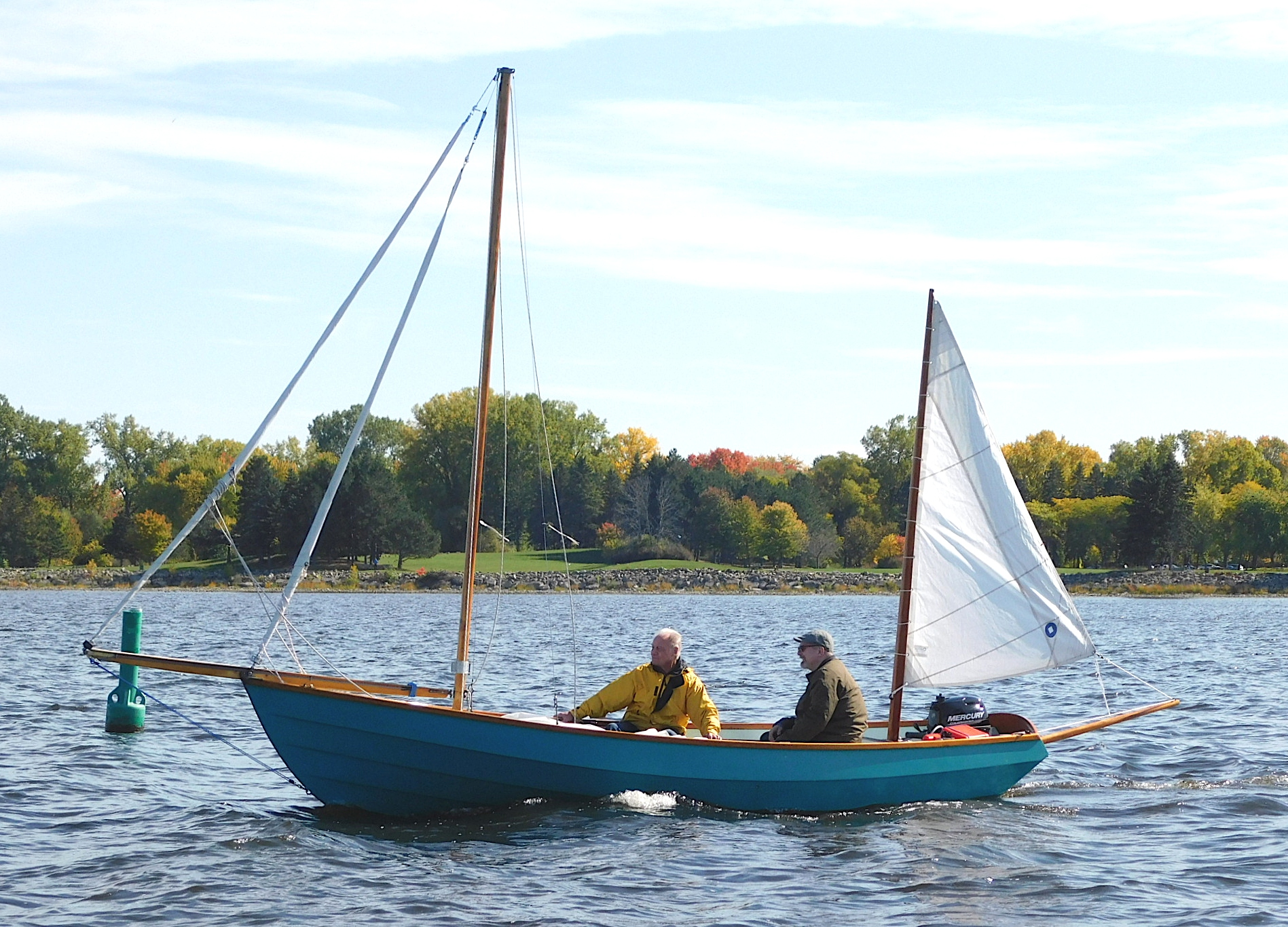
Drascombe Lugger motoring

Designed by John L. Watkinson, a former Royal Navy officer. In the early 1960s he wanted to build a small boat for his own family use. His design goals were for a trailerable day sailer that would be stable and safe, but still exciting to sail for experienced sailors.

The prototype was built of wood on a farm in Drascombe Barton. The design was based upon the fishing boats used on England's northeastern coast, which trace their lineage back to the Viking longships. The first boats had a lug rig, for which it was named, later switching to a Gunter rig.

The design was put into production, made from fiberglass and proved a commercial success. Boats have been built commercially on a production line and also by amateur builders. Plans for home construction have not been available since the death of the designer in 1997.

It features a spooned raked stem, a raised transom, an internally mounted fold-up rudder controlled by a tiller and a centreboard. It can be equipped with a bowsprit and cutter rig. It displaces 600 lb (272 kg) and carries 100 lb (45 kg) of ballast in the steel centreboard.

The boat has a draft of 4.00 ft (1.22 m) with the centreboard extended and 0.83 ft (0.25 m) with it retracted, allowing beaching or ground transportation on a trailer.

For docking and maneuvering, the boat is normally fitted with a small outboard motor, located in an aft well.

It is a Gunter rigged yawl with a boomkin for the mizzen sail.

== Operational history ==
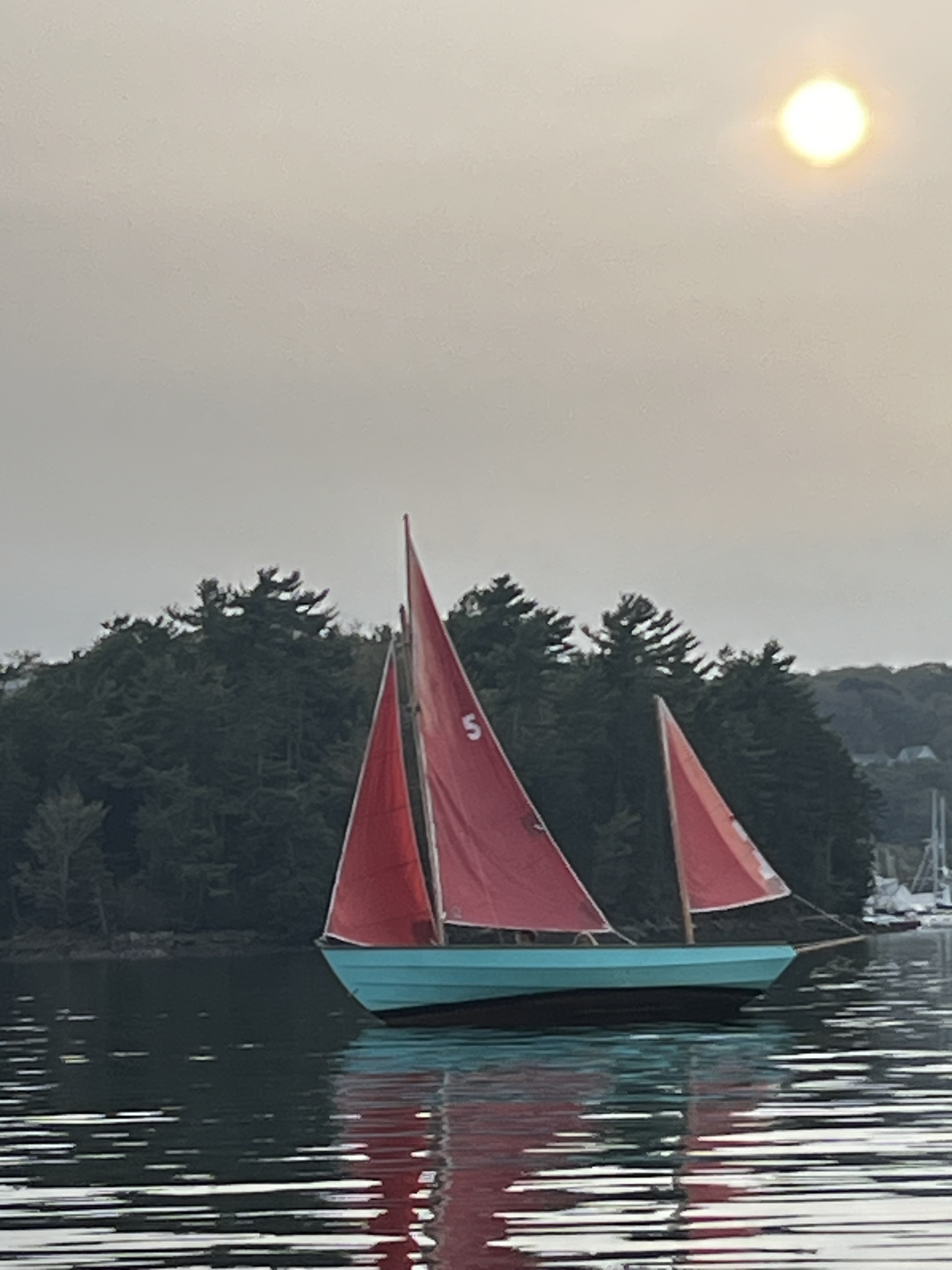
Hobbit, Drascombe Lugger, Halifax, Nova Scotia, Canada, October 2023

David Pyle and David Derrick completed a voyage from England to Australia during 1969 and 1970 in the Drascombe Lugger Hermes. The boat was a standard production model with a raised foredeck and other minor modifications built at Kelly and Hall's boatyard in Newton Ferrers, by John and Douglas Elliott.

In the early 1970s, Ken Duxbury sailed his Lugger Lugworm around Greece, and then back to the UK. He wrote three books about his experiences.

From 1978 and 1984, Webb Chiles almost completed an open boat circumnavigation of the world in his two Luggers Chidiock Tichborne I and Chidiock Tichborne II. He started the trip in California with Chidiock I and crossed the Pacific Ocean, the Indian Ocean and entered the Red Sea. In the Pacific near Vanuatu, the boat capsized in heavy weather and then drifted for two weeks, as he was unable to bail it out. After becoming damaged in the Red Sea the boat was seized by the Saudi Arabian government and Chiles was arrested on suspicion of being a spy. After being released Chiles had a new Lugger, Chiddiock II, shipped to him in Egypt and he restarted the voyage. He sailed back south to intercept his previous track and then turned towards the Suez Canal and passed into the Mediterranean Sea and into the Atlantic to La Palma in the Canary Islands. Leaving the boat there to visit Tenerife, he returned to find that the boat had capsized on her mooring during a storm. With the loss of much of his gear, Chiles decided to end his open boat circumnavigation attempt.

== Reception ==
A review in Small Boats Magazine by Audrey and Kent Lewis stated, "We think the Drascombe Lugger is one [of] the most versatile small boats ever built."

A 2008 review by John Kretschmer in Sailing Magazine, noted the boat's stability and ability to deal with high winds by reducing sail. He wrote, "Luggers have pleasant lines, with a nice sheer and comfortable seating. A bronze stemhead, wood gunwales, Sitka spruce mast and a set of belaying pins at the base of the mast give the boat a bit of a salty air." He concluded, "Should I say you really shouldn't take off to Tahiti on your Lugger? Well, you shouldn't. They are unballasted, open boats. But they come with such good manners and are endowed with so much enjoyment you may find yourself heading that way. Don't say I didn't warn you."
