= Watersail =

A watersail is a sail hung below the boom. It is used mostly on gaff rig boats for extra downwind performance when racing. Often a watersail will be improvised from an unused foresail. Its psychological effects may be more effective than its aerodynamic ones.

Because they are so low down, they do not pull as hard as you might hope, but in races they have a shattering psychological effect on the opposition. To see a long boomed gaffer overtaking from dead upwind with spinnaker on one side, and main, topsail and watersail on the other, is devastating. She seems to fill the sky, while the air for 50yds ahead of her is so still that the victim's pipe-smoke goes straight up as his yacht is inexorably overhauled.

— Cunliffe, Tom, Hand, Reef and Steer, 1992, Adlard Coles Nautical, London
