= Gaff vang =

Line putting lateral force the peak of the gaff

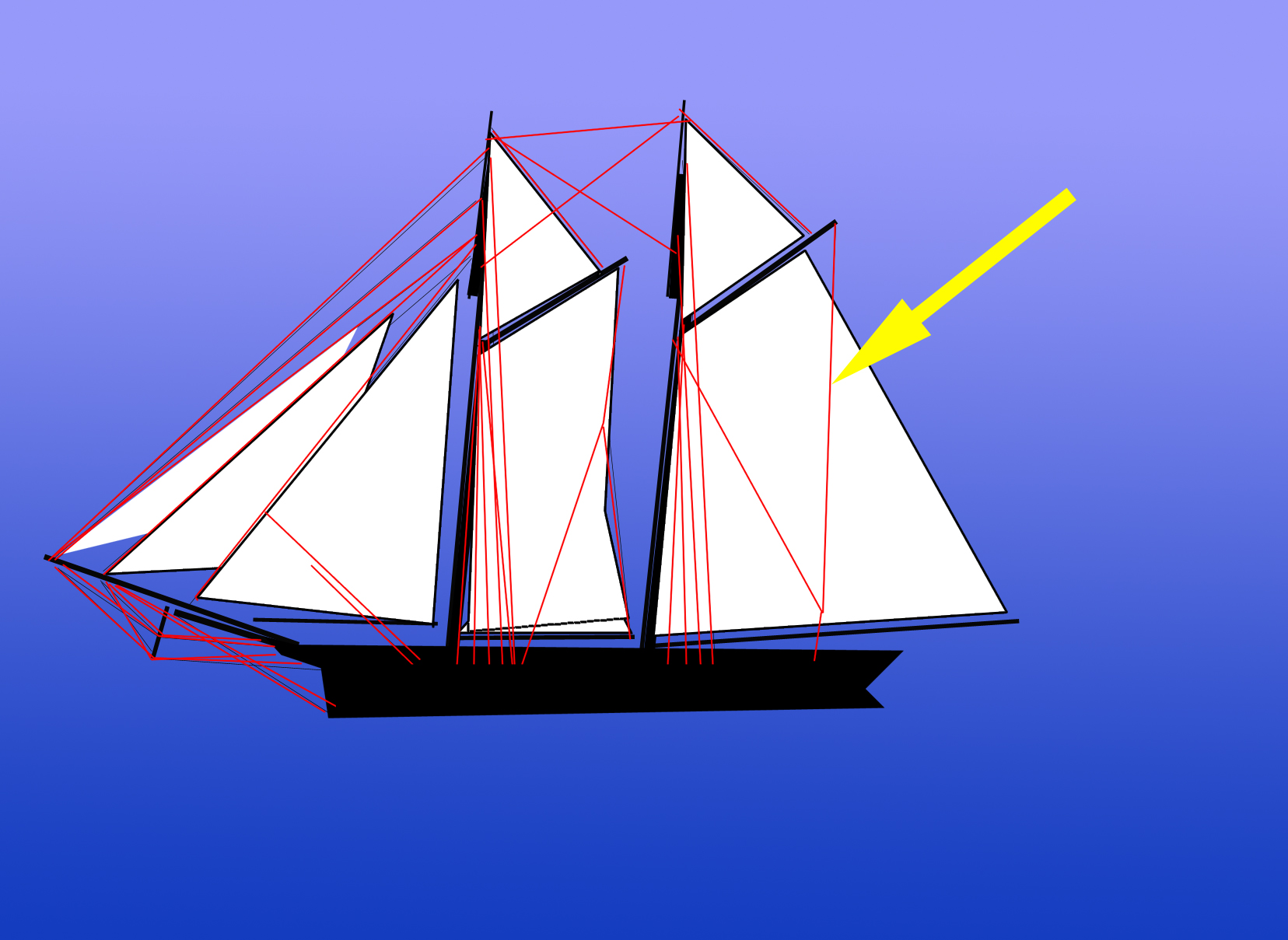
Schooner with gaff vang at yellow arrow

A gaff vang is a line on a gaff rig sailboat used to exert lateral force on the gaff and thus control the shape of the sail. Rarely used now they are commonly shown on old pictures and drawings. Typically separate port and starboard vangs were fitted. The primary purpose of the gaff vang is to reduce the twist in the sail caused by the gaff "sagging away to leeward". This sag is the main cause of the gaff rig's poor performance to windward relative to the Bermuda rig.

The gaff vang "works well on a ketch or schooner, but is often found to be unleadable on a cutter"

Another use of the gaff vangs was to steady the gaff on a boomless gaff rig like a bawley when the sail is brailed up.
