= Gunter rig =

Fore and aft sailing rig with nearly vertical upper spar

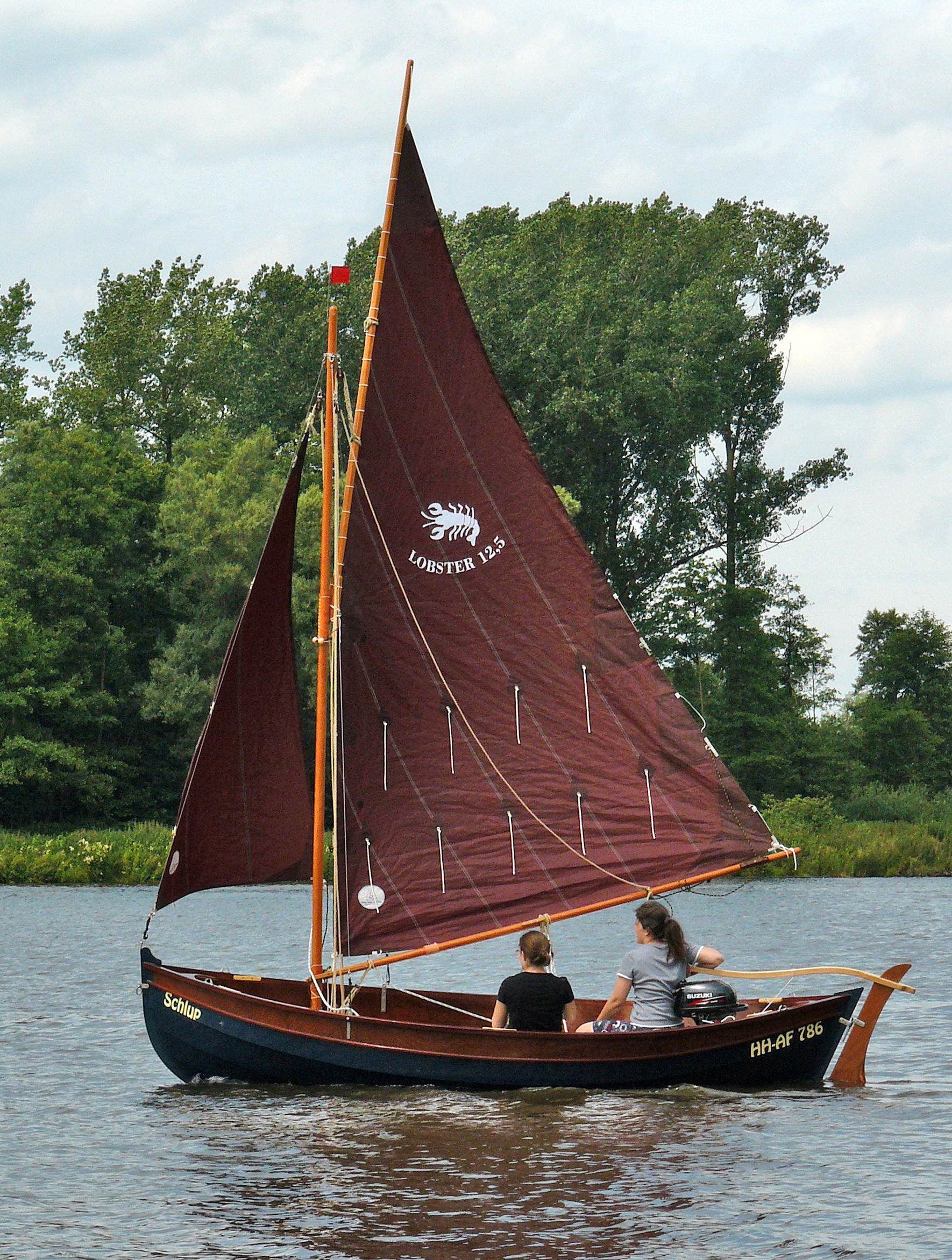
Gunter rigged Lobster 12.5

Gunter rig is a configuration of sail and spars used in sailing. It is a fore and aft sail set abaft (behind) the mast. The lower half of the luff (front) of the sail is attached to the mast, and the upper half is fastened to a spar which is approximately vertical and reaches above the top of the mast. This spar is called a "yard", but it is common for some to confuse it with a "gaff" (as in gaff rig). The overall shape of a gunter sail is roughly triangular, so having a superficial resemblance to Bermuda rig.

A gunter sail may also be called a "gunter lug" - a name which suggests developmental origins from increasing the angle of a high peaked standing lug. Gunter sails are sometimes described as "sliding gunter".

Gunter rig is generally used in small sailing craft. One important advantage is that the shorter mast used with this rig usually fits within the hull when unstepped, together with the boom and yard. This is helpful for a dinghy that is towed behind a car, stored in a garage, or used as a tender for a larger boat. The performance to windward comes close to that of Bermuda rig. Gunter rig can be found in a few working craft, but the majority of uses are in pleasure craft. (Note: An example of working craft using gunter rig is in whaleboats, particularly those from the Azores; the U.S. Navy often rigged their whaleboats with a sliding gunter.)

There are many variations of gunter rig: the most fundamental of which include whether the sail is hoisted with one or two halyards, and the ease with which reefs can be taken in.

== General characteristics ==
Gunter rig exists in several forms. In all of them, the un-reefed sail is extended above the top of the mast by the yard, giving a sail shape that is close to three sided. When the boat is not in use, this allows the mast and yard to be stored within the hull of the majority of gunter-rigged boats. Afloat, the centre of gravity of the masts and spars is lowered as the sail is reefed, unlike Bermuda rig. This is helpful to seaworthiness in rougher conditions.

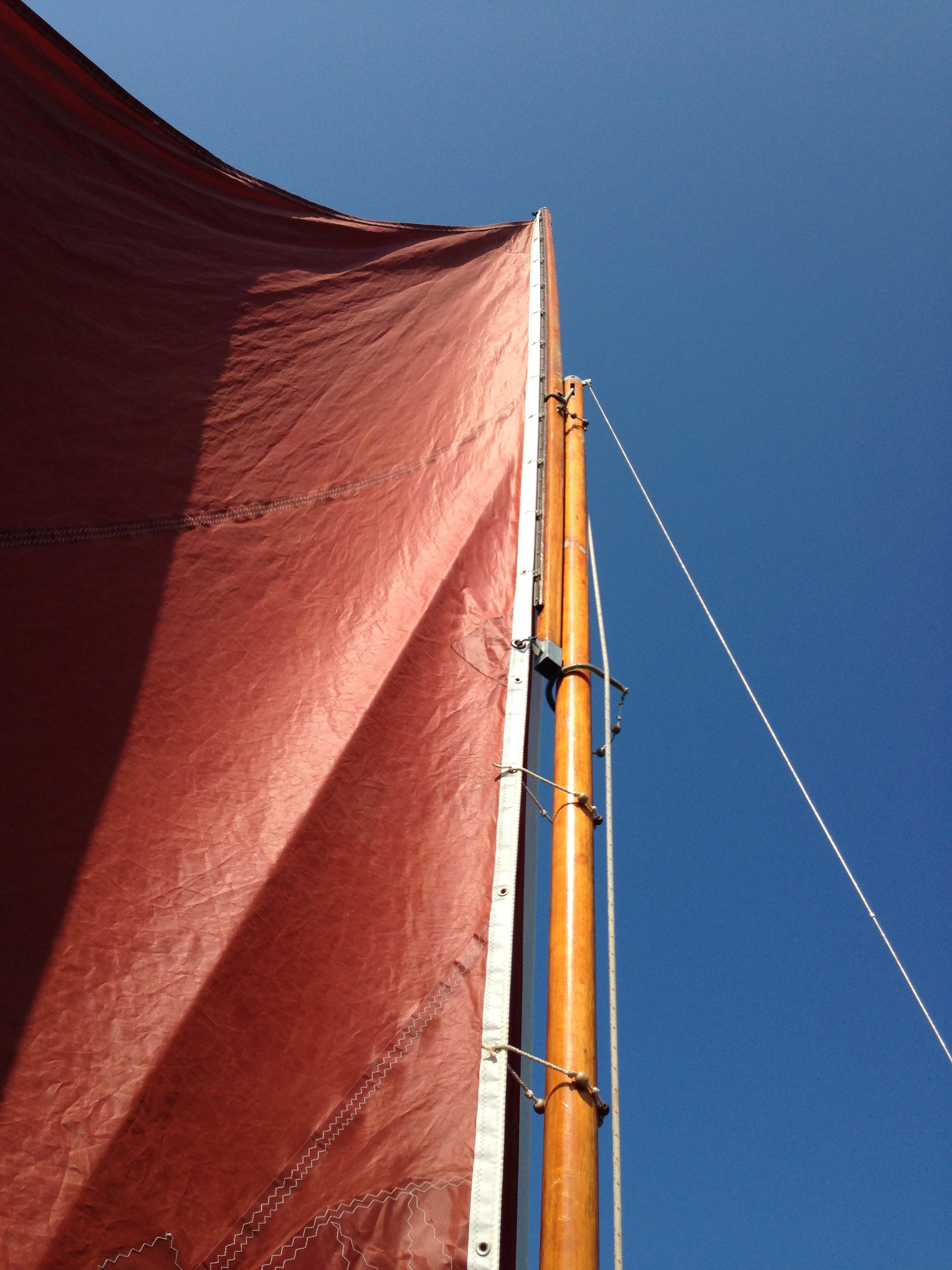
Sliding gunter sail rig on a Drascombe Lugger. In this variation, the upper gunter iron has been replaced by a parrel.

The earliest form was the sliding gunter. The yard is connected to the mast by two "gunter irons". The top iron is attached to the yard just below where the single halyard turns over the sheave at the mast-head; the lower iron is at the lower end of the yard. This arrangement keeps the yard parallel to the mast and able to slide up and down as the sail is hoisted, lowered or reefed. The benefit of this is that the yard is under better control as sail is lowered (thereby avoiding a hazard to the crew). The disadvantage is that lowering sail is a two-stage process, as the yard has to be disconnected from the top gunter iron to get all the sail off the boat. There is also a risk of the gunter irons jamming. Some of these problems are resolved if the sail is boomless or loose-footed and can be taken in with brails.

A two halyard system does away with the gunter irons. The peak halyard goes to a wire span on the yard and holds the yard close to the mast. A throat halyard moves the yard up and down the mast. The lower end of the yard is usually attached to the mast with jaws and a parrel. This allows the rig to be put together with more readily available components. In use, the sail can be lowered completely quite quickly. Reefing is carried out by lowering away solely on the throat halyard. Unlike gaff rig, this two halyard system is easier for a single-hander, as only one halyard is used at a time.

A simpler and more minimalist arrangement is to have a single halyard that is tied to the yard at a mid-point.This attachment point has to be varied if the sail is reefed, so reefing can only be done by completely lowering the sail, moving position of the halyard and re-hoisting once the reef points are tied.

== See also ==
- Gaff rig
- Sail plan
