= Gaff rig =

Sailing rig configuration

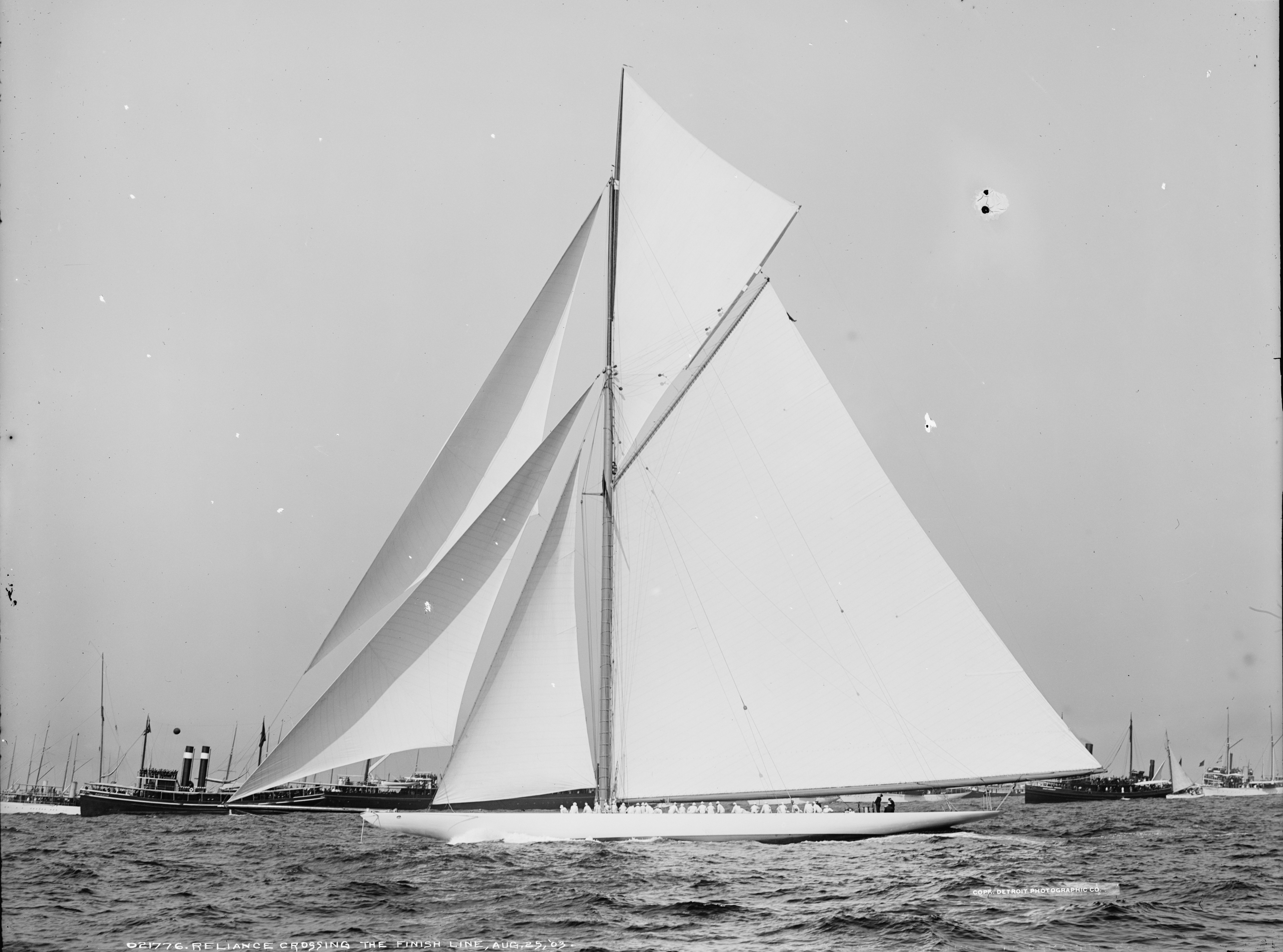
Reliance, a competitor in the 1903 America's Cup and the largest gaff-rigged cutter ever built

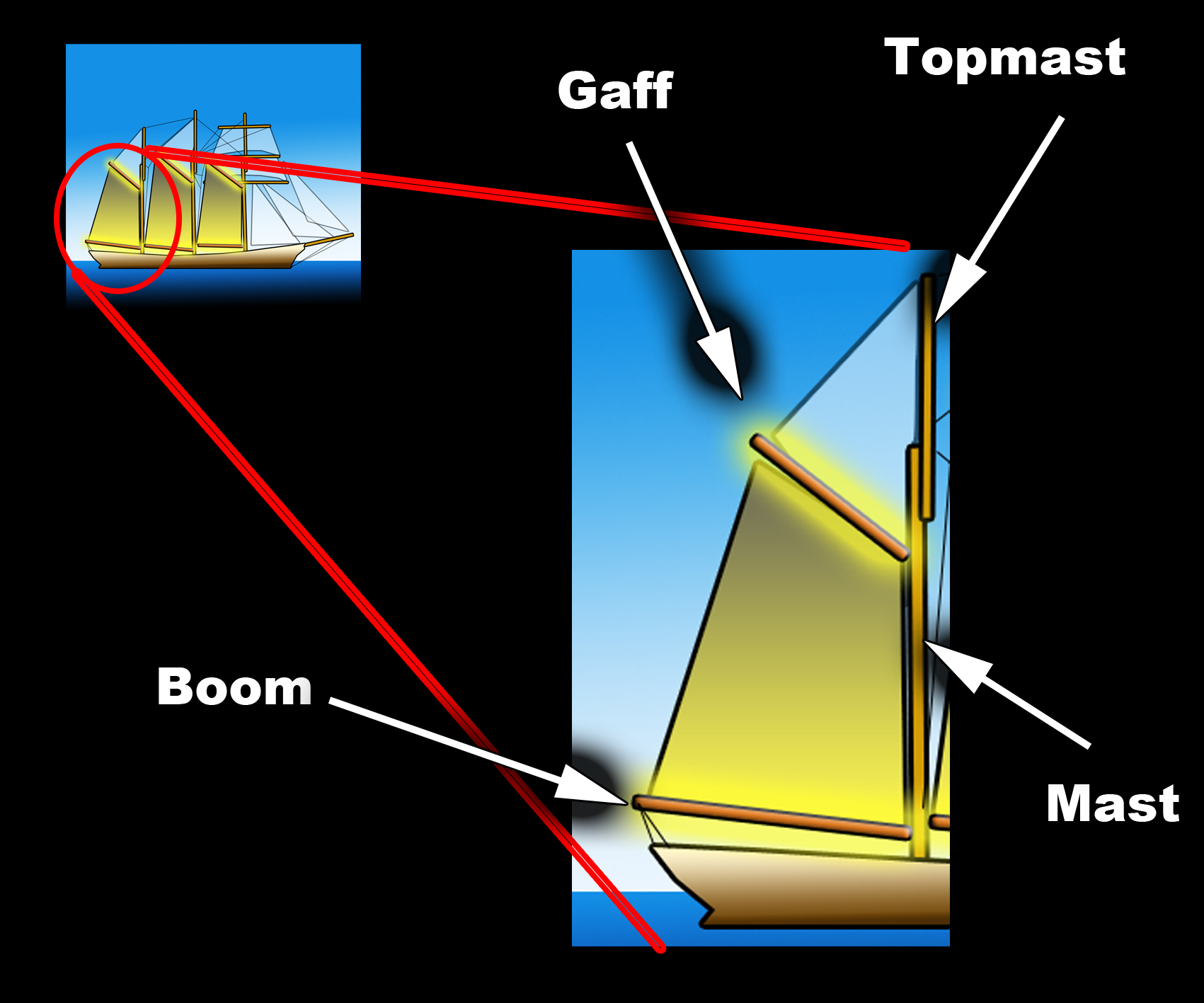
A gaff-rigged sail and its surrounding spars

Gaff sail -: 1. Mast; 2. Gaff; 3. Peak; 4. Throat; 5. Boom; 6. Clew; 7. Tack; 8. Saddle; 9. Parrel; 10. Sail; 11. Bridle; 12. Peak Halyard; 13. Throat Halyard

Gaff rig is a sailing rig (configuration of sails, mast and stays) in which the sail is four-cornered, fore-and-aft rigged, controlled at its peak and, usually, its entire head by a spar (pole) called the gaff. Because of the size and shape of the sail, a gaff rig will have running backstays rather than permanent backstays.

The gaff enables a fore-and-aft sail to be four-sided, rather than triangular. A gaff rig typically carries 25 percent more sail than an equivalent Bermuda rig for a given hull design.

A sail hoisted from a gaff is called a gaff-rigged sail.

== Description ==
Gaff rig remains the most popular fore-aft rig for schooner and barquentine mainsails and other course sails, and spanker sails on a square rigged vessel are always gaff-rigged. On other rigs, particularly the sloop, ketch and yawl, gaff-rigged sails were once common but have now been largely replaced by the Bermuda rig sail, which, in addition to being simpler than the gaff rig, usually allows vessels to sail closer to the direction from which the wind is blowing (i.e. "closer to the wind").

The gaff is hoisted by two halyards:

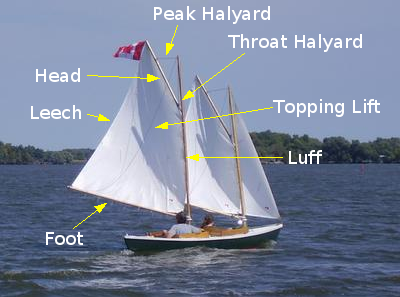
Halyards (and edges) on a gaff rigged sail

- The throat halyard hoists the throat of the sail (the end closer to the mast) at the forward end of the gaff and bears the main weight of the sail and the tension of the luff.
- The peak halyard lifts the aft end of the gaff and bears the leech tension. Small craft attach the peak halyard to the gaff with a wire span with eyes at both ends looped around the gaff and held in place with small wooden chocks; larger craft have more than one span. Peak halyards pull upwards, approaching the gaff at right angles.

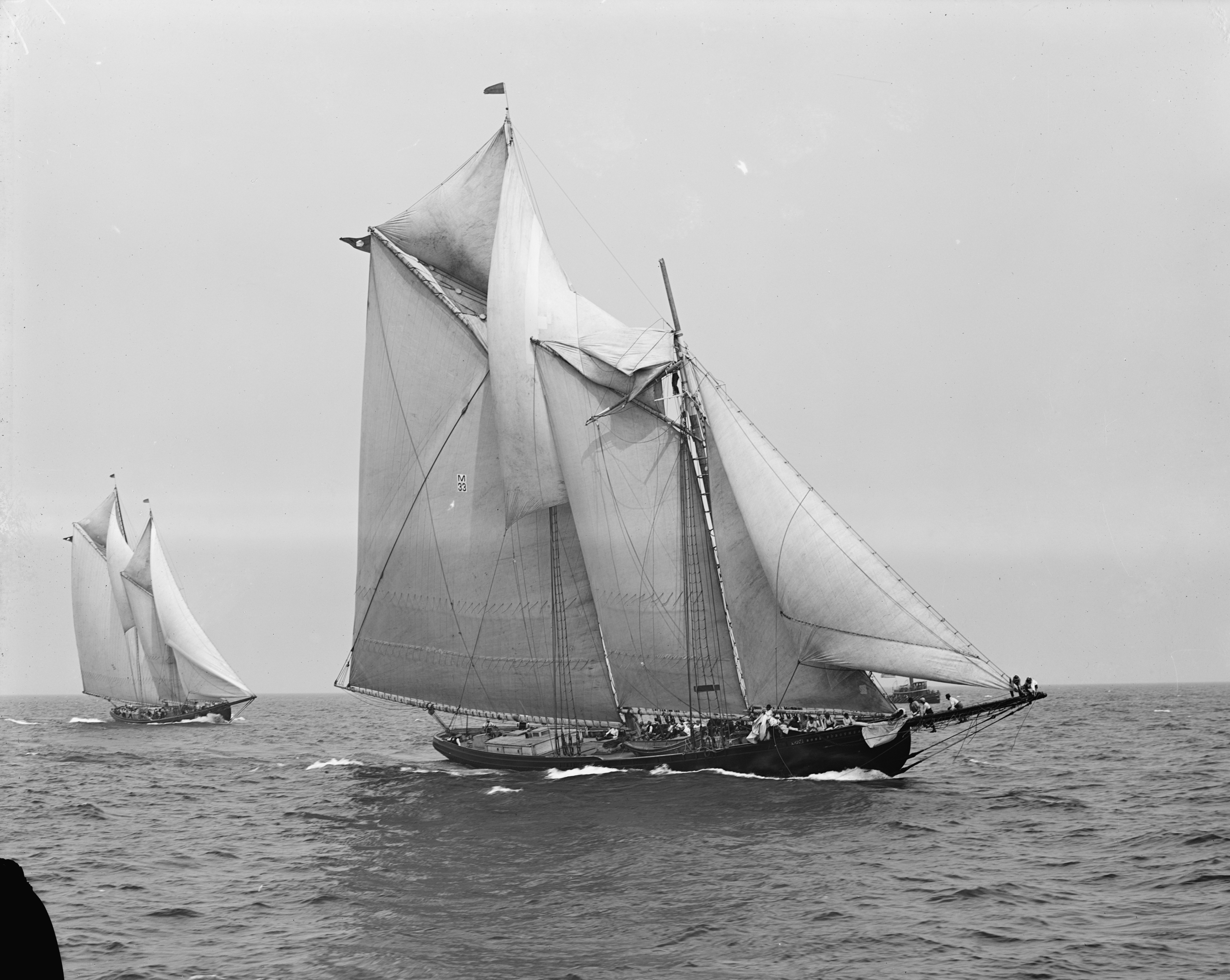
The gaff-rigged schooner Rose Dorothea won the 1907 Lipton's Cup, despite a broken foretopmast (pictured)

Additionally, a gaff vang may be fitted. It is a line attached to the end of the gaff which prevents the gaff from sagging downwind. Gaff vangs are difficult to rig on the aft-most sail, so are typically only found on schooners or ketches, and then only on the foresail or mainsail.

A triangular fore-and-aft sail called a jib-headed topsail may be carried between the gaff and the mast.

Gunter-rigged boats are similar, smaller vessels on which a spar (commonly, but incorrectly called the gaff) is raised until it is nearly vertical, parallel to the mast and close adjacent to it. Topsails are never carried on gunter rigs.

The spritsail is another rig with a four-sided fore-aft sail. Unlike the gaff rig where the head hangs from a spar along its edge, this rig supports the leech of the sail by means of a spar named a sprit. The forward end of the sprit is attached to the mast but bisects the face of the sail, with the after end of the sprit attaching to the peak and/or the clew of the sail.

== Sailing characteristics (small craft) ==
For a given sail area a gaff rig has a shorter mast than a Bermudan rig. In short-ended craft with full body, heavy displacement and moderate ballast ratio, it is difficult to set enough sail area in the Bermudan rig without a mast of excessive height and a centre of effort (CE) too high for the limited stability of the hull. Because of its low aspect ratio, the gaff rig is less prone to stalling if oversheeted than something taller and narrower.

=== Reaching with gaff sails ===
Whilst reaching, the CE being set further back, will encourage a small craft to bear up into the wind, i.e. strong weather helm. The boat builder can compensate for this at design stage, e.g. by shifting the keel slightly aft, or having two jibs to counter the effect. The gaff-cutter is in fact a very popular sailplan for small craft. The helmsman can reduce weather helm significantly, simply by sheeting out the mainsail. Sheeting out may appear to create an inefficient belly in the sail, but it is often a pragmatic alternative to having a heavy helm. A swing keel lifted halfway is the perfect treatment for weather helm on a gaffer. The usual adjustments to mast rake, or even bowsprit length may be made to a gaffer with persistent heavy weather (or lee) helm.

=== Running with gaff sails ===
On a gaff-rigged vessel, any heading where the wind is within 20 degrees of dead aft is considered a run. When running with a gaff rig, the CE of the mainsail may actually be overboard of the hull, in a stiff wind the craft may want to broach. Running goose winged with a balloon staysail poled out to windward will balance the CE; Nick Skeates circumnavigated Wylo II with this configuration. In light winds, or when racing, a watersail may also be set.

== Gaffers Day ==
Since 1972, the Sydney Amateur Sailing Club has regularly hosted a Gaffers Day for any classic sailing boat that can "hoist a spar". Up to 90 vessels from around Australia take part in sailing on Sydney Harbour in a practical demonstration of the skills and technology used in the nautical past.

== Gallery ==
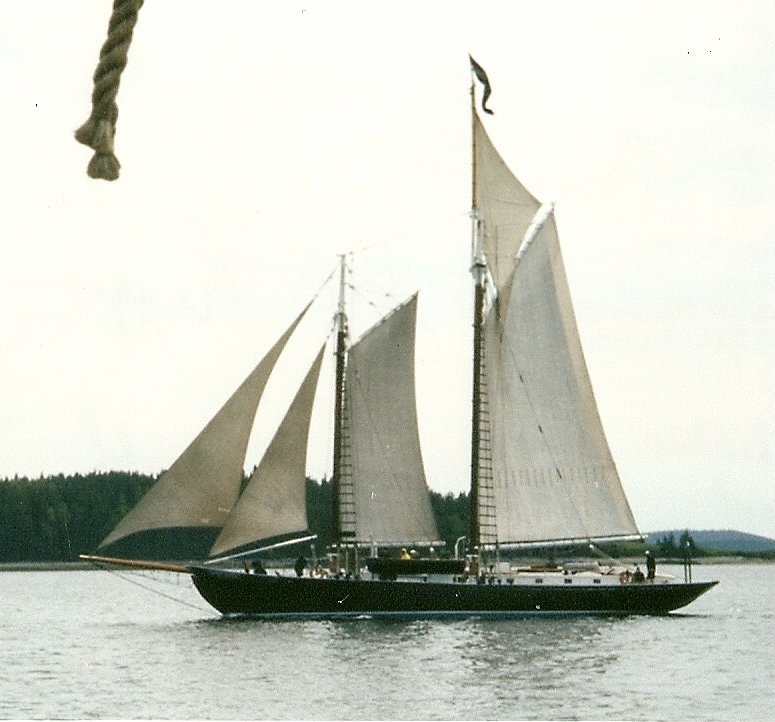
Gaff rigged schooner J. & E. Riggin. Her sails, from left to right, are: jib, staysail, gaff foresail, gaff mainsail, and, above that, a main gaff topsail

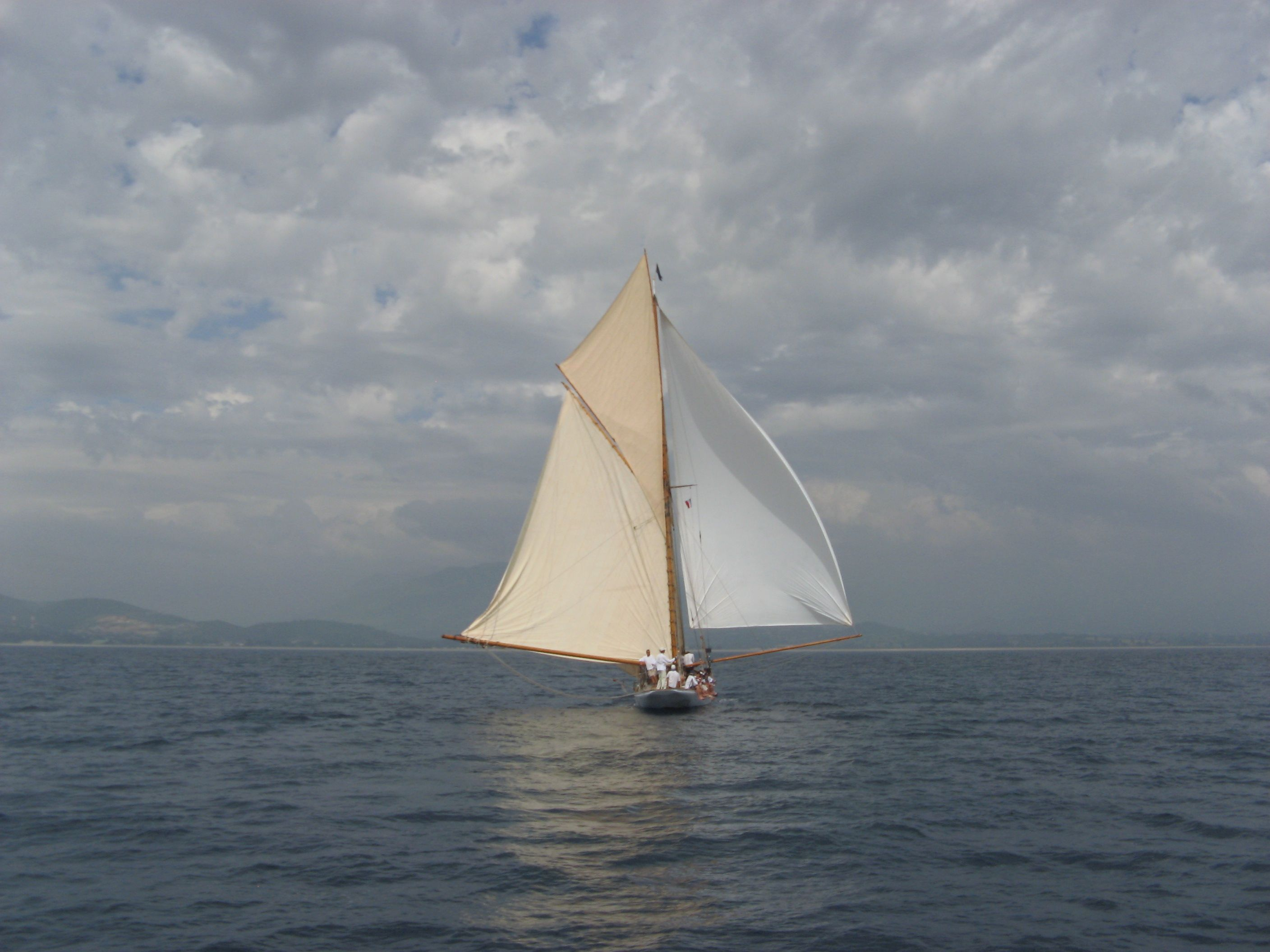
Gaff rigged Cutter Partridge 1885

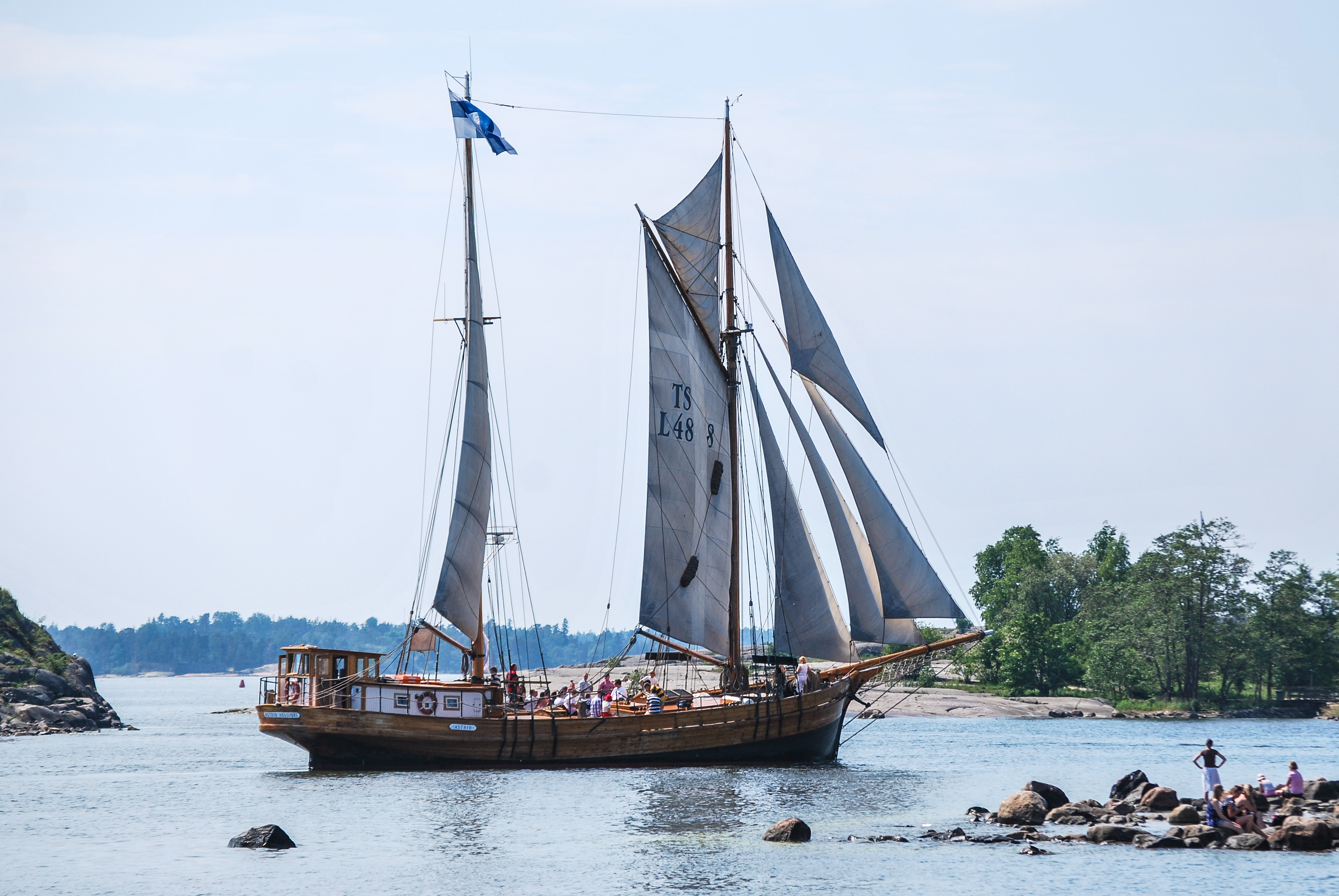
Gaff rigged ketch, Astrid, off Helsinki, Finland

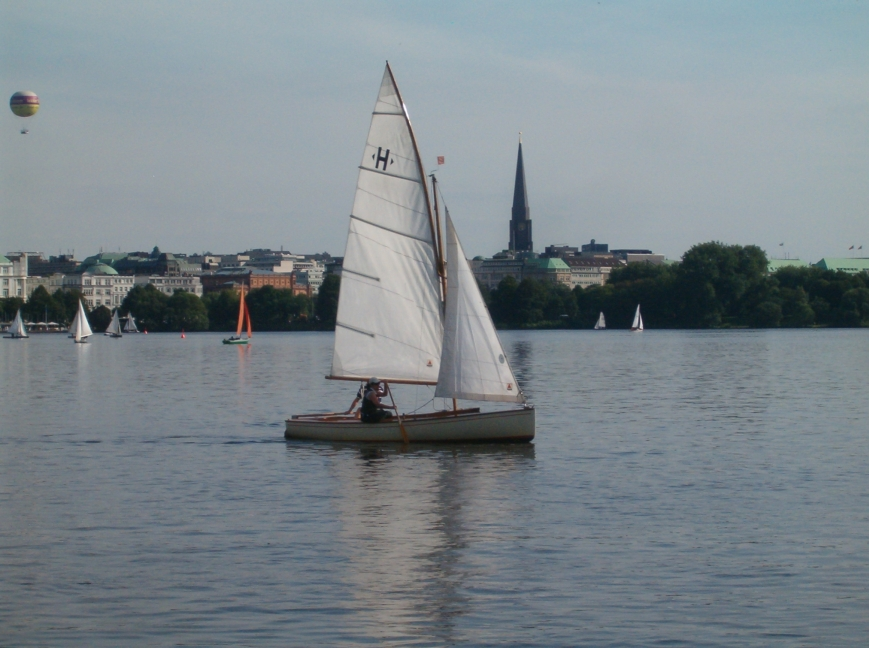
A near-vertical gaff allows this Gunter-rigged boat to carry a triangular sail that is similar to the Bermuda rig

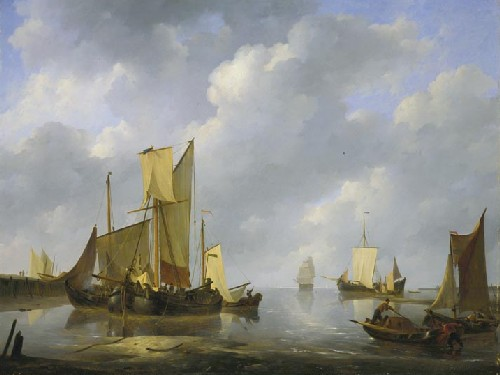
Gaffelaar, by Johannes Christiaan Schotel, depicting both gaff and square-rigged boats

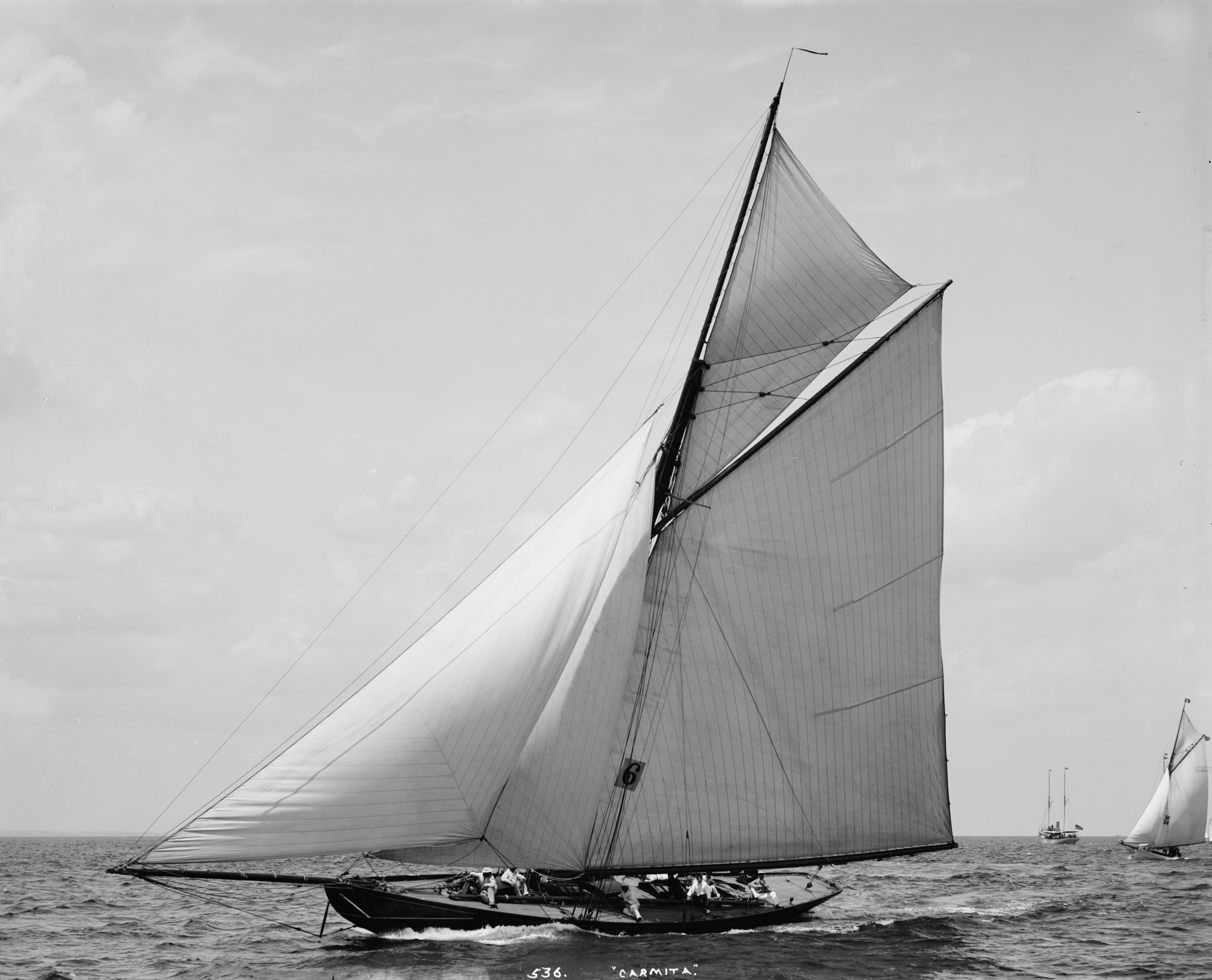
Carmita, racing cutter

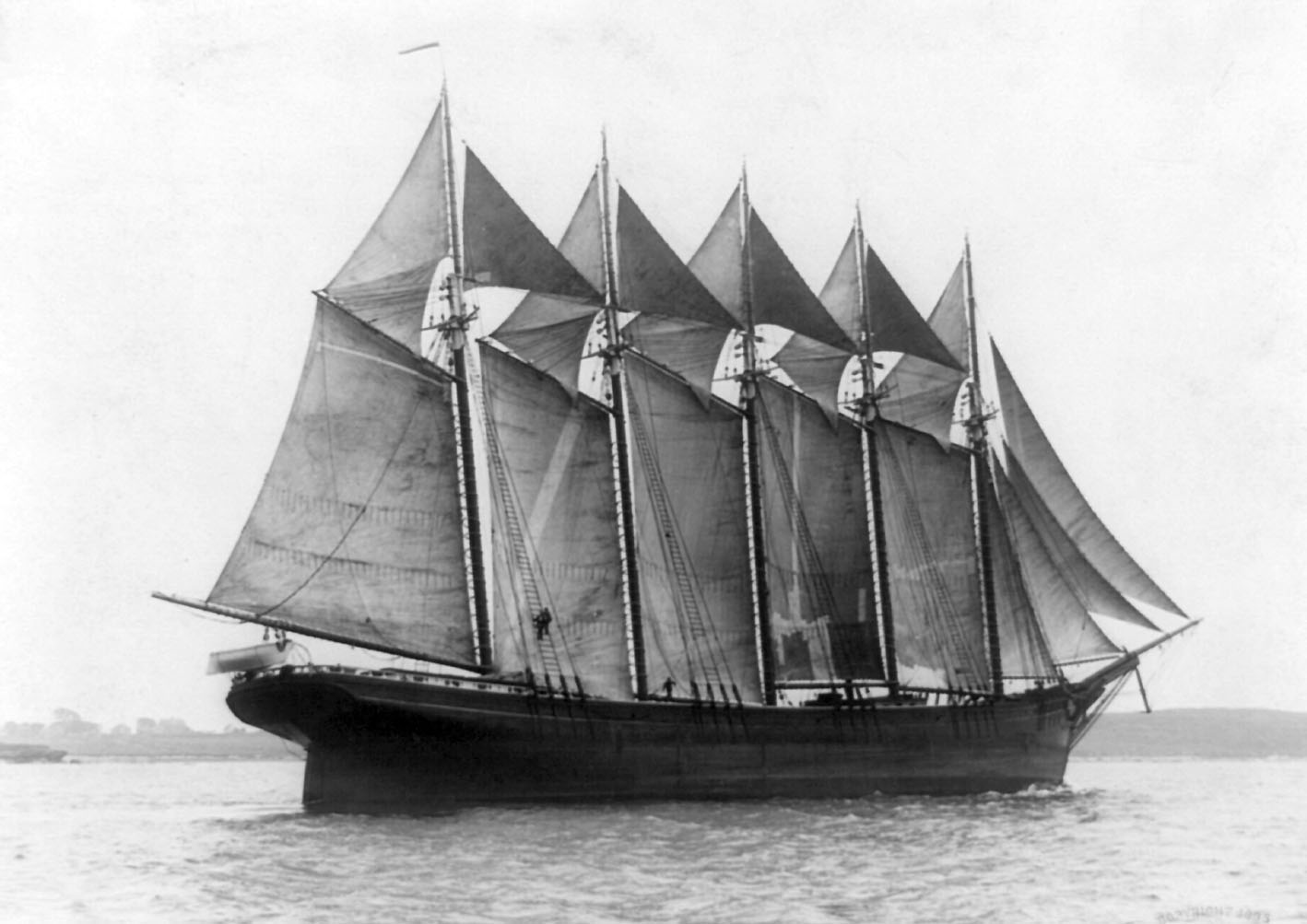
Governor Ames, five-masted schooner

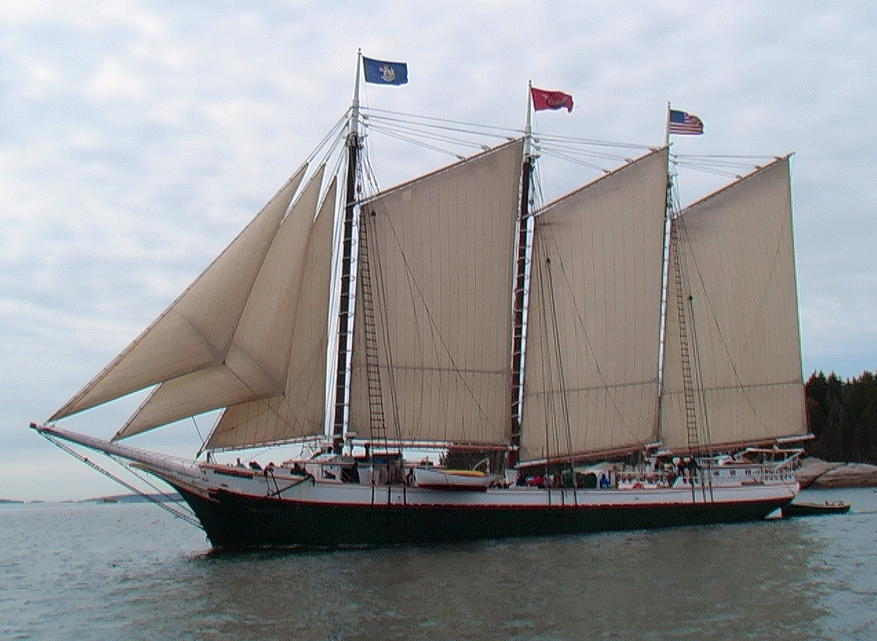
Victory Chimes, National Historic Landmark

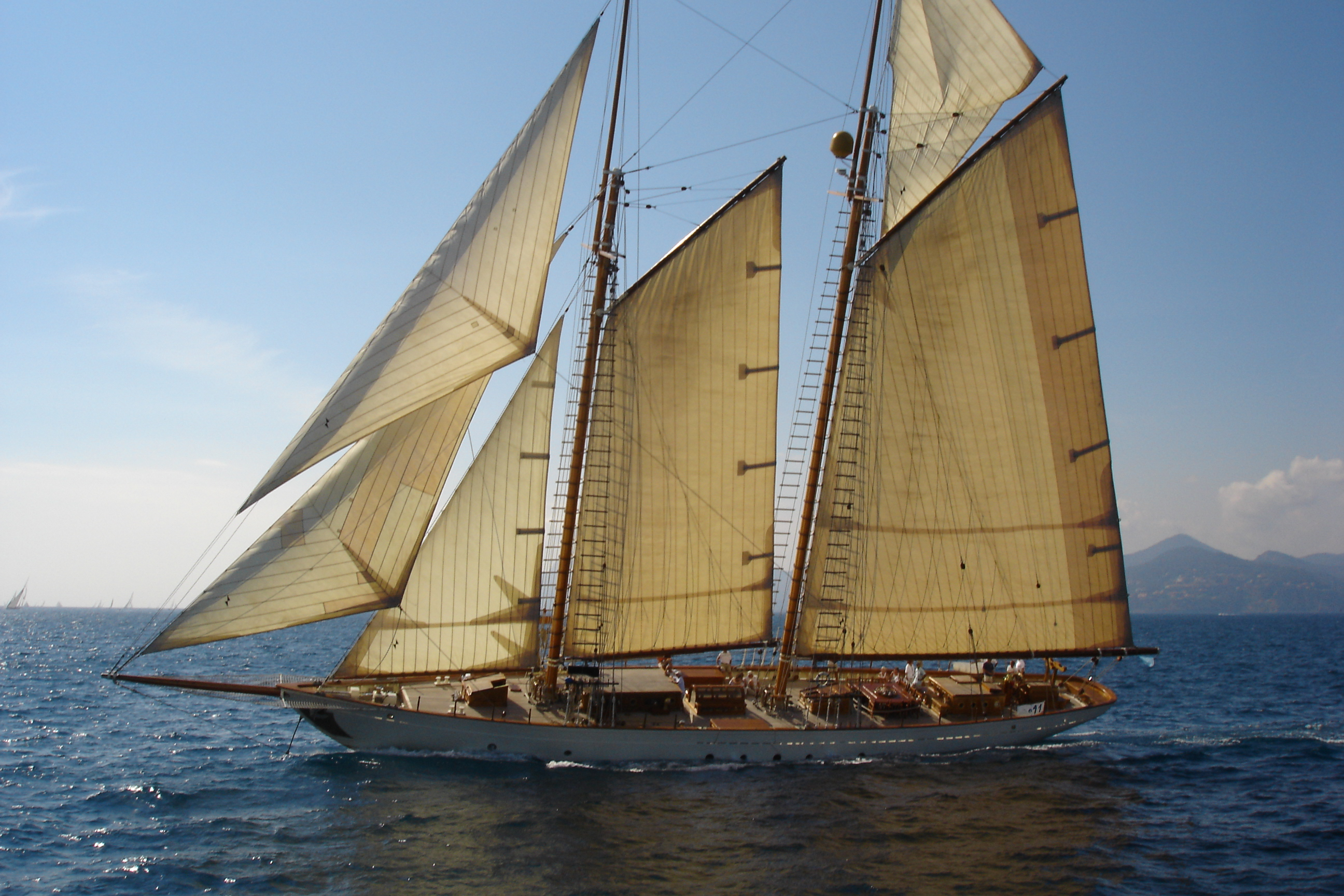
Zaca, owned by Errol Flynn

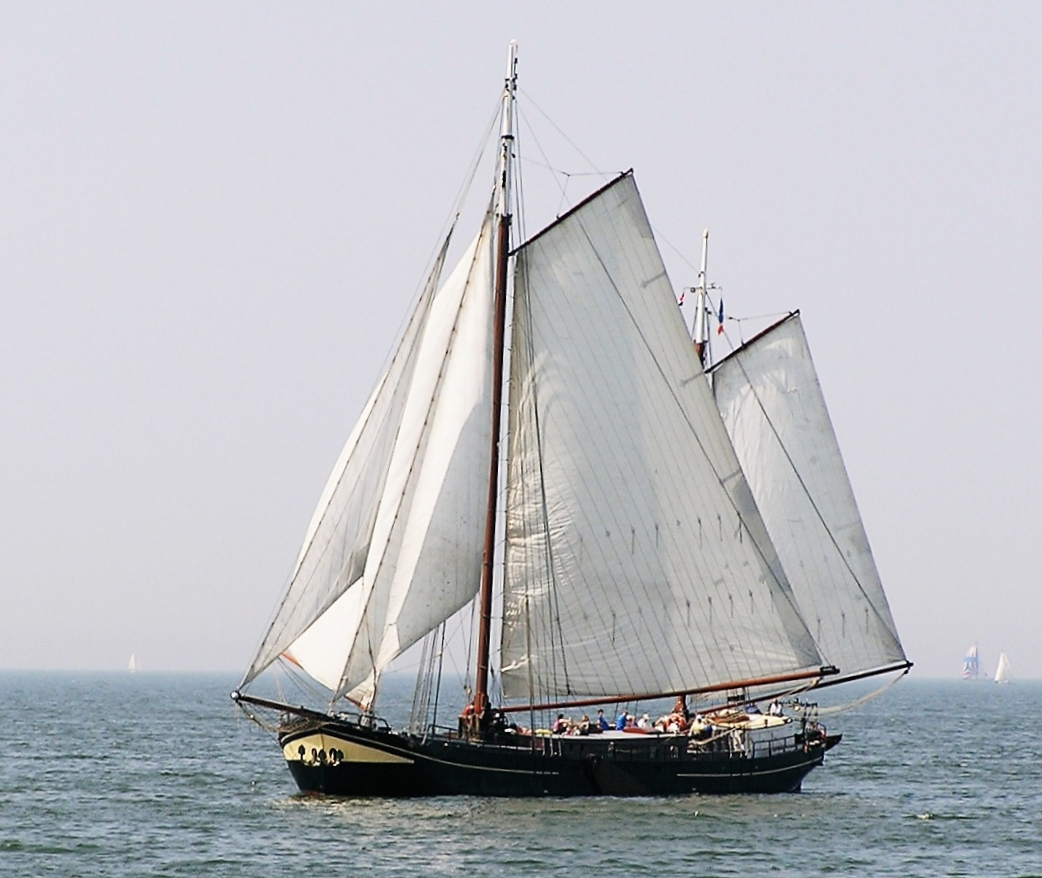
Traditional Dutch sailing barge

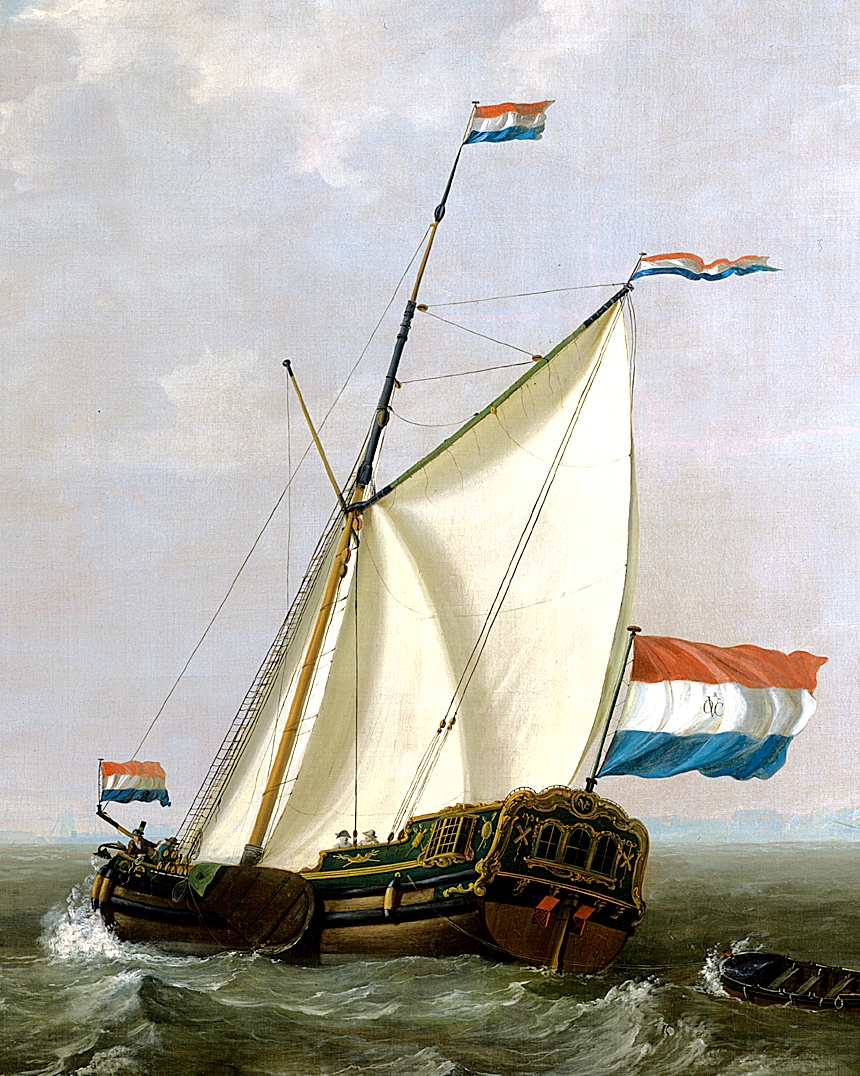
The yacht of the VOC-Chamber of Rotterdam, by Jacob van Strij

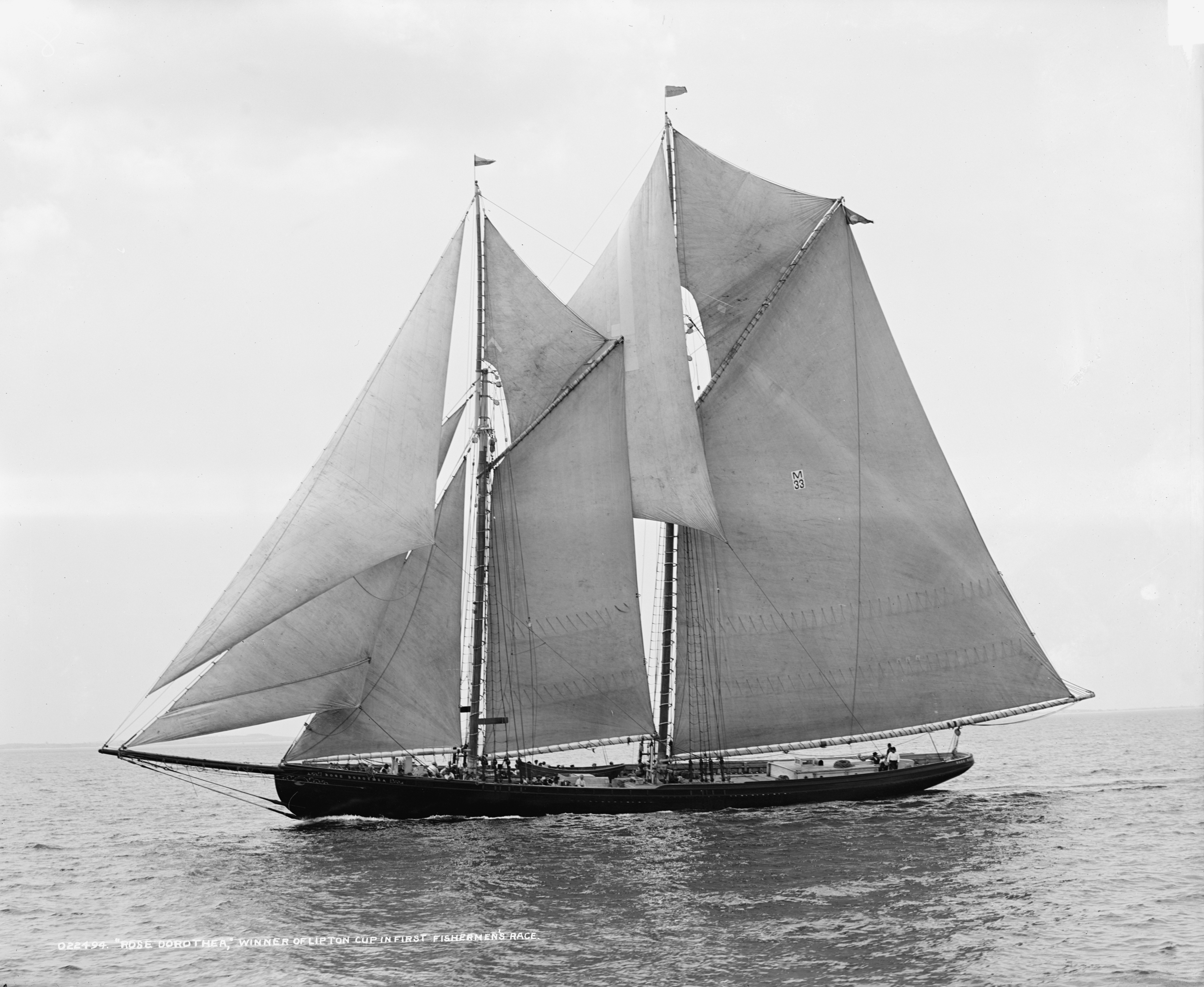
The schooner Rose Dorothea in 1907

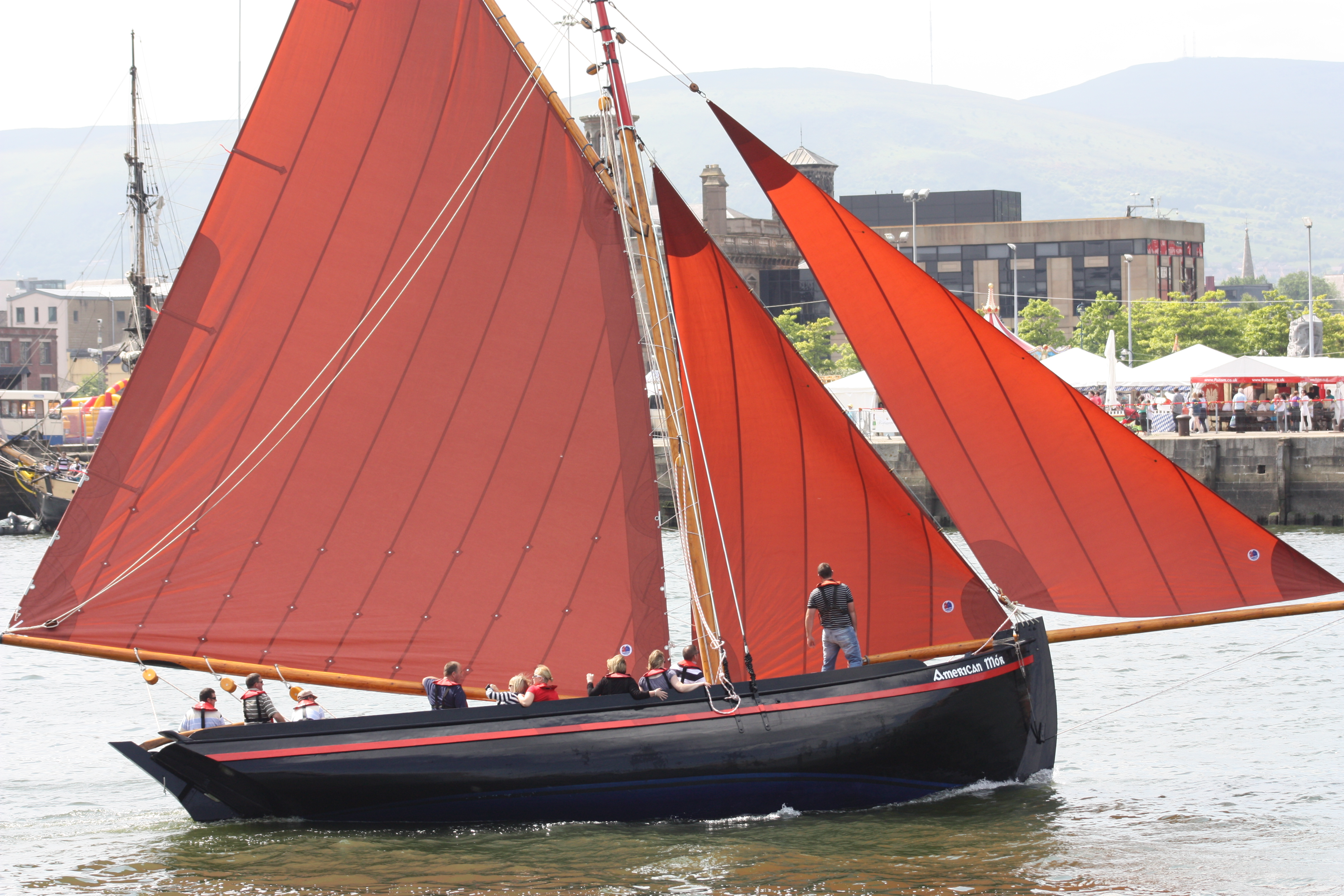
Traditional Galway hooker, Ireland, June 2010

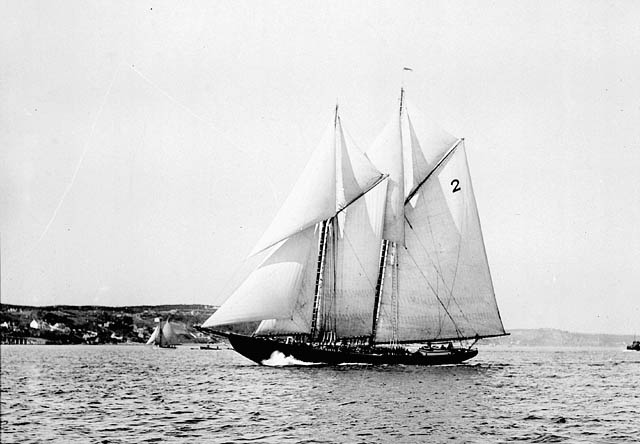
Original iconic Canadian schooner Bluenose

== See also ==
- Gunter rig
- Parts of a sail
- Spritsail
- Lug sail
