= Pinas (ship) =

Type of schooner

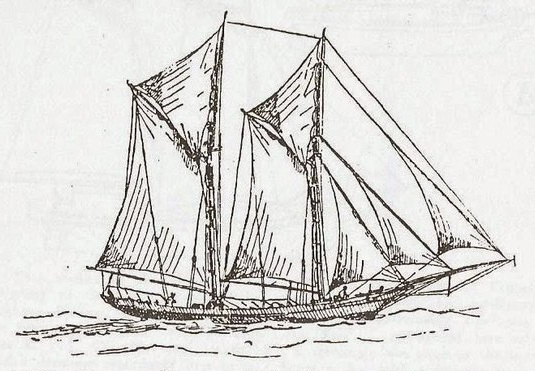
The original pinas was rigged with European fore-and-aft rig.

The pinas, sometimes called "pinis" as well, is a type of schooner of the east coast of the Malay peninsula, built in the Terengganu area. This kind of vessel was built of Chengal wood by the Malays since the 19th century and roamed the South China Sea and adjacent oceans as one of the two types of traditional sailing vessels the late Malay maritime culture has developed: The bedar and the pinas.

== Description ==
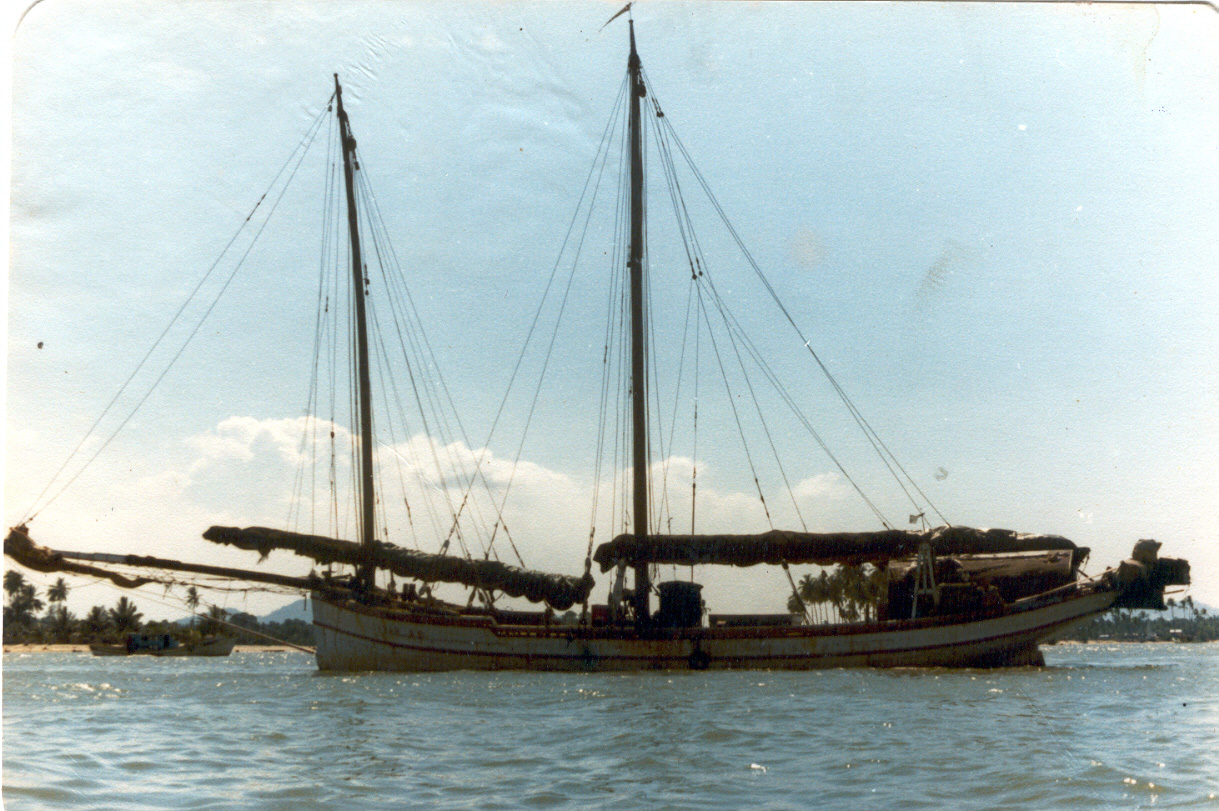
The pinas Sabar, (26.5 m LOD), the last original sailing pinas of Kuala Terengganu, 1980

The pinas is a sailing vessel built exclusively in the kuala (Malay: rivermouth) of the Terengganu river. It was the largest of the ships built in the area, and was only used for deep sea navigation to distant ports. The pinas carried two masts, one in the bow, called "Topan", slightly raked forward, and the main mast, called "Agung" placed a bit forward of the center of the boat. The pinas had a very long bowsprit, slightly bent downwards by the bobstay.

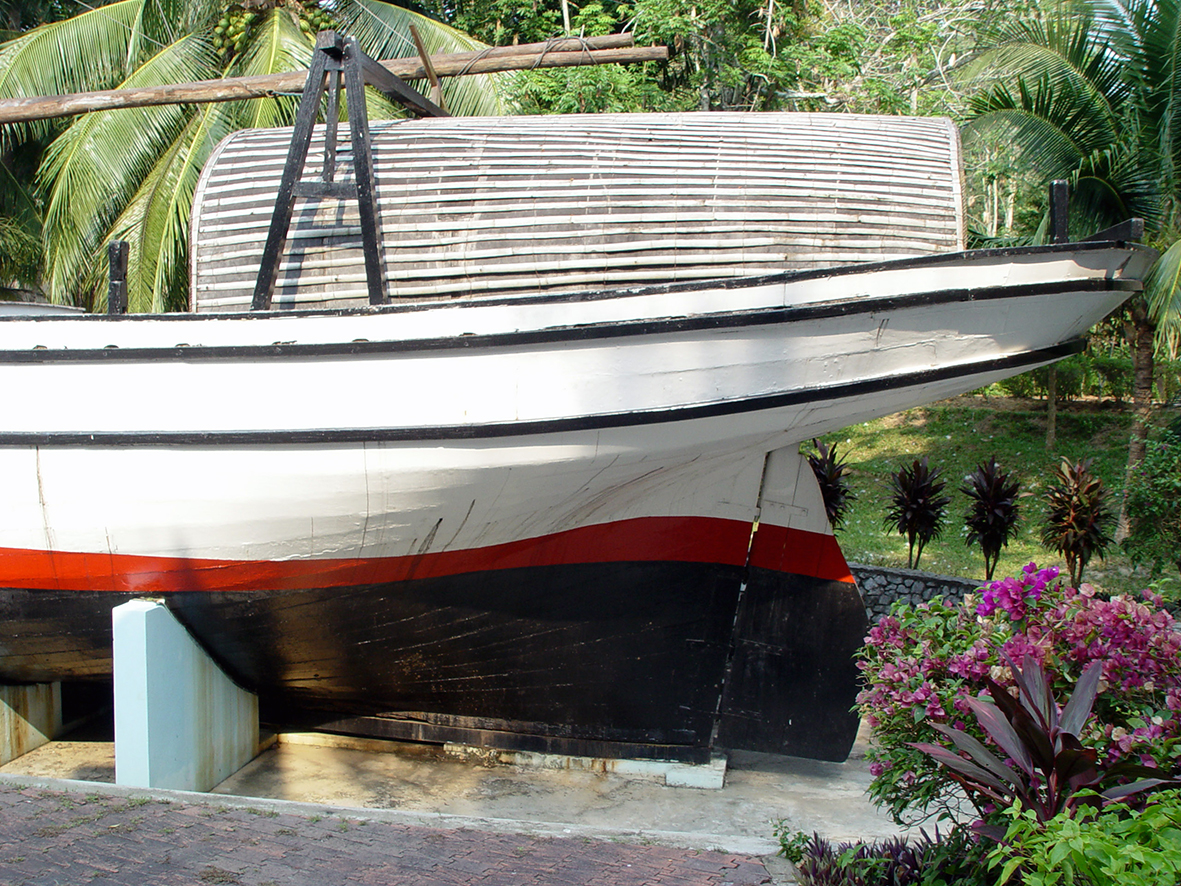
The pinas Sabar in the museum of Kuala Terengganu, 1998

The original pinas was schooner-rigged with Bermuda topsails. This type was recorded by Herbert Warington Smyth in 1906.

After the 20th century, the masts carried a fully battened lug or "junk"-sail. These sails were not made of cloth but of a matting material called "tikal" that is also used for floor matting and other purposes. Like most junk sails the battens were made of bamboo, usually creating six individual panels to the sail. The halyard was attached almost in the middle of the yard, and since the luff of the sail was nearly straight and only about half the length of the markedly convex leach, the yard, when hoisted, was sitting in an angle of about 15° – 20° with the vertical.

The foresail was set on the port side of the Topan and the mainsail on the starboard side of the Agung. A relatively small jib was set on the very long bowsprit. All pinas, even the big ones of 80 feet and above were steered by a tiller with a pulley block system easing the strain on a conventional rudder hinged on the stern post. This tiller was operated from within a round cabin (cup) placed on the stern of the boat. This cabin was housing the accommodation of the crew as well. The hold was reserved for the cargo.

These boats sailed best with the wind on the quarter or just aft of the beam. Since the sails are fully battened and may be set almost at a right angle to the boat, they were able to set the Topan sail to windward, sailing wing to wing as soon as the wind was well aft of the beam. Going to windward was not the strong point of those junk rigged vessels, since the junk rig performs not as efficiently to windward as the modern Bermuda sail or the Gaff sail and the hulls of the cargo freighters were well rounded and offered not much lateral resistance.

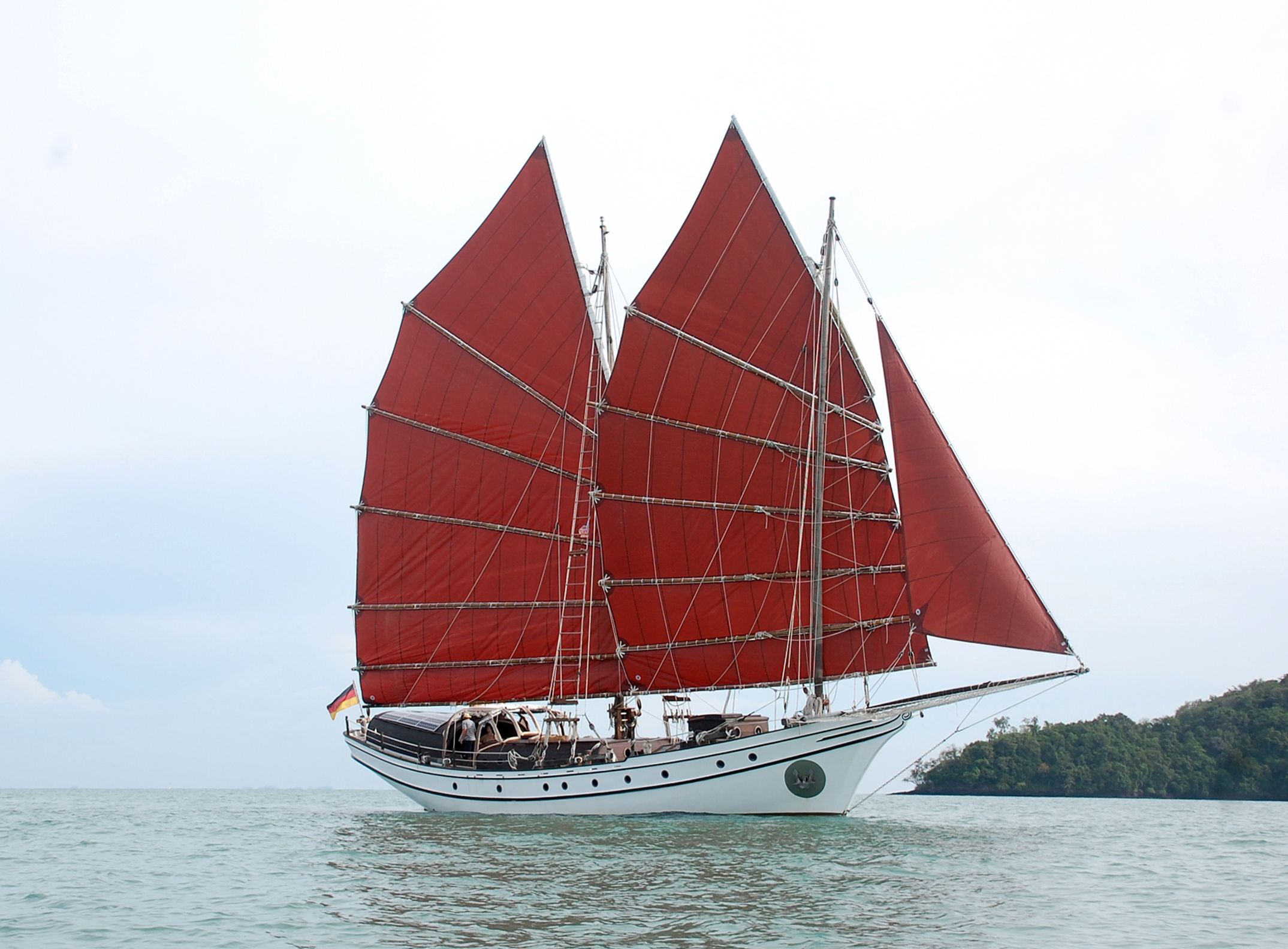
The Naga Pelangi, a 22 m (LOD) pinas built in 2009 on Pulau Duyong, sailing in Langkawi 2010

The clipper type bow of the pinas often carried a carved figurehead called "Gobel" and the transom stern was raked aft and reached pretty high up above the waterline. The pinas had a well defined sheer and was a seaworthy vessel.

The hull of the pinas is influenced by European boats of the early nineteenth century or later, and might well be a copy of the East Indiamen of the middle of the 19th century. The locals say that a Frenchman whose boat was wrecked on the shore of Terengganu in the 19th century settled there and his knowledge is said to have influenced the boatbuilding of the shipwrights.

The word pinas, locally pronounced almost sounds like penis, is obviously derived from the French word pinasse, which describes a small, usually two-masted sailing vessel. The English word pinnace, a man-of-war's tender, is a deduction from the French word.

These boats are also called Perahu (Malay: boat) pinas Golok, to distinguish them from other types built with a straight stem and without a beak (figurehead) the pinas Dogar. Golok, (Malay: cleaver/machete) or sword with a convex cutting edge, refers to the curved, clipper like bow.

== Building technique ==
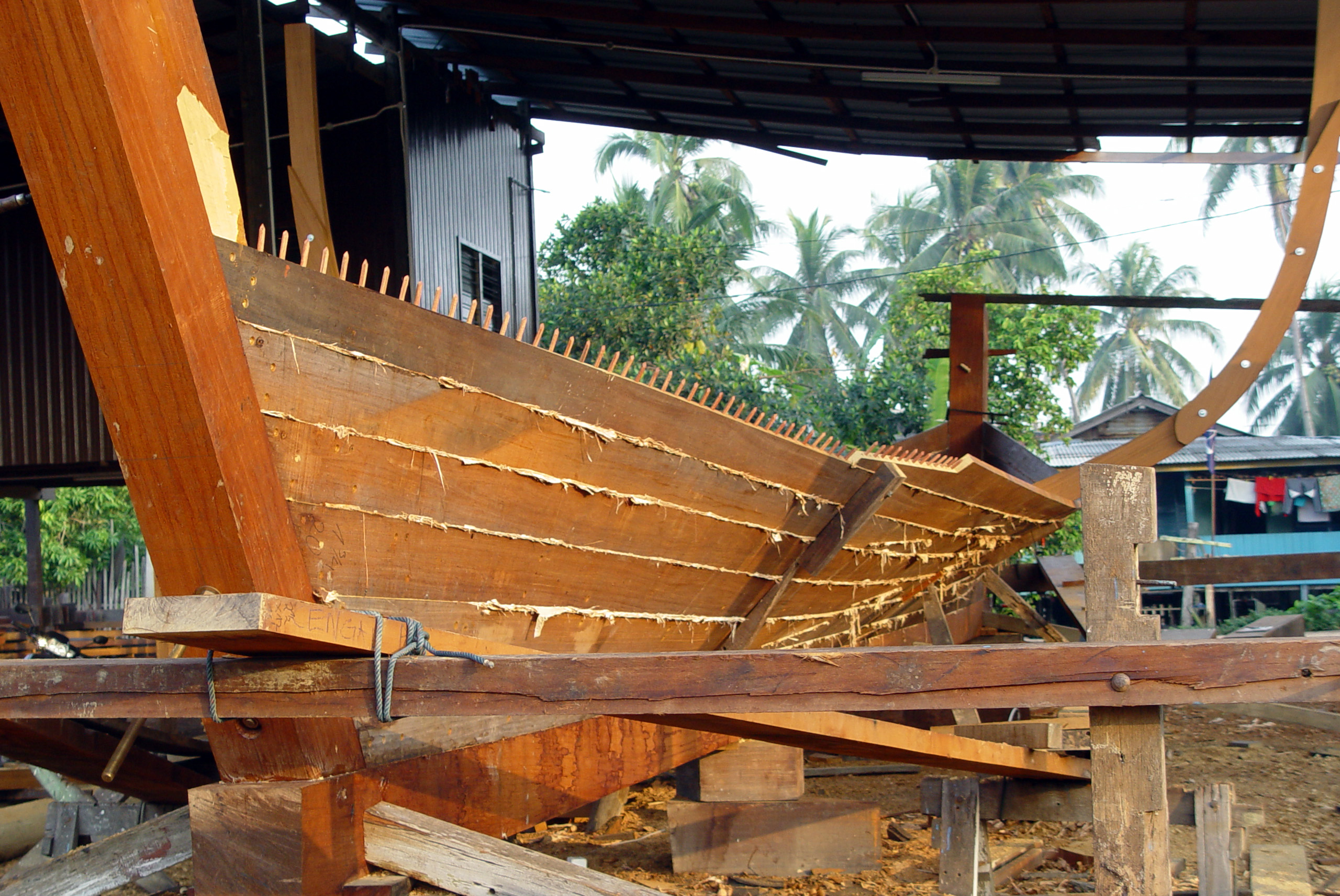
The building of a traditional Malay pinas with the frames inserted later, Terengganu, 2004

The pinas boats of Terengganu are built using the indigenous technique the Malays have developed to build wooden boats. They build without plans, hull first, frames later. The planks are fire bent and joined edge on edge (carvel) using "basok" (wooden dowels) made from Penaga-ironwood (Mesua ferrea). There is no European style caulking hammered into a groove between the planks: Before the new plank is hammered home, a strip of kulit gelam (Malay: paperbarks skin) of the Melaleuca species is placed over the dowels. This 1–2 mm layer of a natural material has remarkable sealing properties.

== History ==
The tradition of building wooden boats in modern Malaysia reaches far back in time: For overseas trade, for fishing, for piracy, for travelling up the many rivers, for each purpose they developed a special design.

A conceivable anecdote of the origin of both the name and type of ship is based on a report by R.S. Ross, then master of the British East India Company's steamer Phlegeton, who on the occasion a visit to Kuala Terengganu, Malaysia, in 1846 witnessed a schooner built locally by "some of the natives [who] had learnt the art of shipbuilding at Singapore, and [were] assisted by Chinese carpenters", that is speculated to have become the archetype for the Terengganu perahu pinas or pinis. Malay traditions allege that this schooner was built on behalf of Baginda Omar, the Sultan of Terengganu (reigned 1839–1876), possibly either under direction or with considerable help by a German or French beachcomber who had "reached Terengganu, by way of Malacca and Singapore, in search of "opium cum dignitate", to become the archetype of the 'Malay schooner': The Terengganu pinas/pinis, today carrying batten-lug sails, until the turn to the 20th century was commonly rigged as a gaff-ketch.

The two perahu besar (Malay: big boat) of Terengganu, the pinas and the bedar are the result of this cultural interchange. Jib and bowsprit of the two are of western origin, with junks almost never carrying one.

The desire for the ever-faster and more manoeuvrable vessel combined the positive elements and created these junk hybrids.

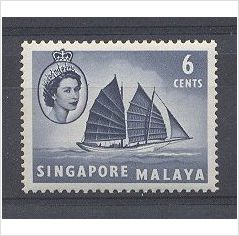
British postage stamp depicting a Malay pinas, 1955

The boatbuilders of Terengganu were re-"discovered" during the World War II by the Japanese navy who had wooden minesweepers built there by the carpenters and fishing folks.

Since that time the Malays have stopped building sailing boats for their own use, but they kept manufacturing fishtrawlers and ferries, built using the old techniques. Rising timber prices and lack of demand forced one after the other yard out of business, so today this tradition is on the brink of extinction, with very few able craftsmen still practicing this rare old building technique.

After the 2nd world war was over, the boat building of the island of Duyong in Kuala Terengganu was again discovered by traditional boat enthusiasts from western countries. Amongst those boats that were built, there were eight pinas including one big enough to qualify as a "Perahu Besar", the pinas Naga Pelangi.

The pinas built for westerners are:

Name of boat	Builders (shipyard)	LOD	Year built	Original owner	Country
Jun Bathera, now June Bathra	Abdullah bin Muda	52 ft (16 m)	1976	Christine, Rohani Longuet	France
Sri Duyong	Abdullah bin Muda	52 ft (16 m)	1976	William Harburn	Australia
Unnamed	Che Ali bin Ngah	45 ft (14 m)	1982 – project abandoned	Claude Besnar	France
Bilbo – bedar/pinis mix	Che Ali bin Ngah	60 ft (18 m)	1985	Francis Clement	Belgium/Italy
June Bathra 2	Abdullah bin Muda	52 ft (16 m)	1976, launched 1986	Larry Smooky	USA
Unknown	Haji Rashid (Seberang Takir)	60 ft (18 m)	1986, launched 2003	Olivier	Switzerland
Yok Yor	assembled craftsmen of Duyong	60 ft (18 m)	1997	Philippe Poggi	France
Naga Pelangi	Hasni bin Ali	72 ft (22 m)	2004, launched 2009	Christoph Swoboda	Germany

== Gallery ==
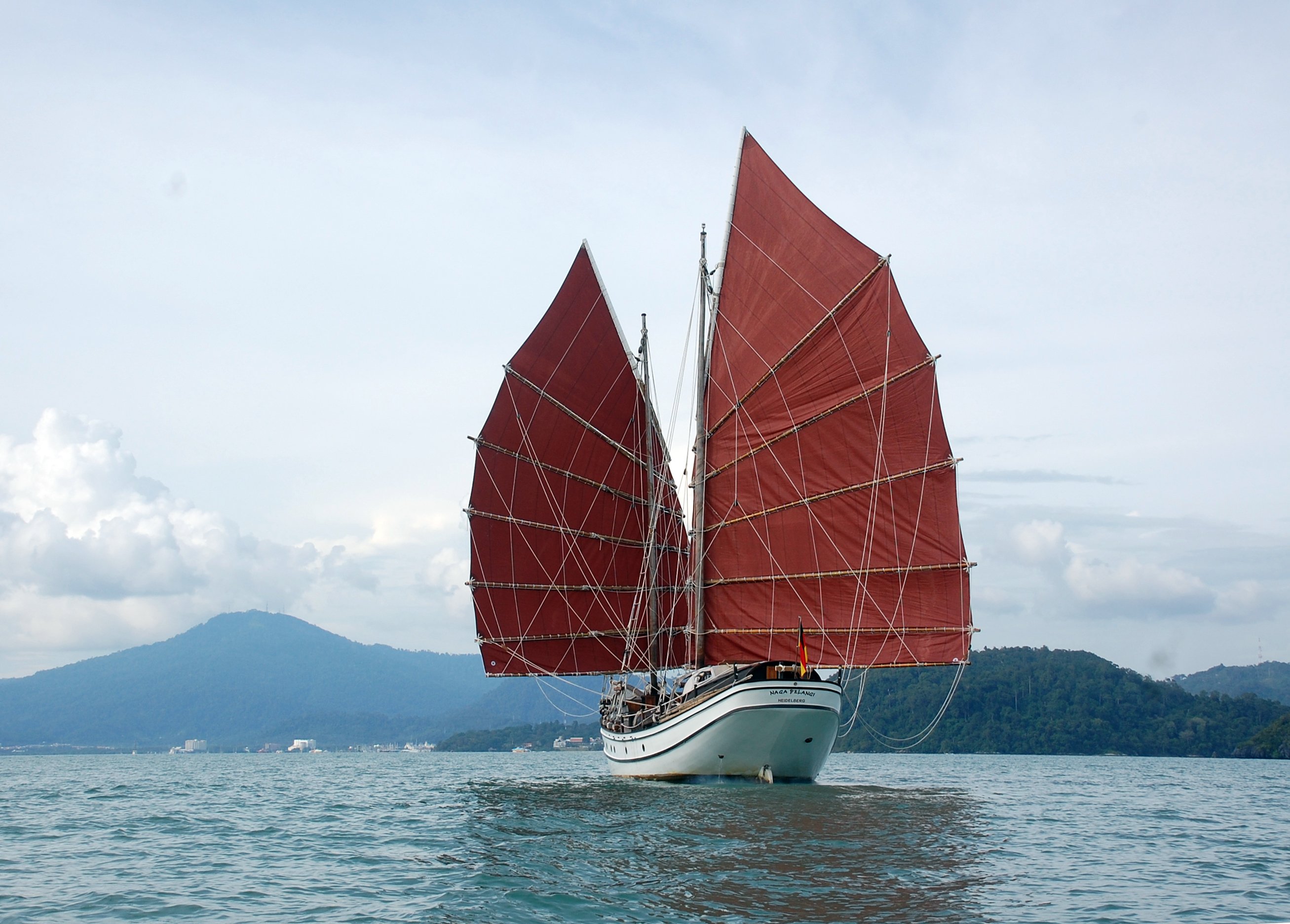
The pinas Naga Pelangi sailing butterfly

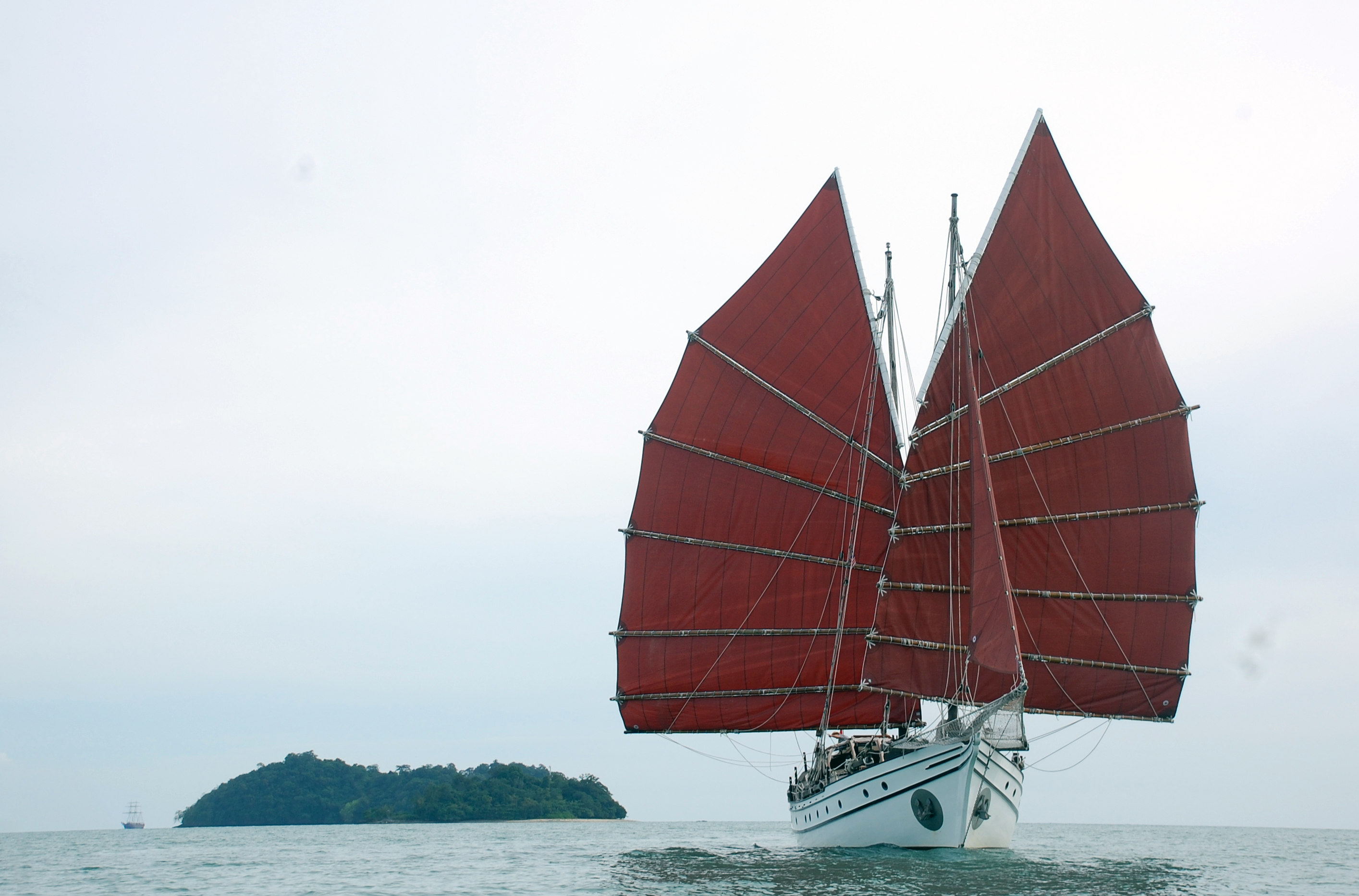
The pinas Naga Pelangi 2010 in Langkawi

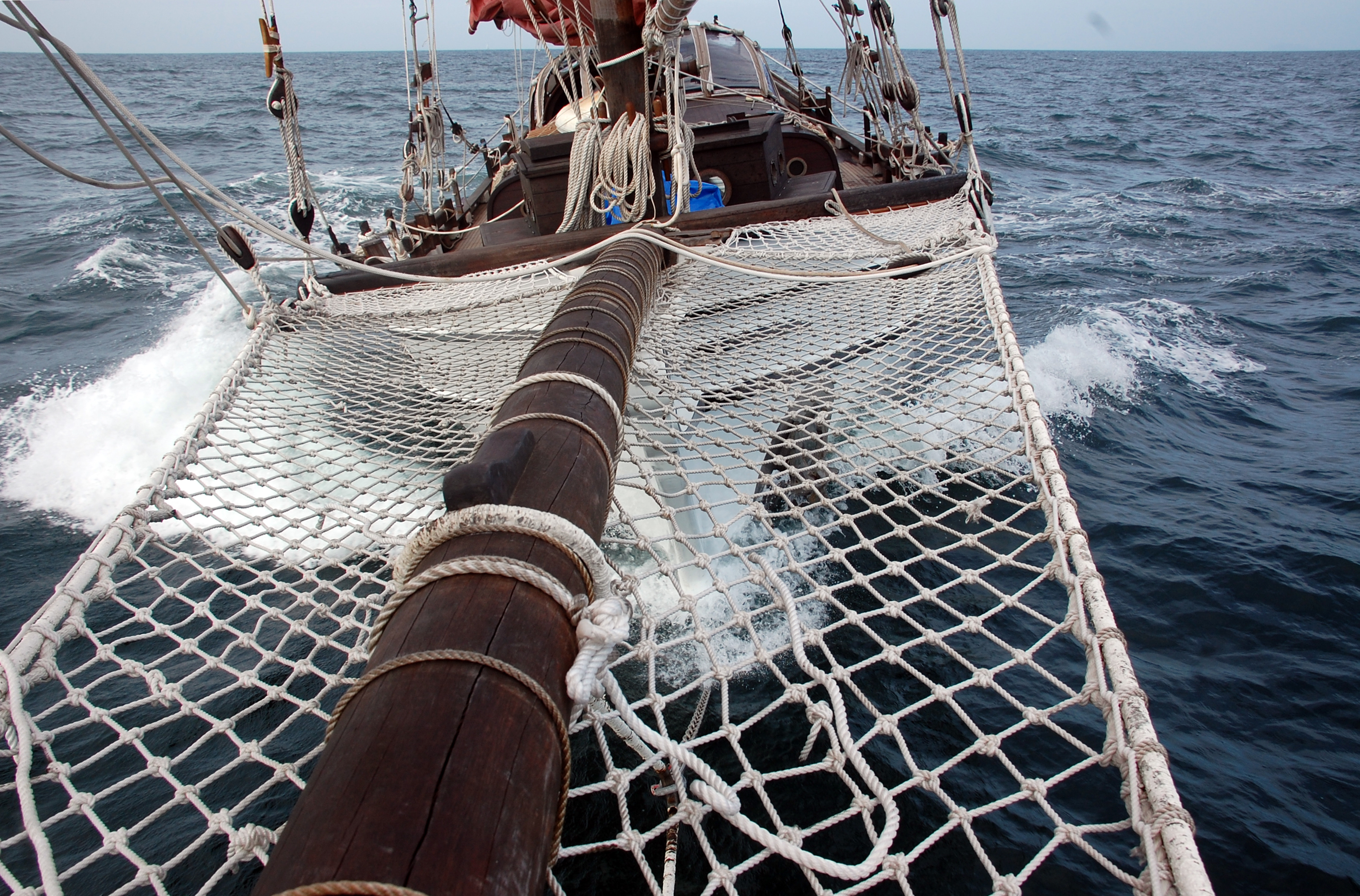
The pinas Naga Pelangi beating at 7 knots

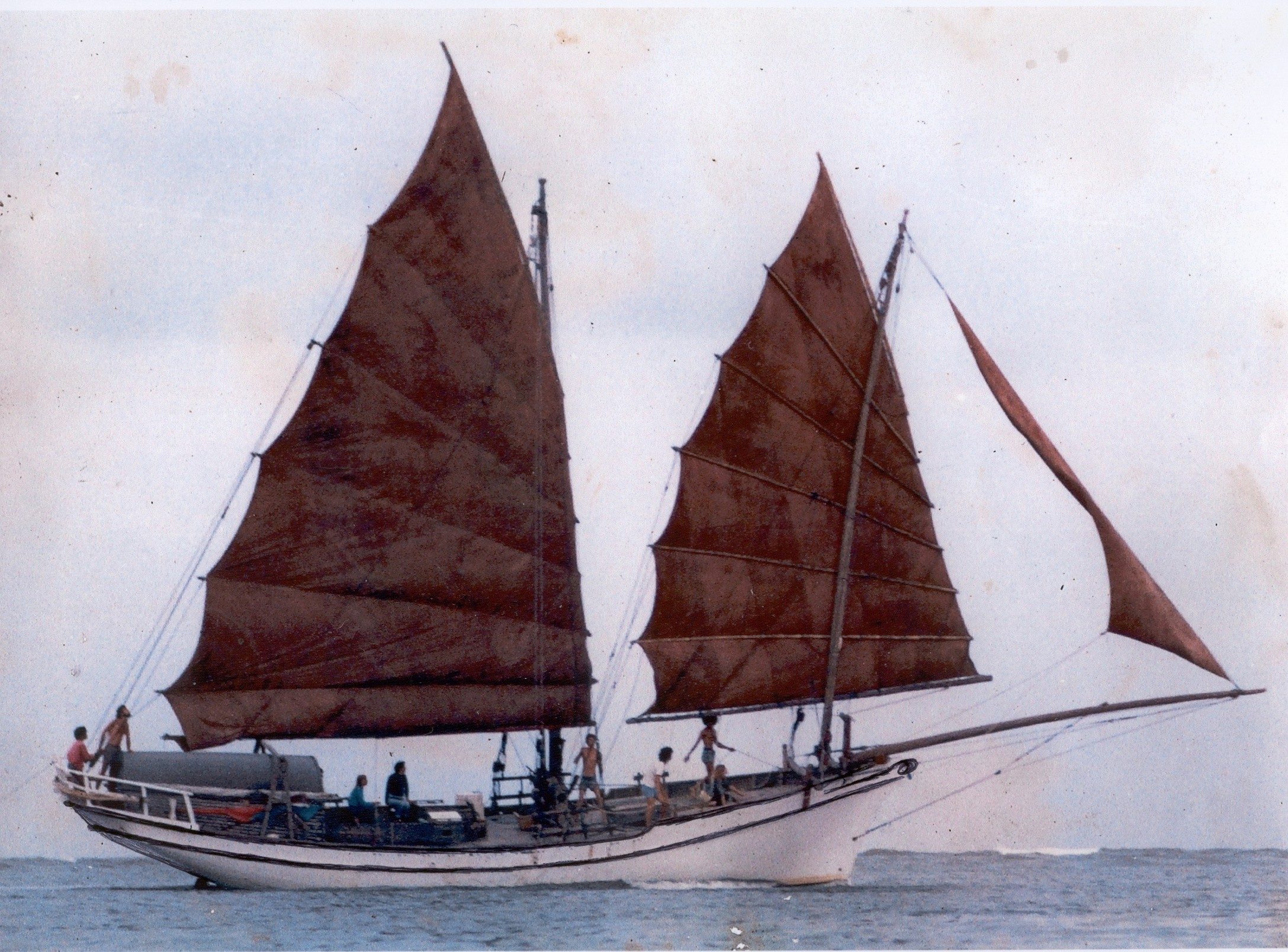
The Jun Bathera, a pinas built in 1976, sailing in the estuary of the Terengganu river, 1981

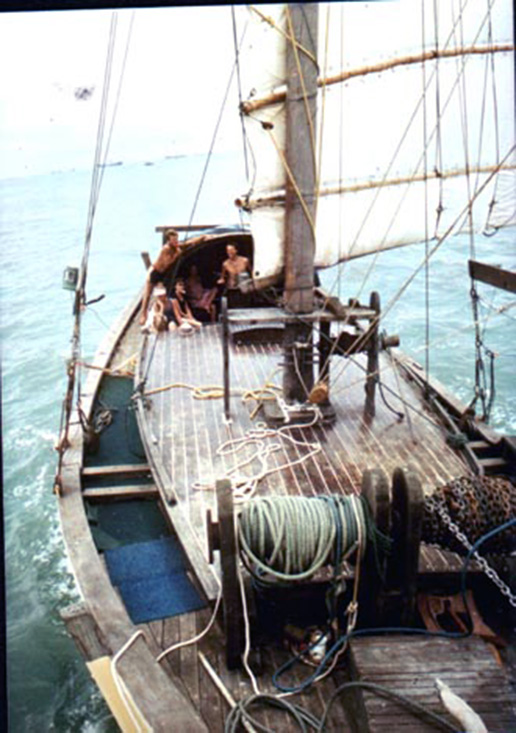
The pinas Sri Duyong in Singapore, 1980

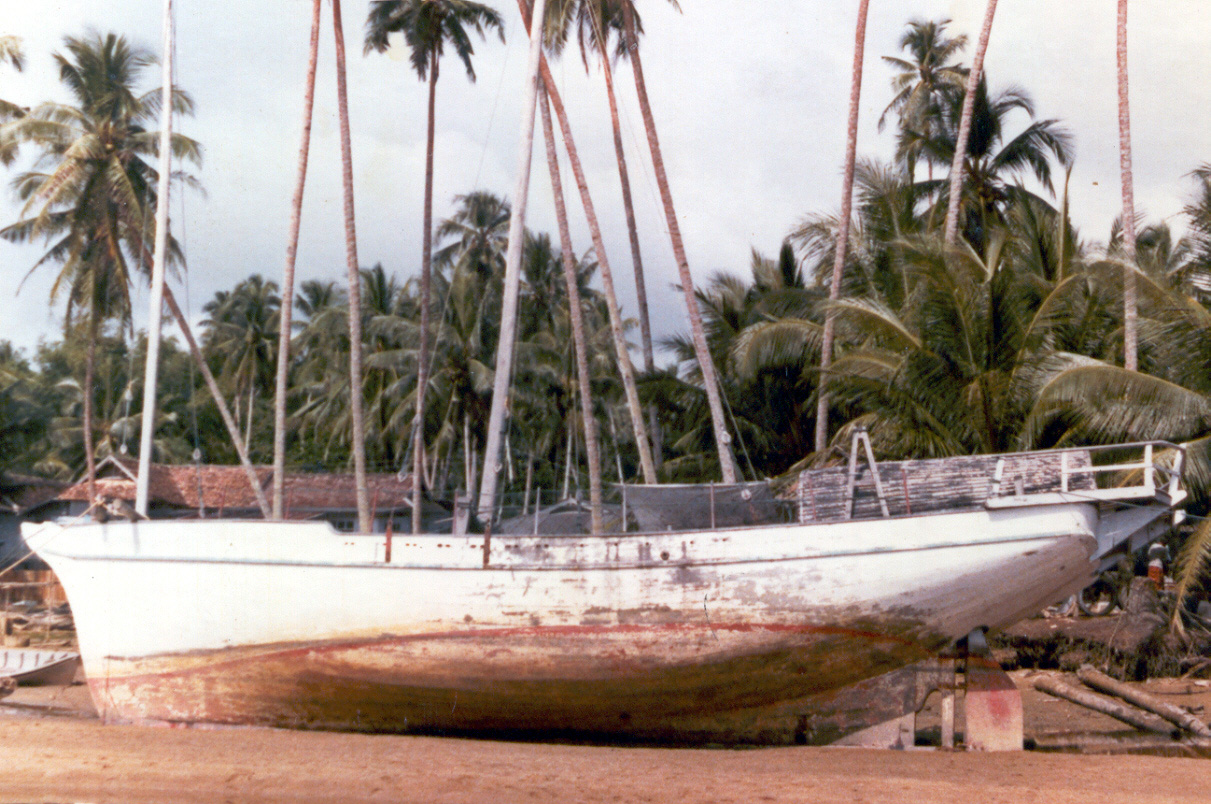
The pinas Jun Bathera on Duyong island, 1979

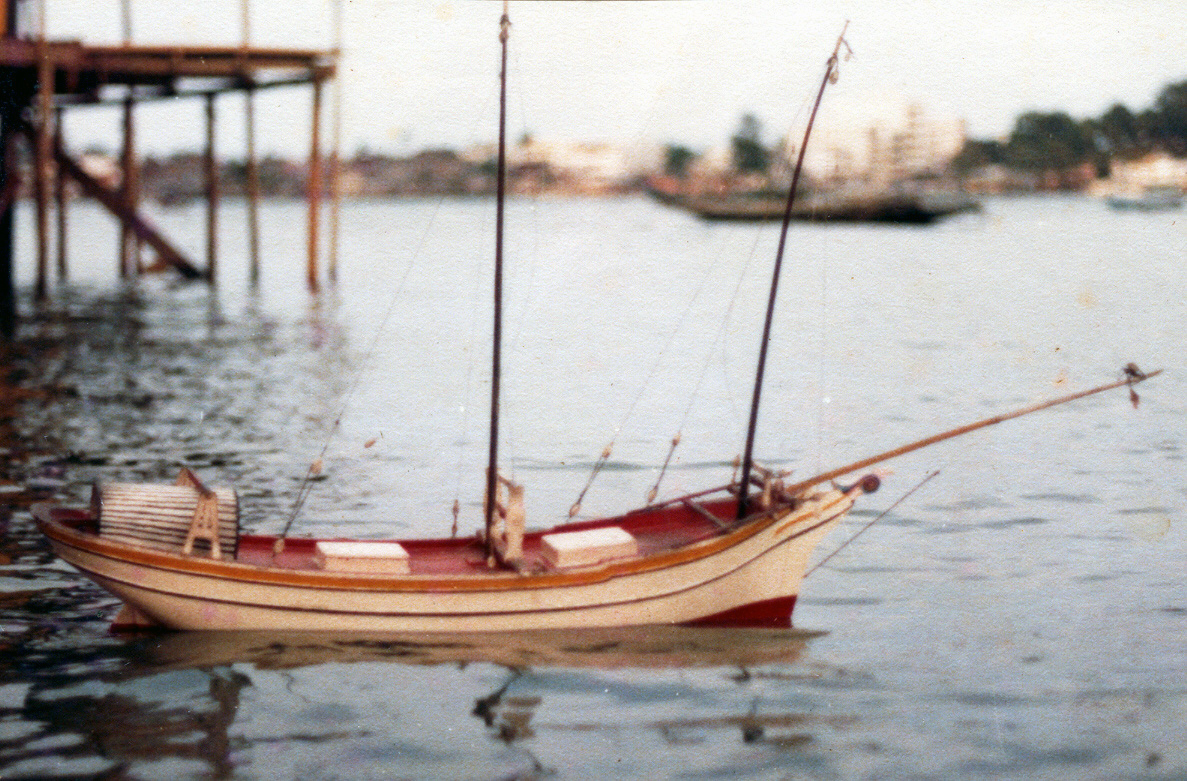
An old pinas model floating on the Terengganu river, 1981

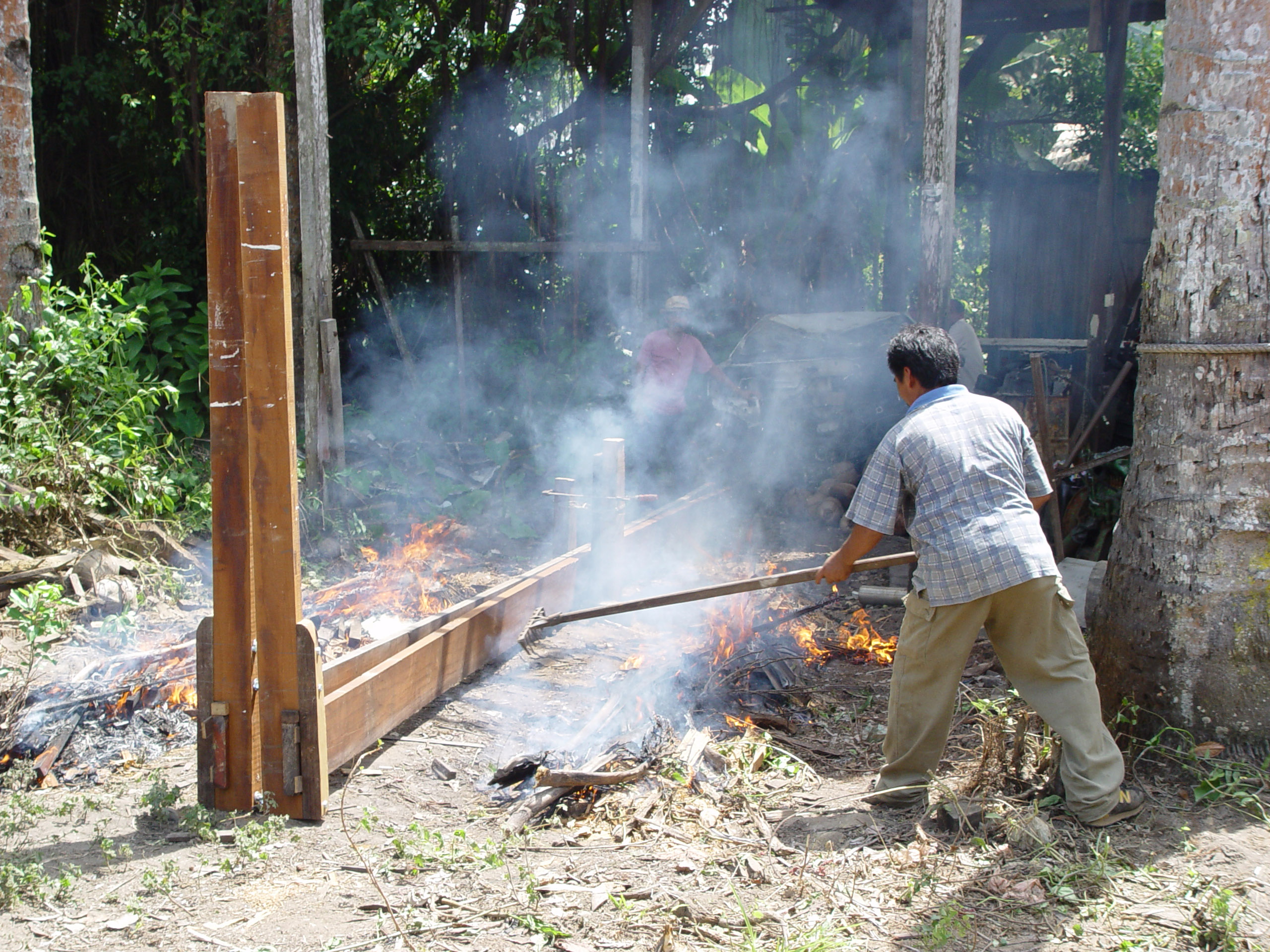
Building a pinas 2004 - plank bending 1

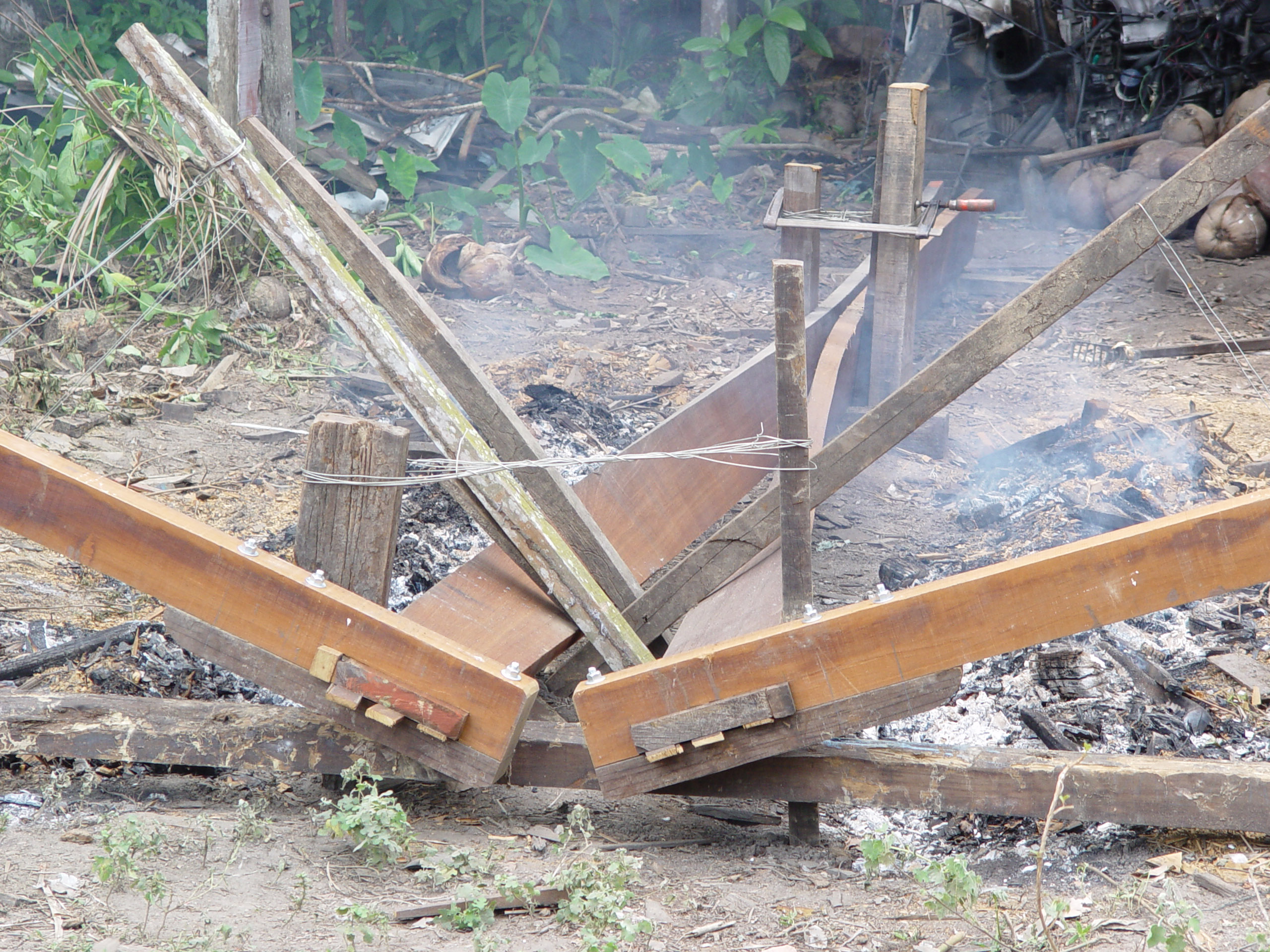
Building a pinas 2004 - plank bending 2

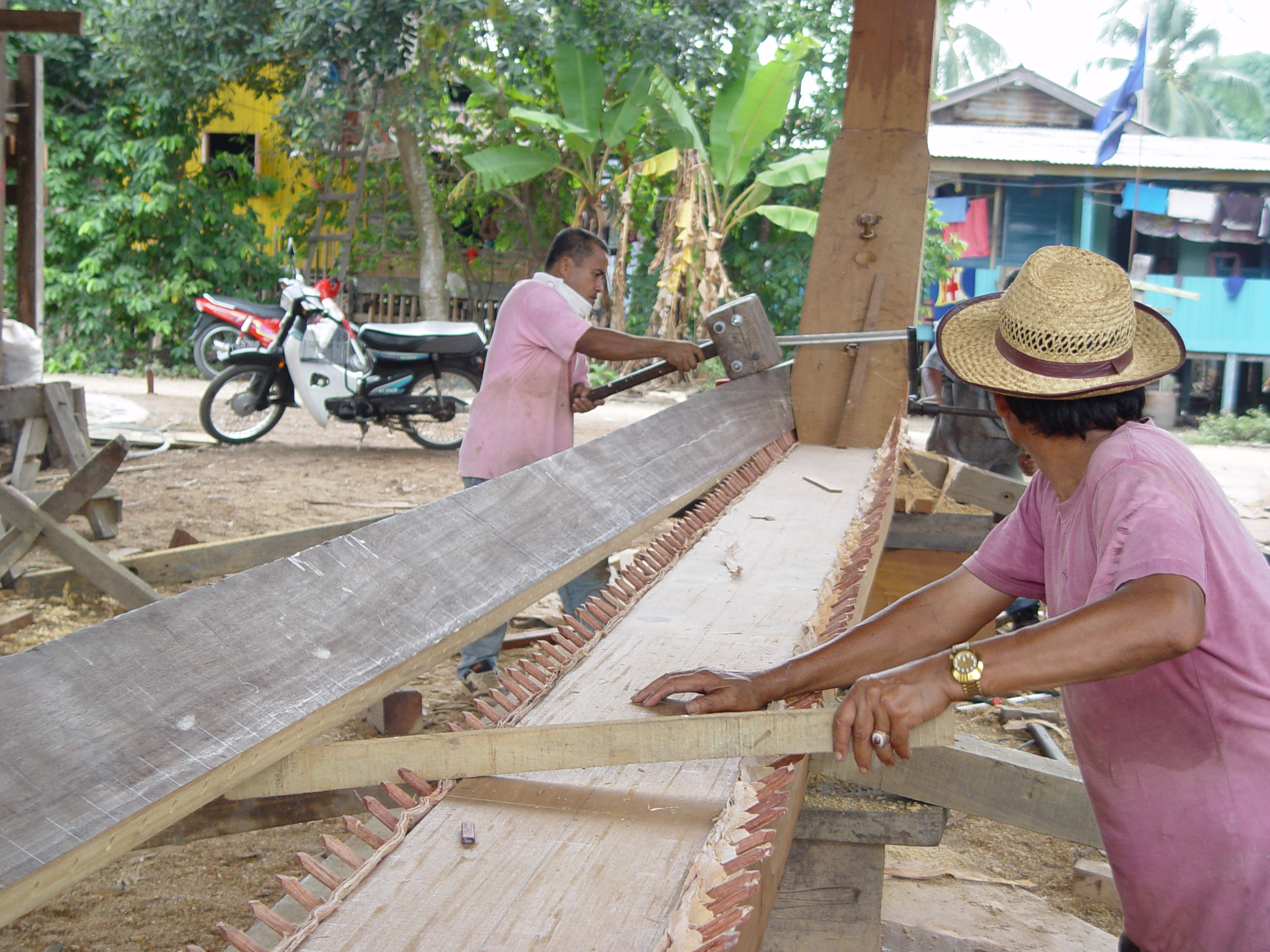
Building a pinas 2004 - fitting the first plank, the garboard strake

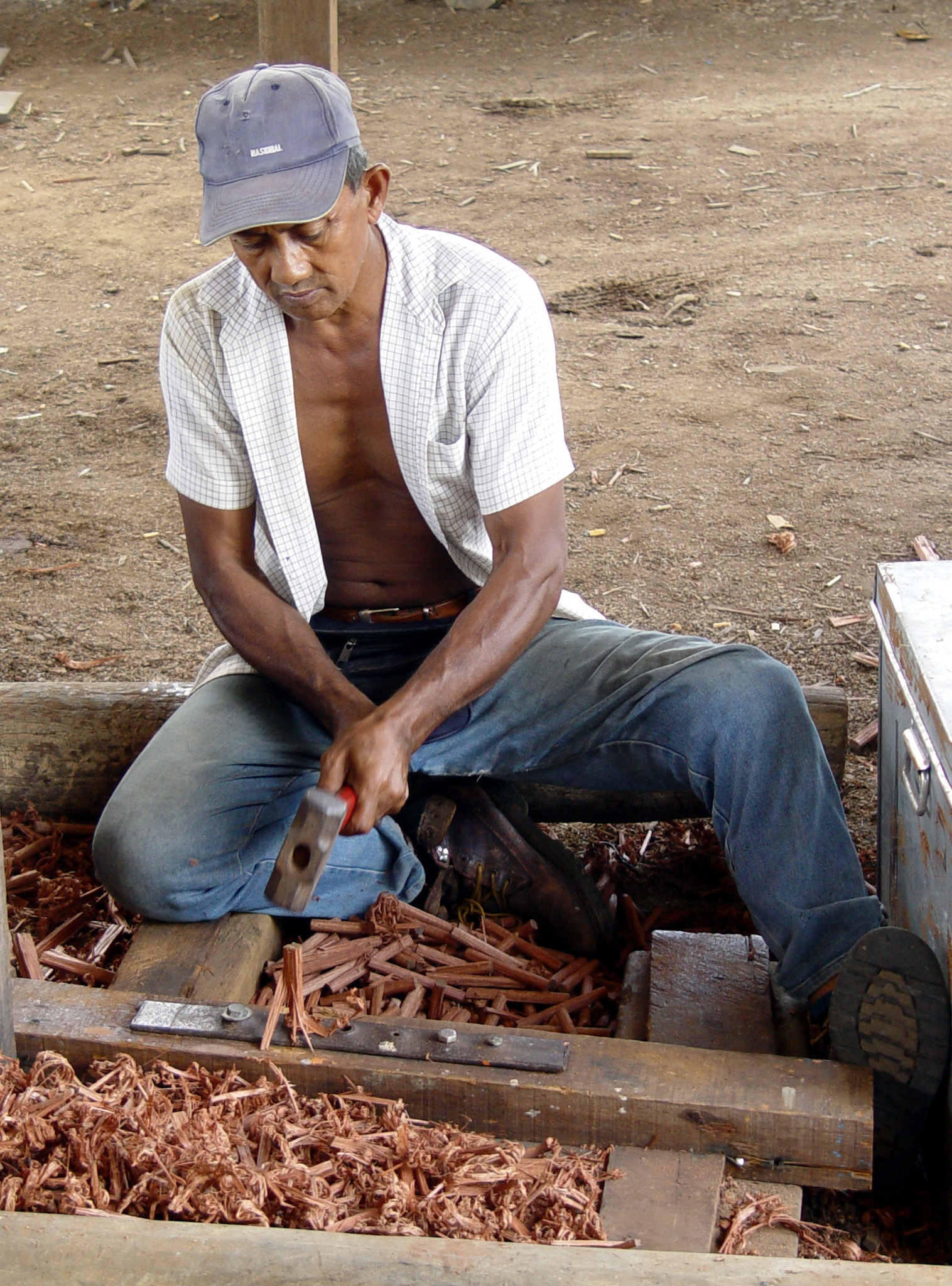
Building a pinas 2004 - producing the wooden dowels

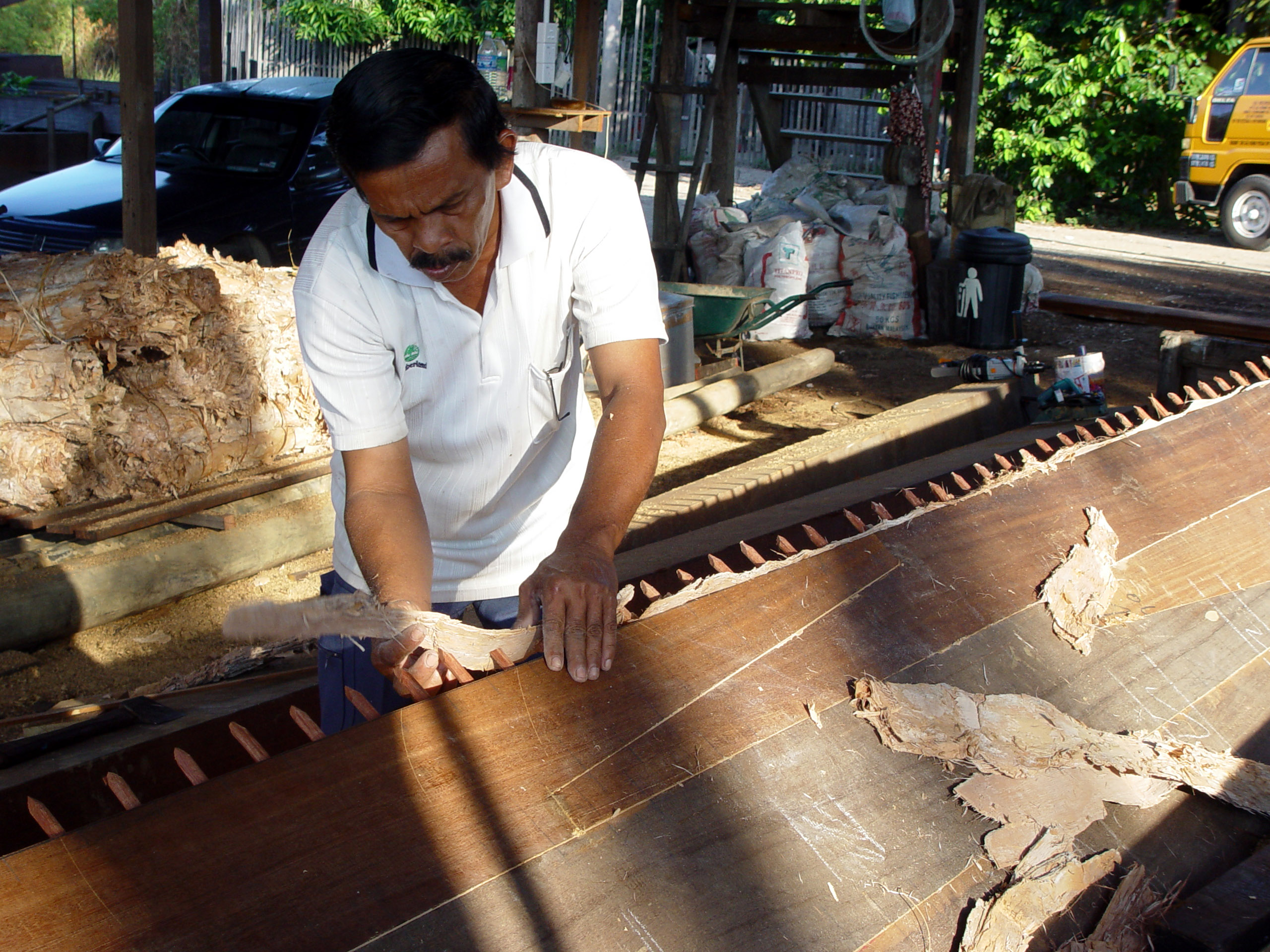
Building a pinas 2004 - applying the caulking bark

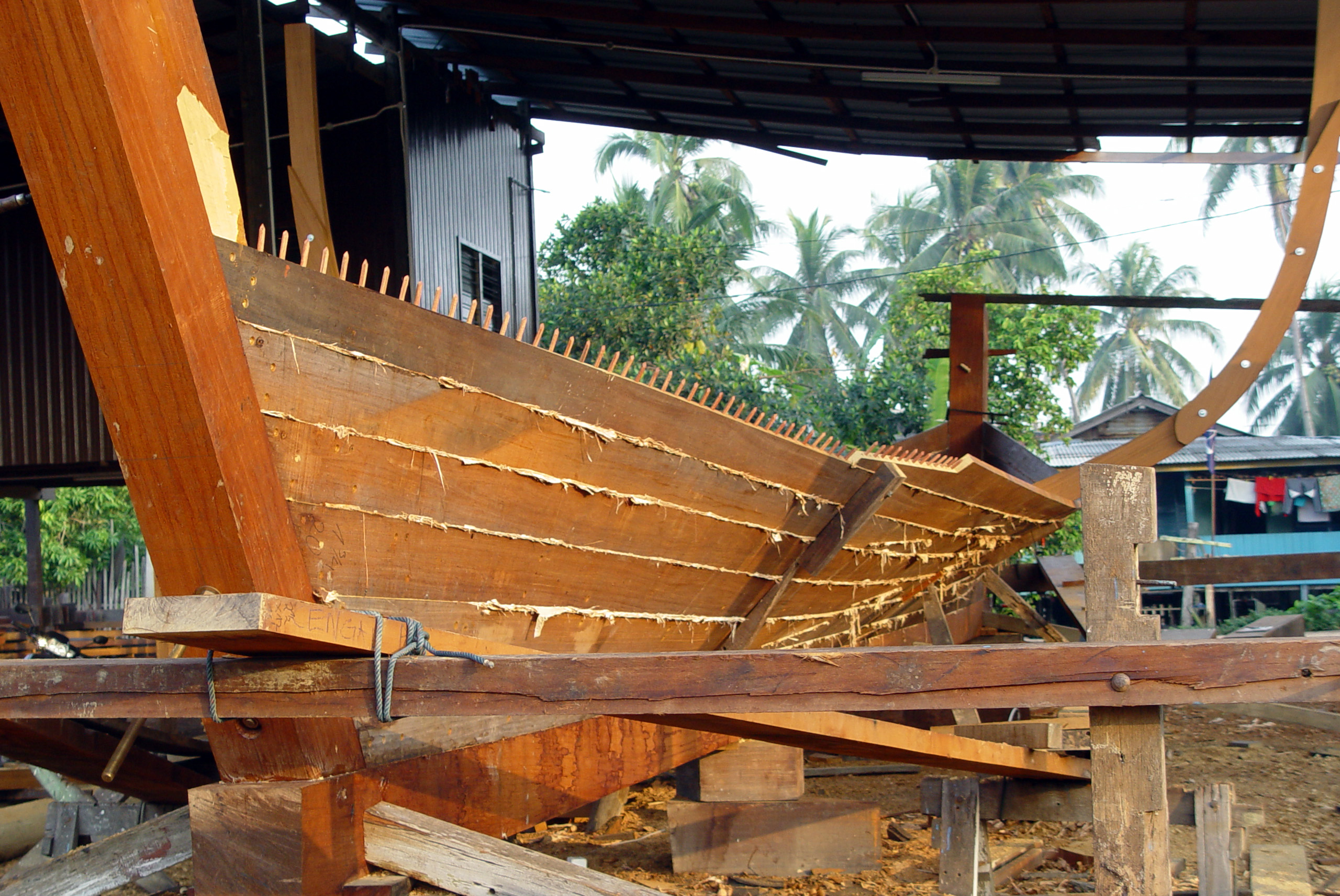
Building a pinas 2004 - no frames yet

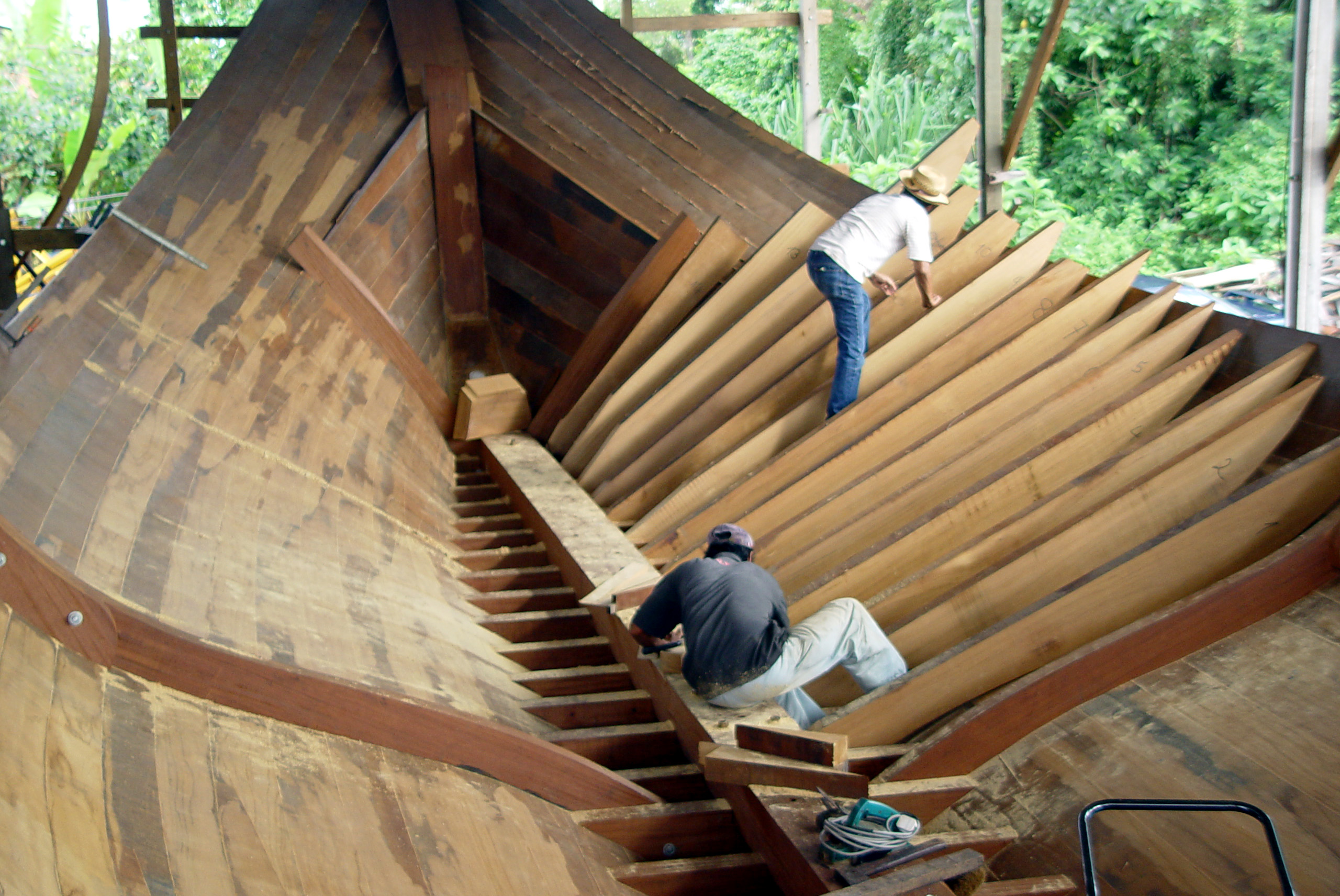
Building a pinas 2004 - frames are adjusted to hull

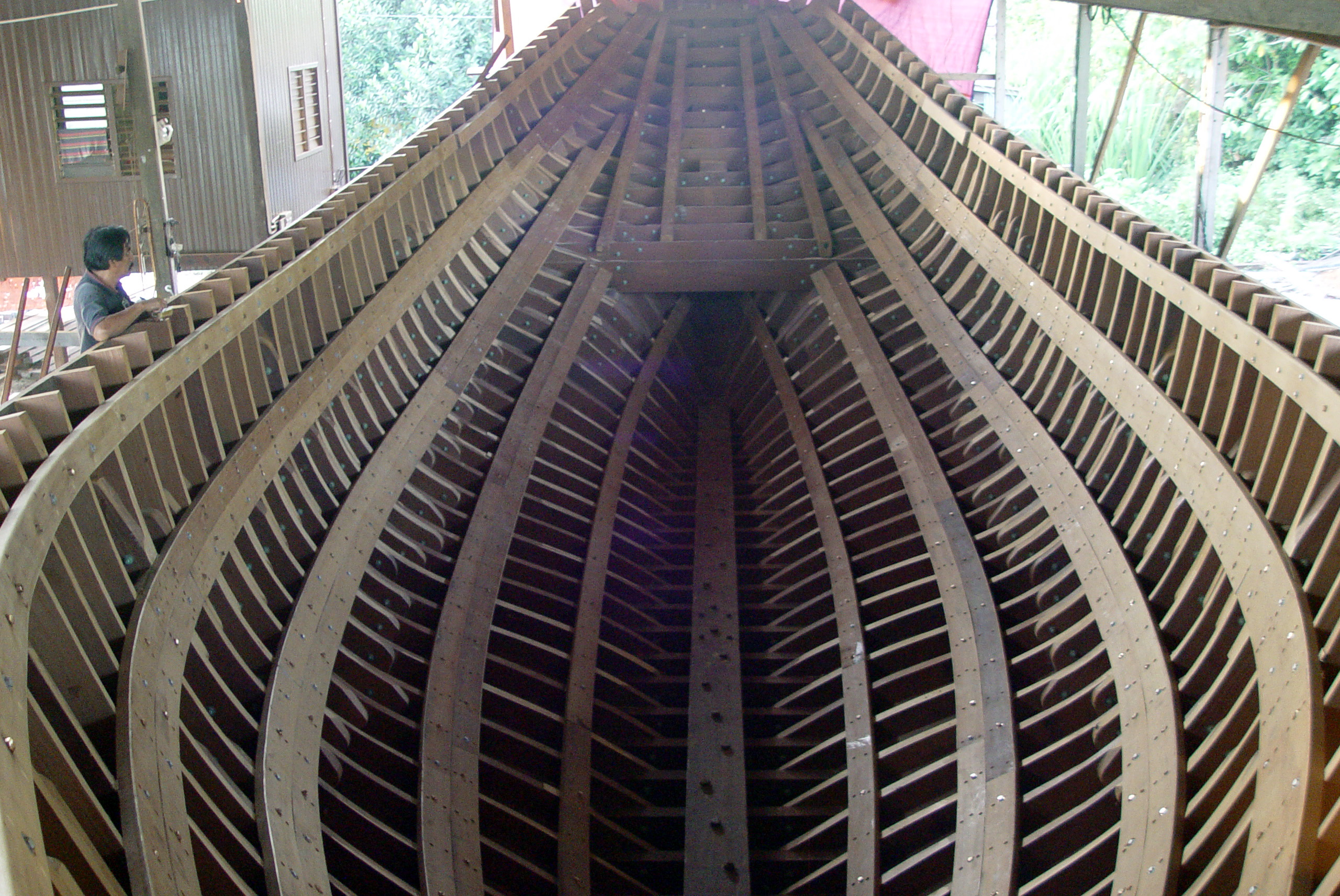
Building a pinas 2004 - all frames and stringers are in place

== See also ==
- Bedar (ship) – Traditional double-ended Malay ship
- Junk rig – Type of sail rig used in East Asia
- Junk (ship) – Traditional Chinese type of boat
- Djong – Javanese sailing ship
- List of schooners
- Lorcha (boat) – Sailed cargo vessel
- Pinnace (ship's boat) – Watercraft
- Full-rigged pinnace – Type of ship in use in the 16th and 17th centuries
- Pinisi – Type of rigging of Indonesian sailing vessels, Indonesian sailing rig
  - Palari – Type of Indonesian sailing vessel from South Sulawesi, Indonesian ship using pinisi rig
- Tongkang – Type of small boat in Southeast Asia
