= Bedar (ship) =

Traditional double-ended Malay ship

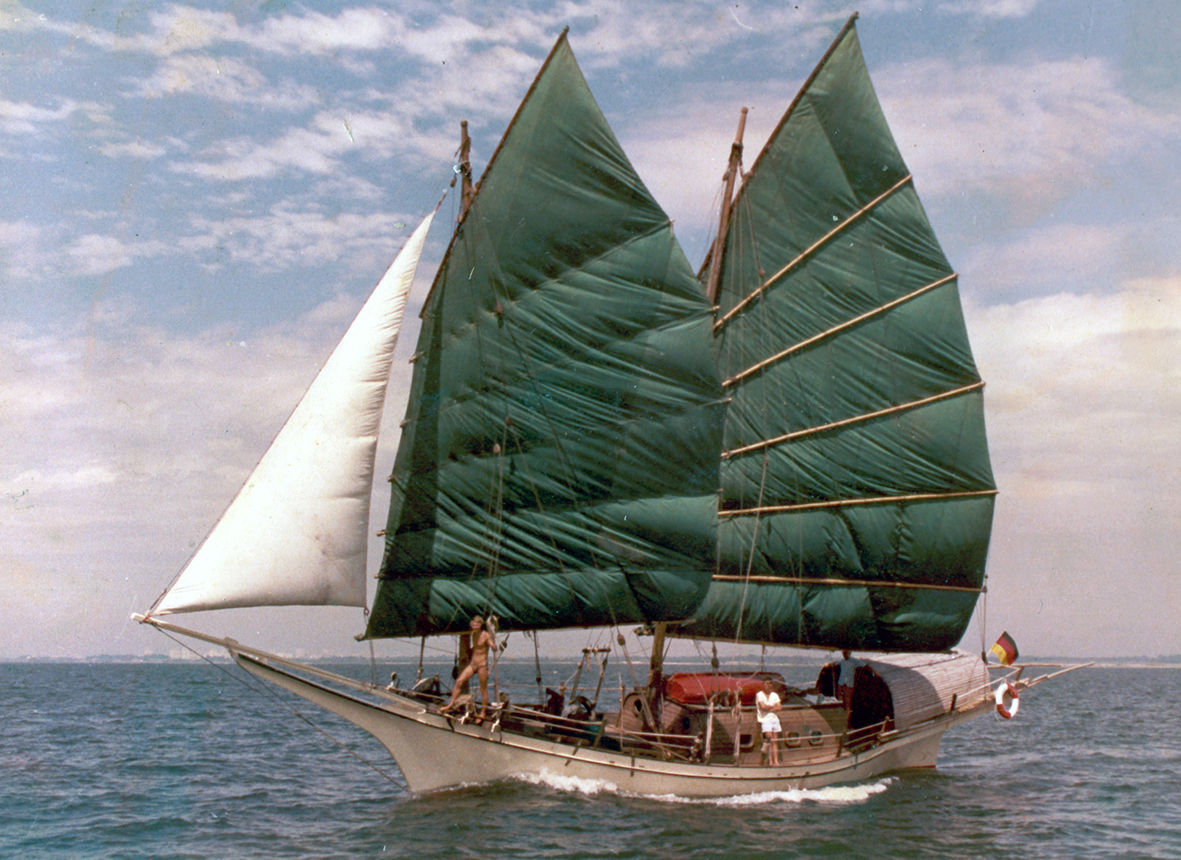
The original Naga Pelangi, a bedar built in 1981, sailing off Singapore

The term bedar (spelled "bedor" in Terengganu) is applied to a wide variety of boats of the east coast of Malaysia that carry one or two junk sails and lack the typical transom stern of the perahu pinas. These junk rigged boats are usually built in the Terengganu area. The stern of the bedar is a classical "canu" or "pinky stern," being a typical "double ender", a bit like a modern ship's lifeboat, with a very full turn of the bilge and with markedly raked stem and stern. They came in small versions as small one-masted fishing vessels — anak bedar (Malay for child bedar) and were built as big as 90 feet over deck (LOD). The majority of the bedars were usually 45 to 60 feet (13.7–18.3 m) over deck. The bedar, like all Terengganu boats, was built of Chengal wood by the Malays since the 19th century and roamed the South China Sea and adjacent oceans as a highly seaworthy traditional sailing vessel.

== Etymology ==
The Malay word bedar means an elongated and flattened beak, broadening towards the tip (i.e. like the bill of a platypus).

== Description ==
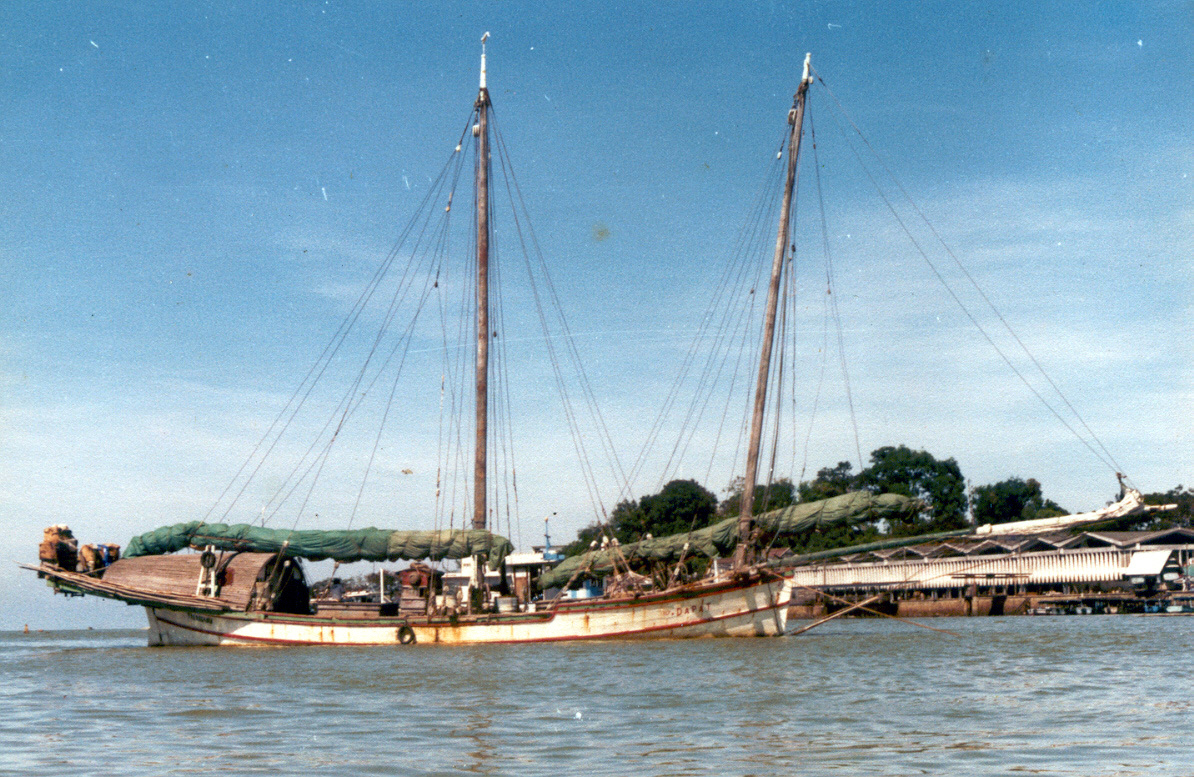
The last big sailing bedar, Dapat, (87' / 26.5 m LOD) anchored in Kuala Terengganu in 1980

The bedar is a sailing junk that is mainly built in the kuala (English: rivermouth) of the Terengganu River.

The smaller and medium-sized bedars often had a fine slanting projecting prow of various lengths and a short one at the similarly built stern. The bowsprit was resting on top of this forward projection which is called sudu (English: spoon or duck's bill).

The boats equipped with a sudu were referred to as bedar luang sudu (from Malay word sudu: spoon, or sudu itek: duck's bill). The conspicuous sheer (ship) of the bedar varied as well. The smaller ones with a long projection having more sheer and the bigger ones with a short sudu and short sheer. Bedars above 70 feet (21 m) rarely carried a long sudu but featured almost straight stem and stern posts, very much like the bedar Dapat.

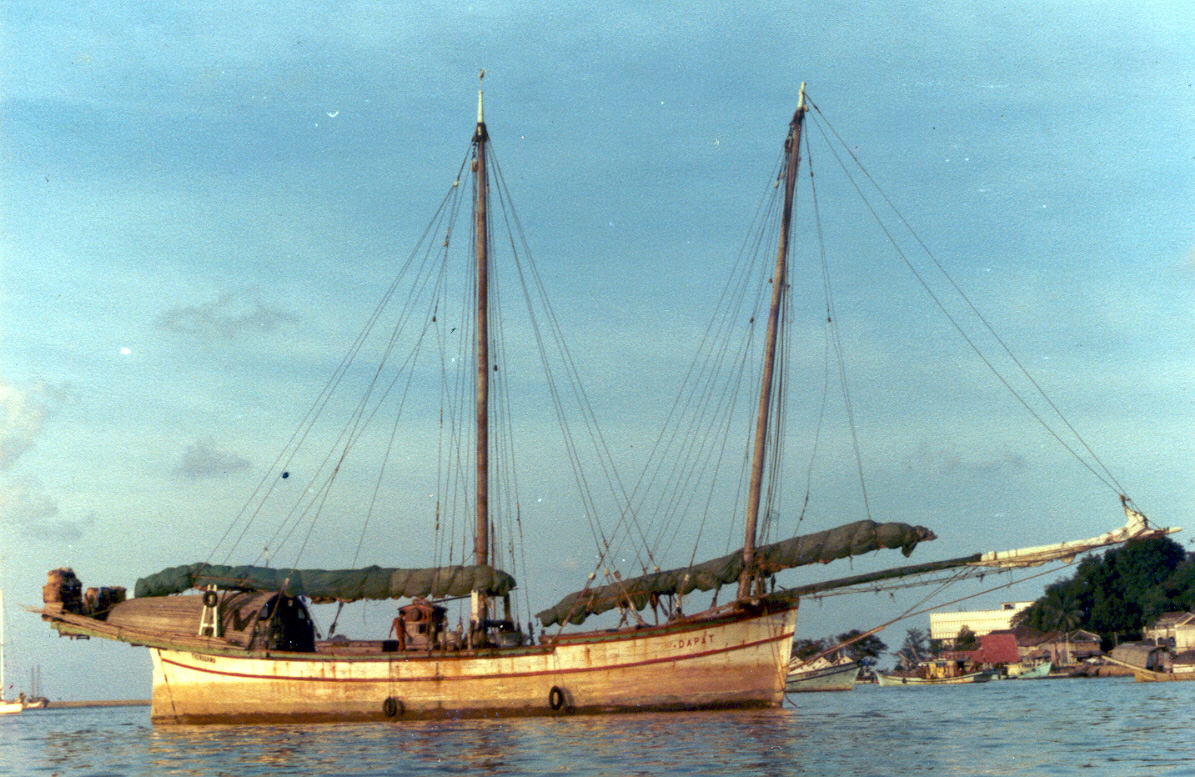
The bedar Dapat unloaded in the estuary of Kuala Terengganu, 1980

Like the pinas, the bedar over 45 feet/13.7 m (LOD), carried two masts, one in the bow, called "topan", slightly raked forward; The main mast, called "agung" was placed a bit forward of the center of the boat. The bedar had a very long bowsprit, slightly bent downwards by the bobstay. Both masts carried a fully battened lug or "junk-sail" of typical Chinese design. These sails were not made of cloth but of a matting material called "tikal" that is also used for floor matting and other purposes. Like most junk sails the battens were made of bamboo, usually creating 6 individual panels to the sail. The halyard was attached almost in the middle of the sail, and since the luff, or edges, of the sail was nearly straight and only about half the length of the markedly convex leech, the yard, when hoisted, was sitting in an angle of about 15° – 20° with the vertical.

The foresail was set on the port side of the topan and the mainsail on the starboard side of the agung. A relatively small jib was set on the bowsprit. All bedars, even those up to or more than 80 feet (24 m) were steered by a tiller with a pulley block system easing the strain on a conventional rudder hinged on the stern post. This tiller was operated from within the round cabin (cup) on the dandan platform over the stern. The hold stored cargo.

The hull of the bedar is influenced by the Arab dhow with their long raked stemposts and the dows often being double ended vessels.

== Building technique ==
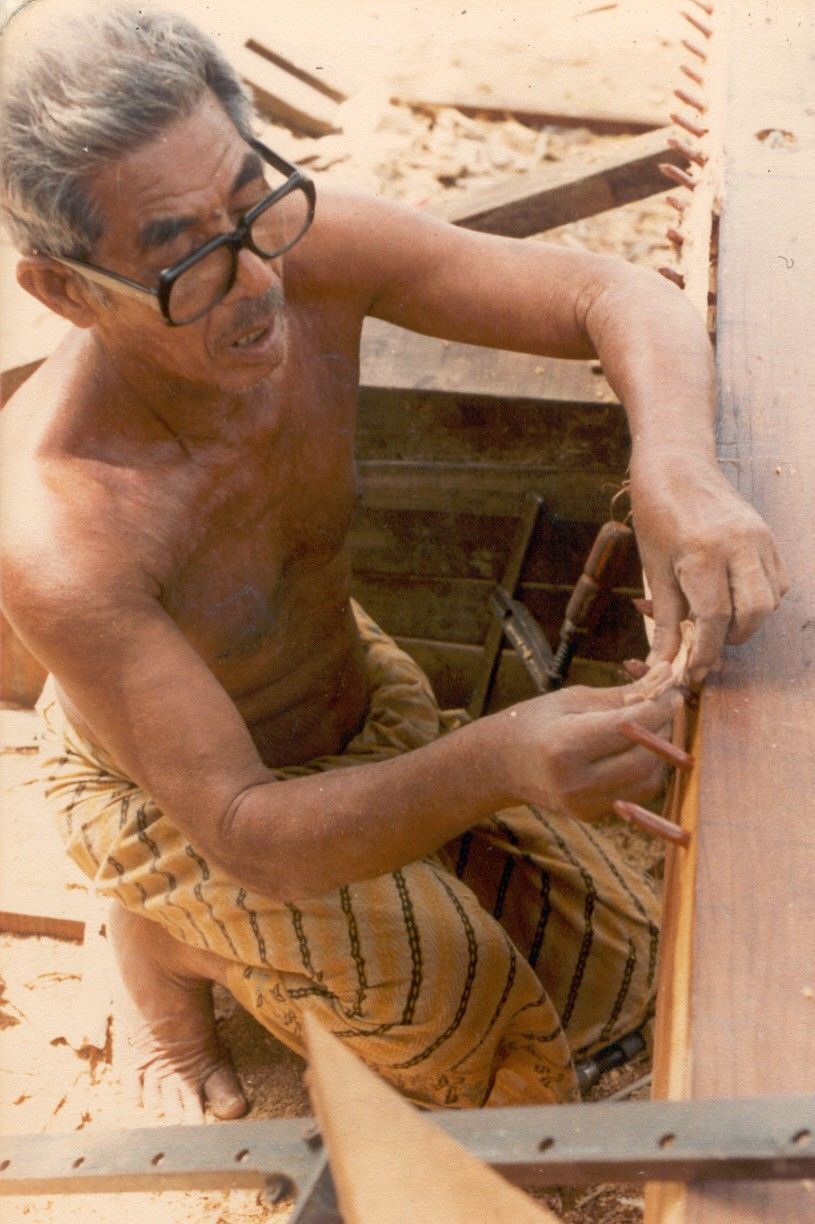
Che Ali bin Ngah building the bedar Naga Pelangi on Pulau Duyong, Kuala Terengganu, 1981

The bedar boats of Terengganu are built using indigenous Malaysian techniques to build wooden boats. They build without plans, hull first, frames later. The planks are fire bent and joined edge on edge (carvel) using "basok" (wooden dowels) made from Penaga — ironwood (Mesua ferrea). Rather than the European style caulking hammered into a groove between the planks, a strip of kulit gelam (English: paperbarks skin) of the Melaleuca species is placed over the dowels before the new plank is hammered home. This 1 – 2 mm layer of a natural material has remarkable sealing properties.

== History ==
The tradition of building wooden boats in modern Malaysia reaches far back in time, involving overseas trade, fishing, piracy, travelling up the many rivers. For each purpose they developed a special design.

With Malacca becoming the main trading centre for the spices arriving from the Moluccas Islands (Indonesia), the Malay Peninsula turned into a melting pot of the seafaring, trading civilisations: Indians and Chinese, Arabs and Indonesians, Vietnamese and Thai, Burmese, Europeans and others, they all arrived in their distinctive craft, inspiring the Malay shipbuilding.

The two "Perahu Besar", (English: big boat) of Terengganu, the pinas and the bedar are the result of this cultural interchange. Jib and bowsprit of the two are of western origin, with junks almost never carrying one.

The boatbuilders of Terengganu were rediscovered during the Second World War by the Japanese navy who had wooden minesweepers built there by the carpenters and fishing folks.

There were 5 bedars built for westerners since 1945:

Name of boat	Builders (shipyard)	LOD	Year built	Original owner	Country
Foxy Lady	Haji Nik	36 ft (11 m)	1949	Dominique	France
Burong Bahri	Che Man	32 ft (9.8 m)	1976	Jerry Williams	New Zealand
Anak Duyong	Che Man	36 ft (11 m)	1980	Steven Bisset	Australia
Naga Pelangi	Che Ali bin Ngah	45 ft (14 m)	1981	Christoph Swoboda	Germany
Raja Laut	Che Ali bin Ngah	45 ft (14 m)	1982	Uli Horenkohl	Germany

== Gallery ==
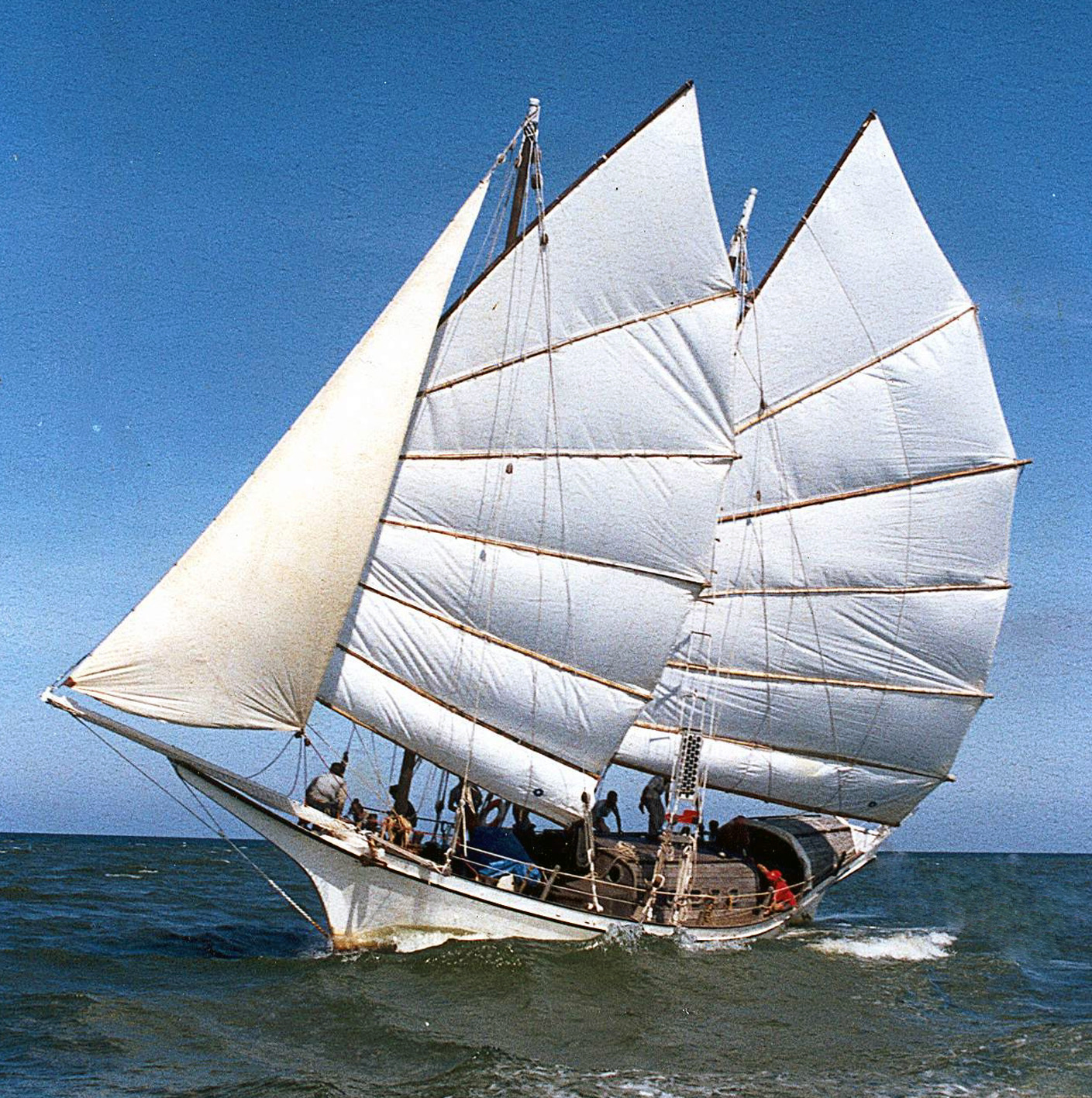
The bedar Naga Pelangi at 6 knots beating to windward off the coast of Terengganu, 1998

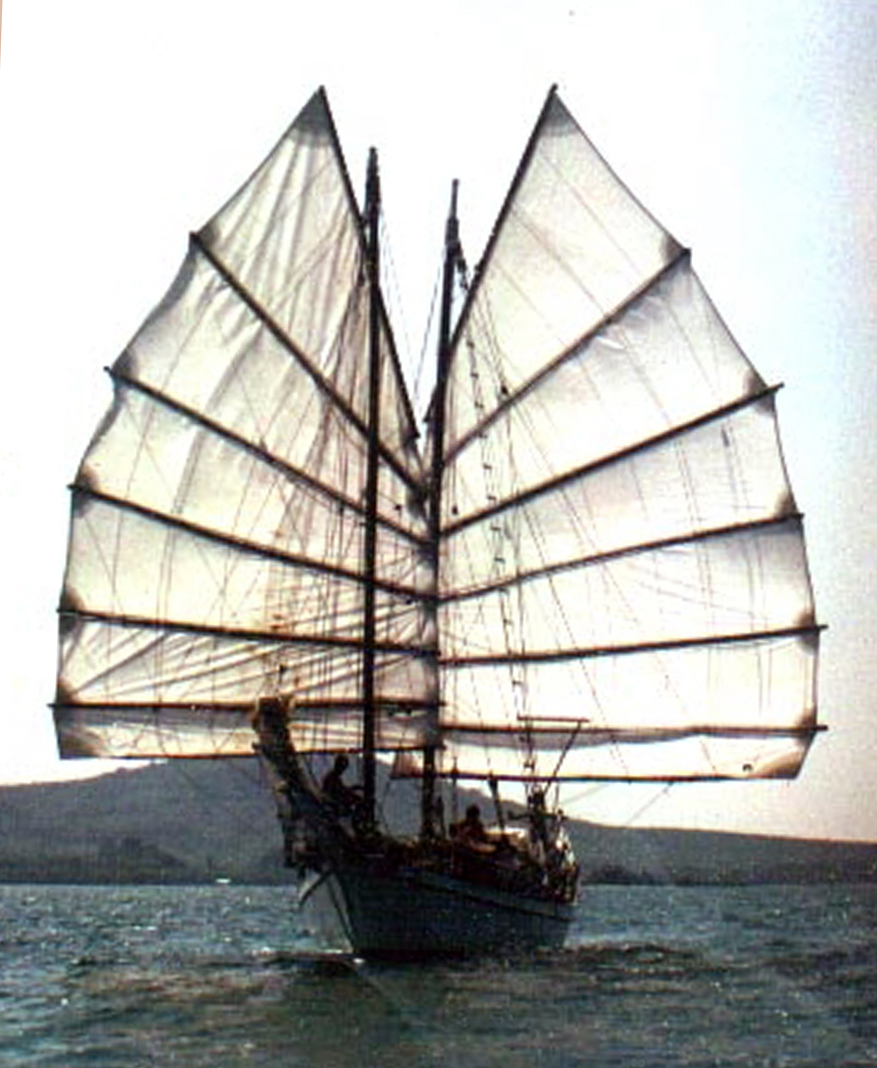
The bedar Naga Pelangi 45'/13.7 m (LOD) sailing wing to wing near Pulau Perhentian off the Terengganu coast, 1998

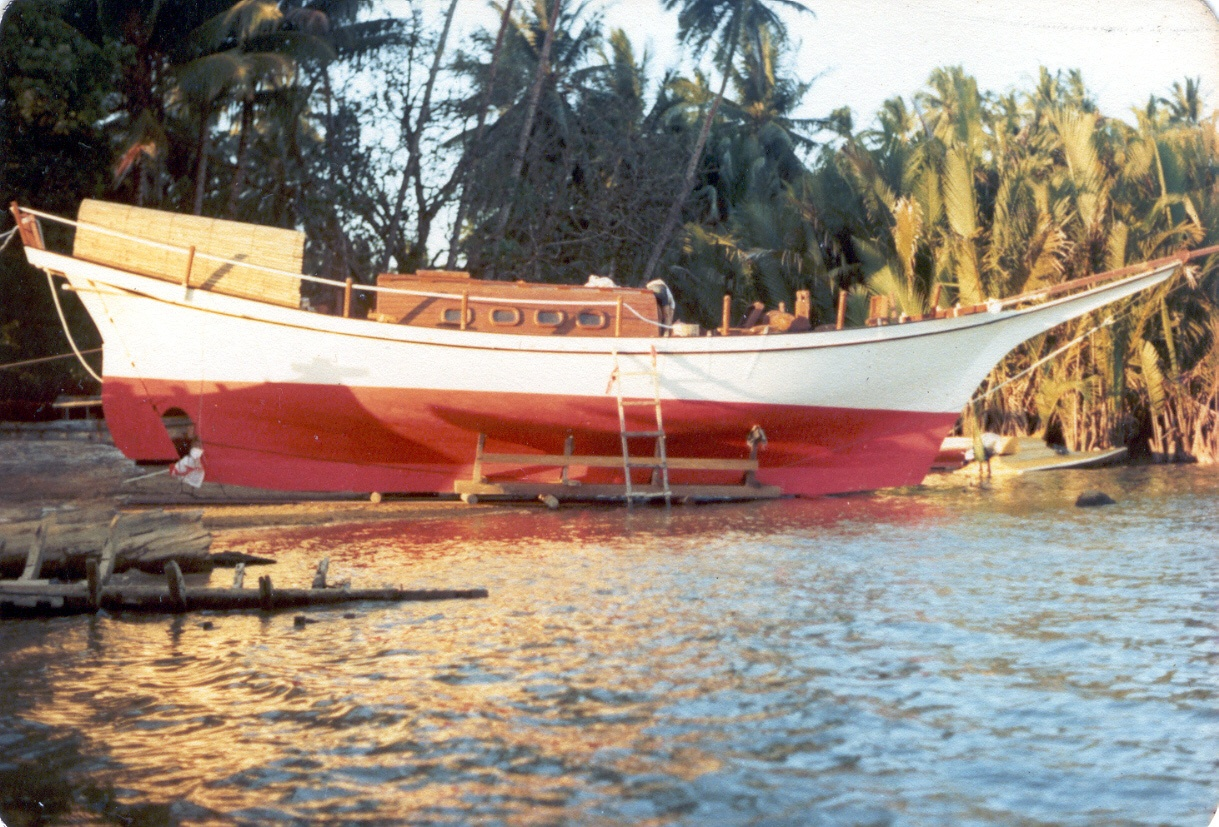
The bedar Naga Pelangi before launching, Duyong, 1981

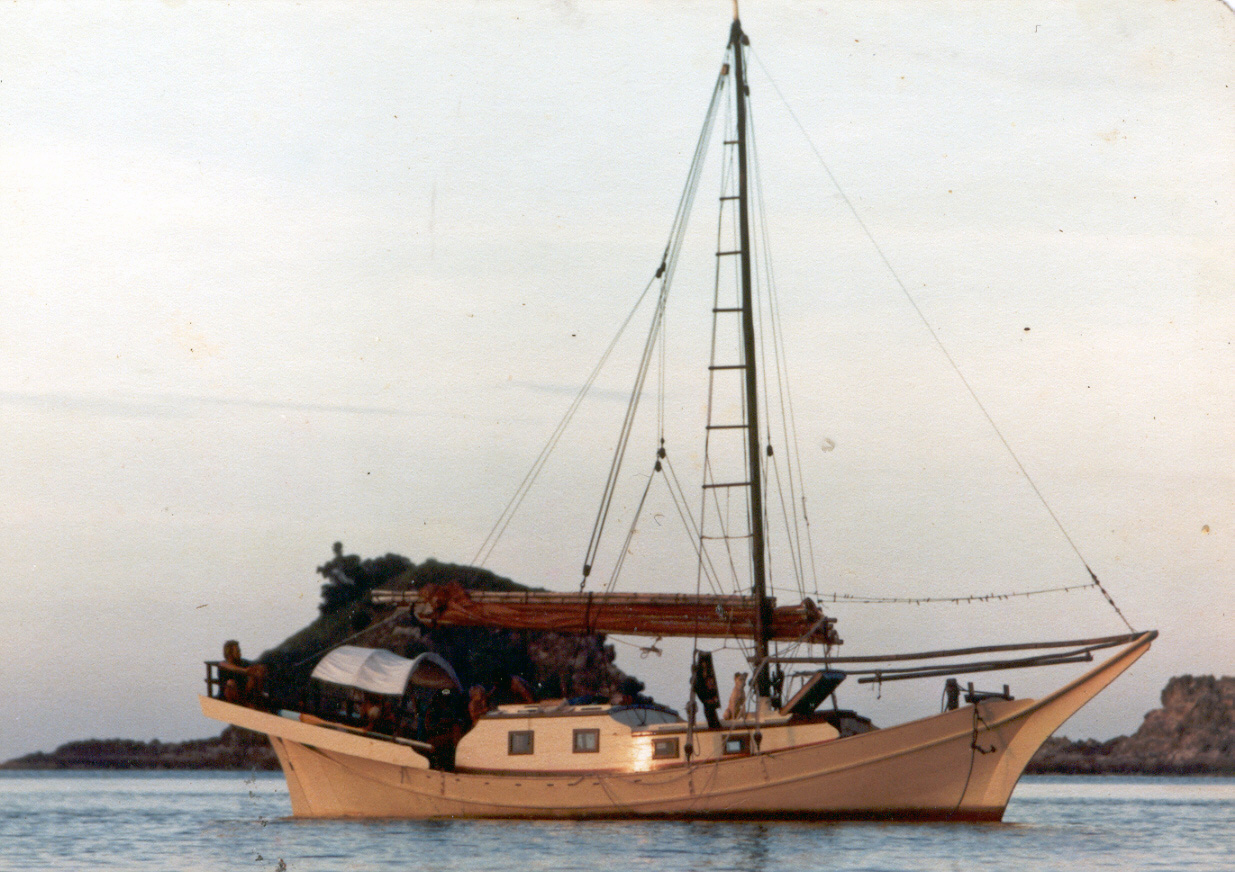
The Burong Bahri, a 32'/9.7 m (LOD) bedar anchored in Pulau Kapas, 1980

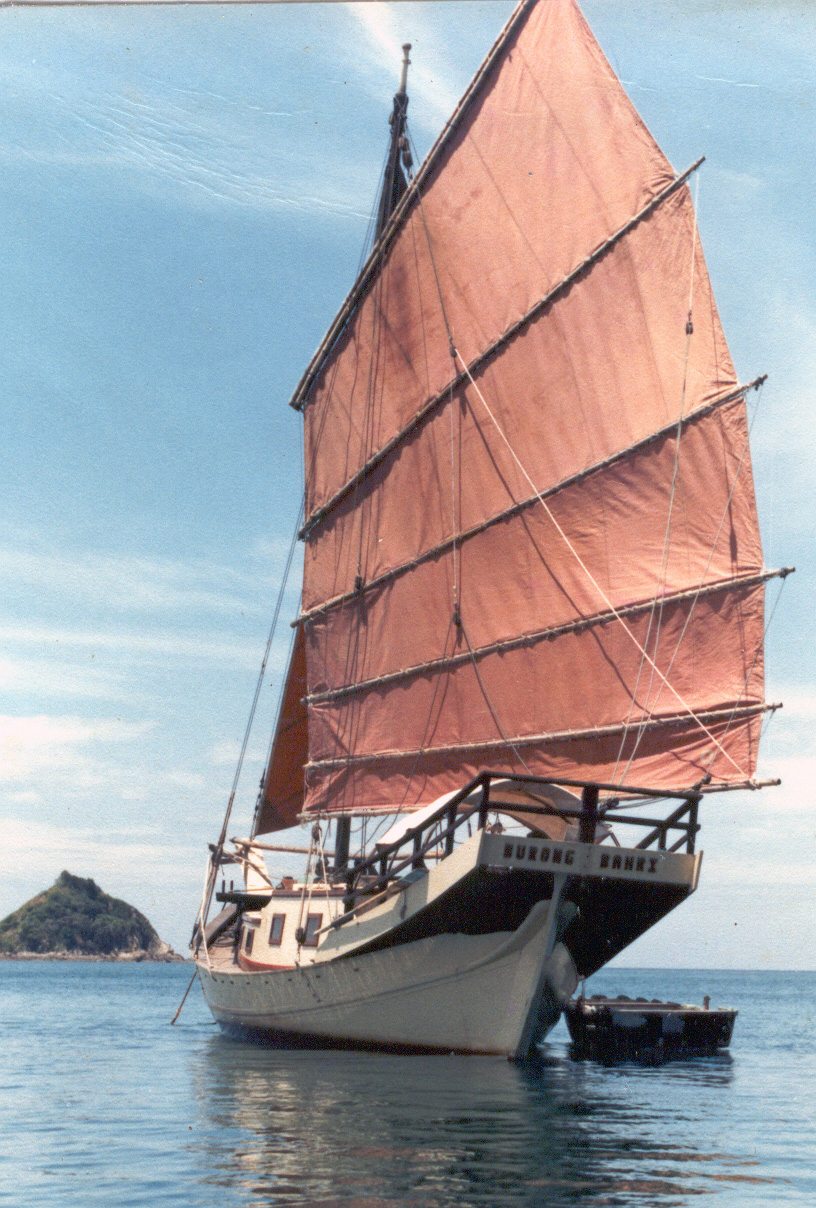
The bedar Burong Bahri of Jerry Williams

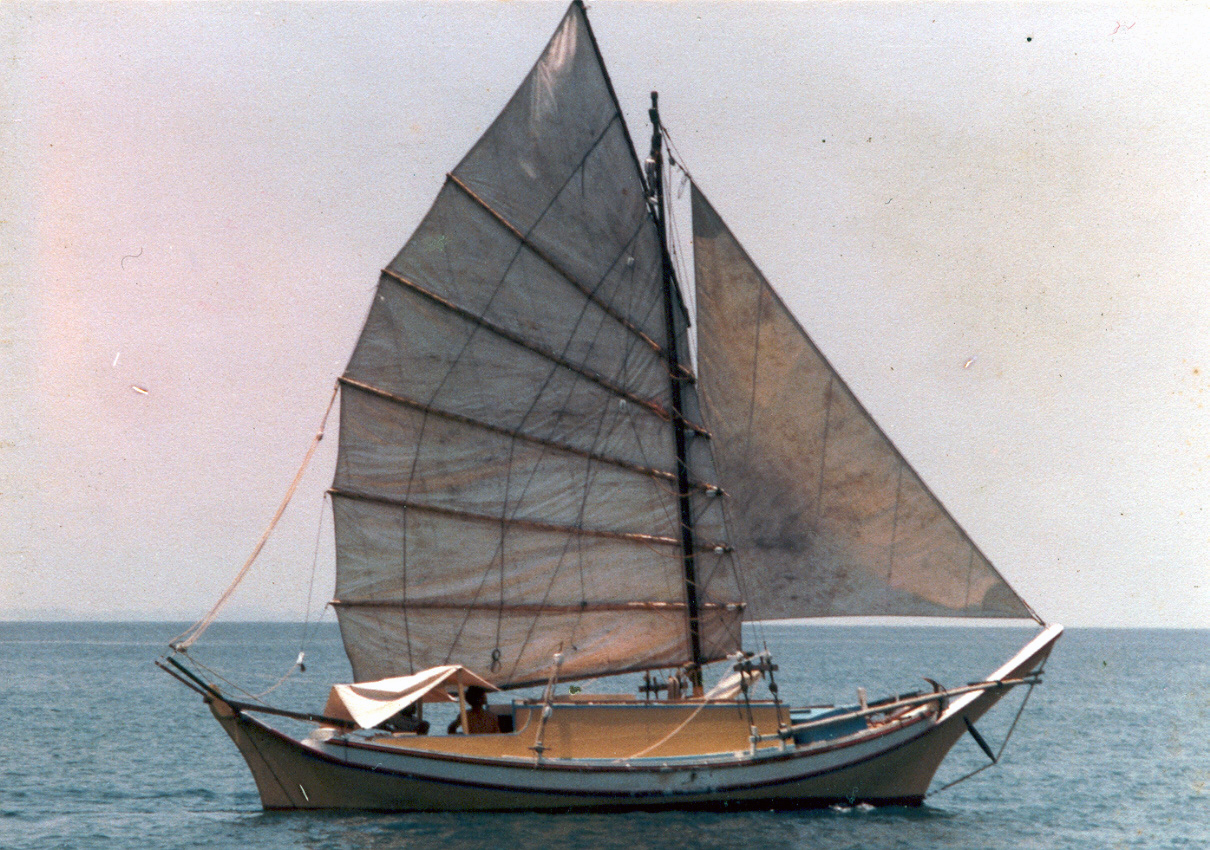
The Jusa Laut, a 28'/8.5 m (LOD) bedar, sailed by Michael Munro off the coast of Terengganu, 1994

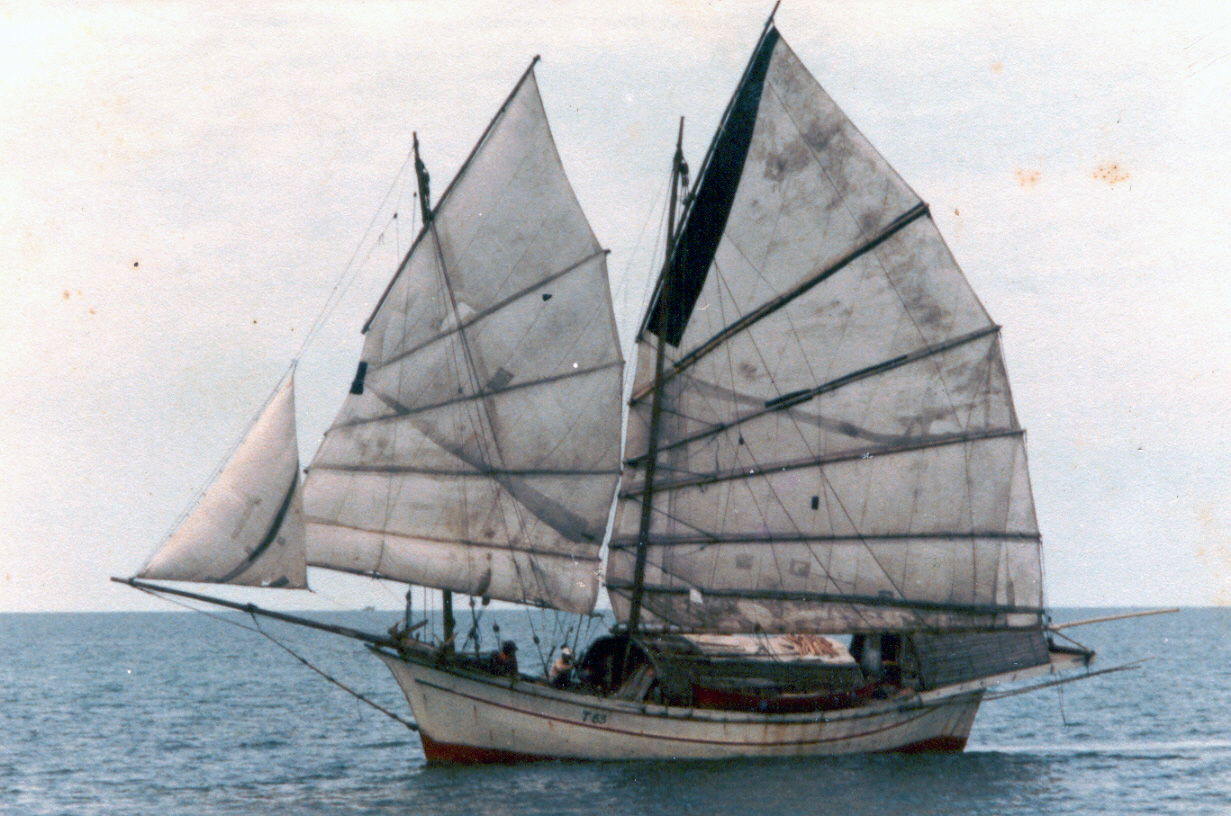
One of the last original bedar freighters 45' (LOD) sailing up to Thailand, 1981

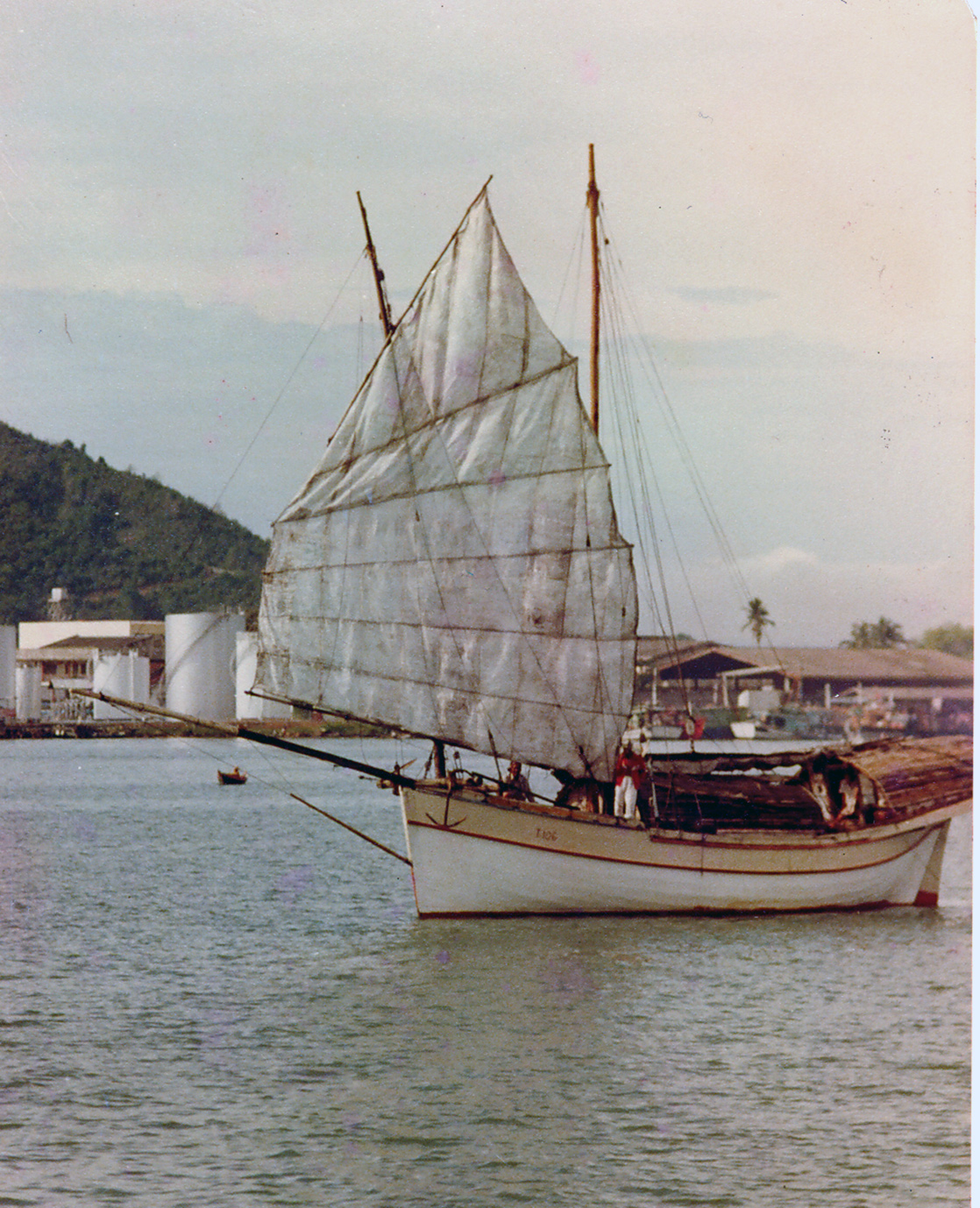
One of the last working bedars 45' (LOD) manoeuvering in port under Topan only, 1980

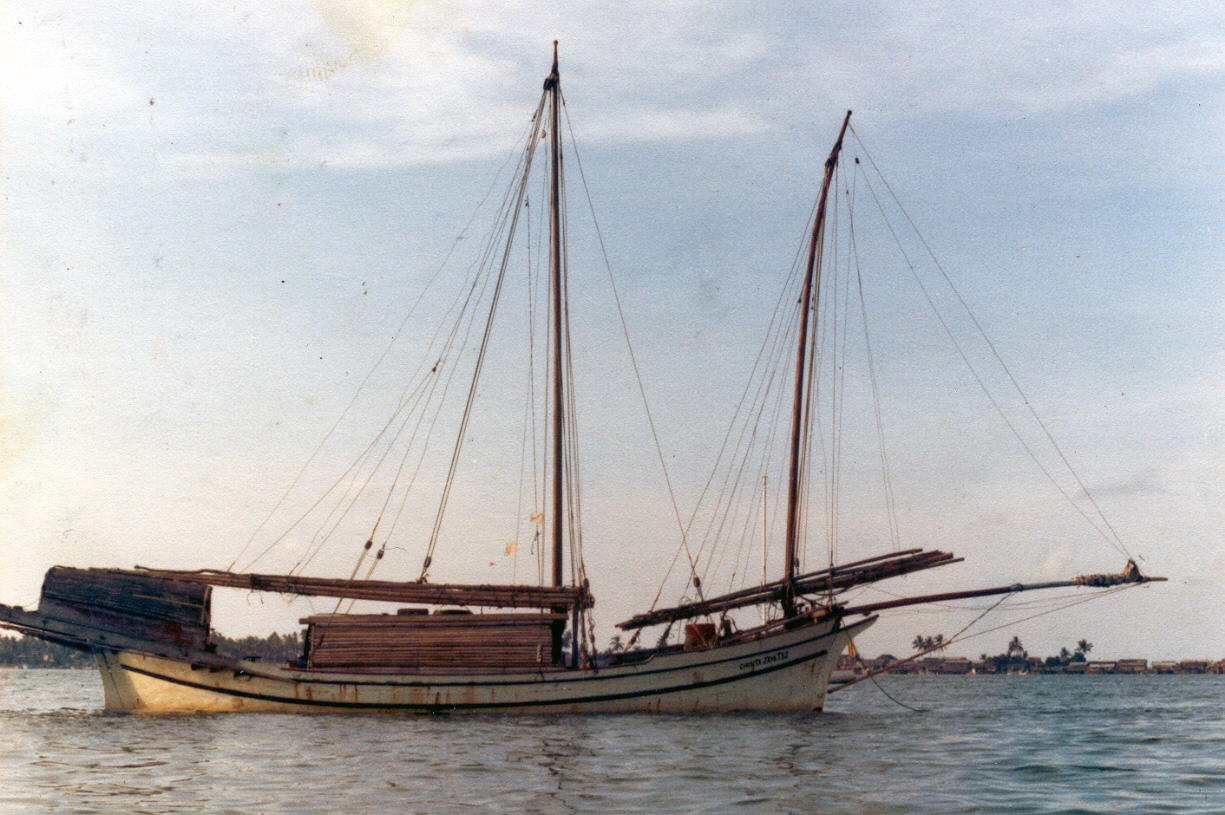
The Cinta Jaya, a 45' (LOD) working bedar in the estuary of the Terengganu river, 1980

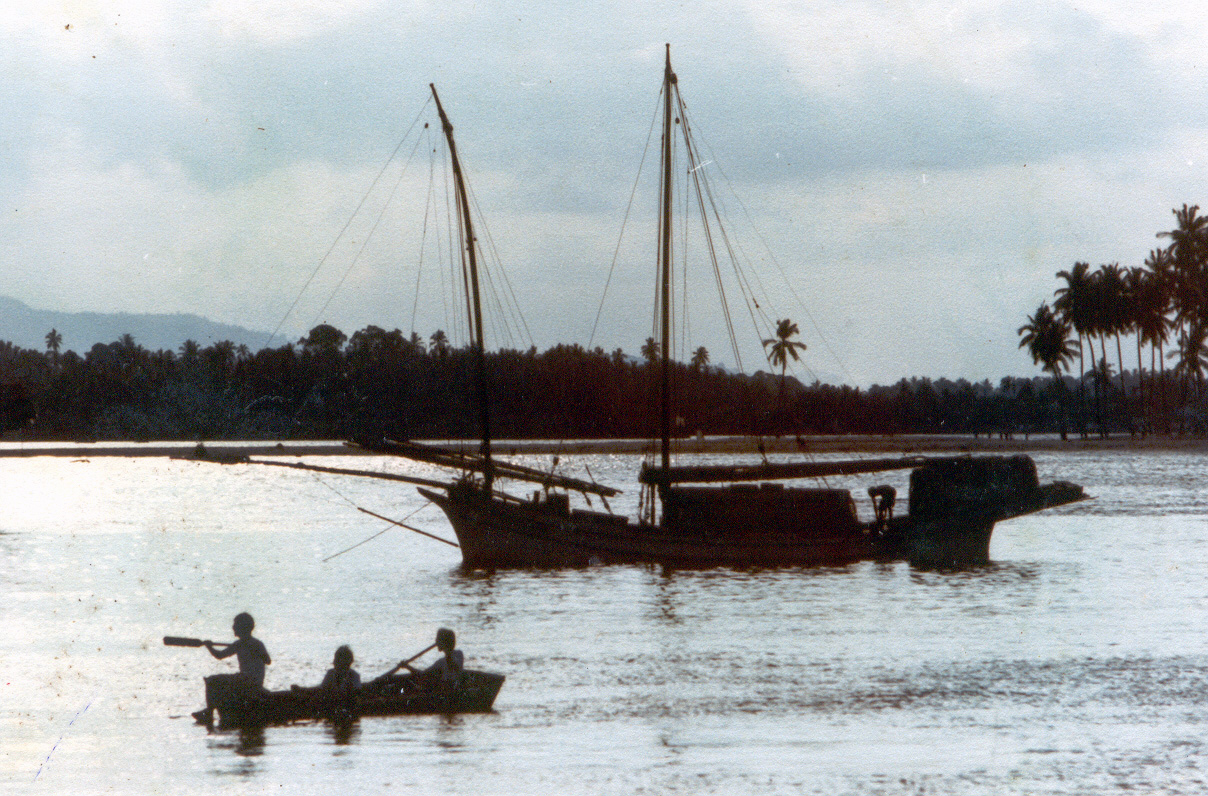
The Cinta Jaya, 1980, sitting in front of Pulau Duyong

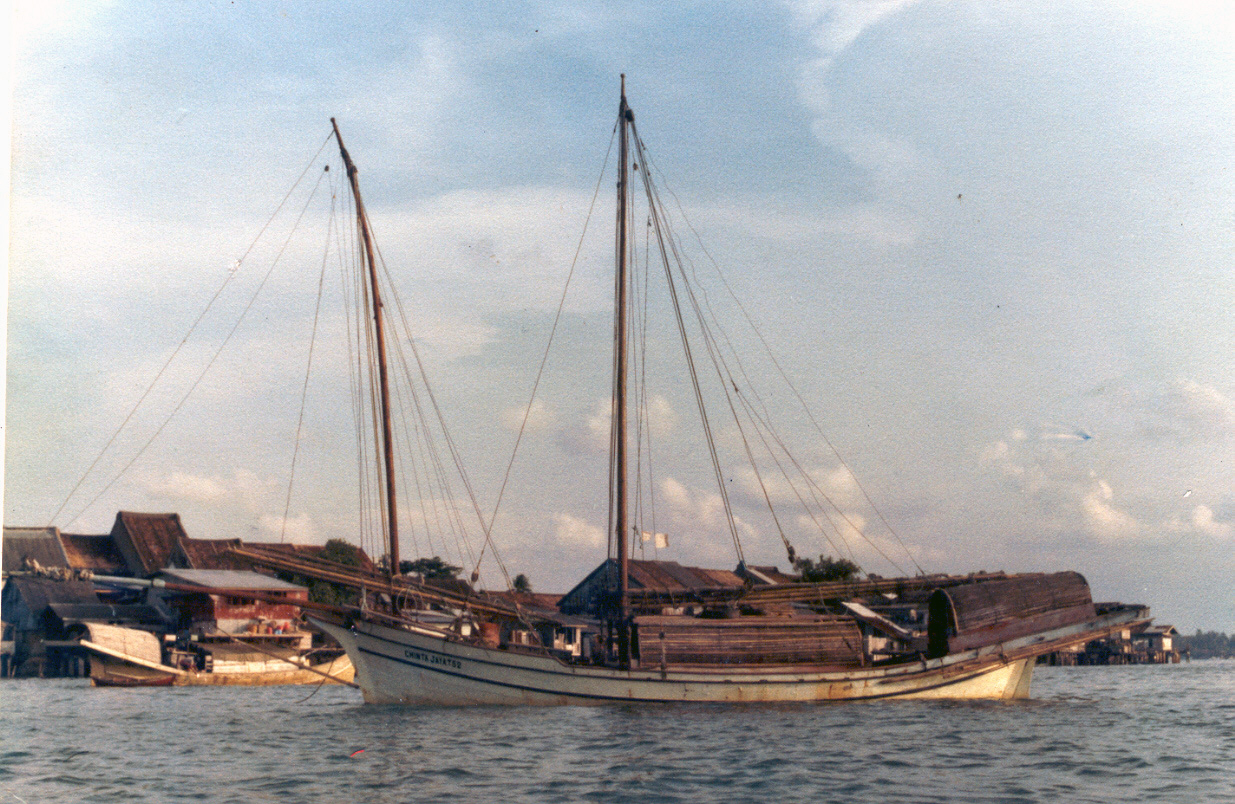
Two working bedars both about 45' (LOD) sitting in front of Chinatown in Kuala Terengganu, waiting to unload their cargo, 1980

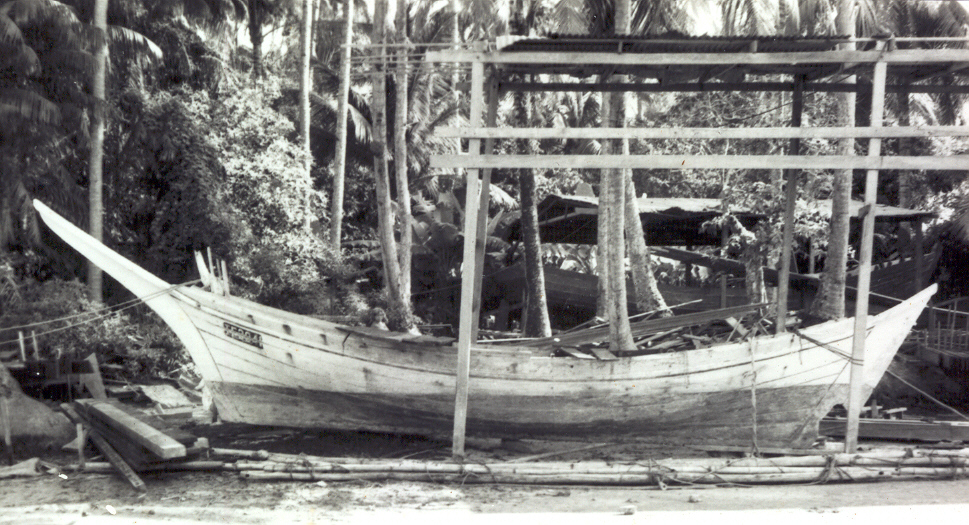
A very old bedar (28') waiting to be repaired, Duyong island, 1979

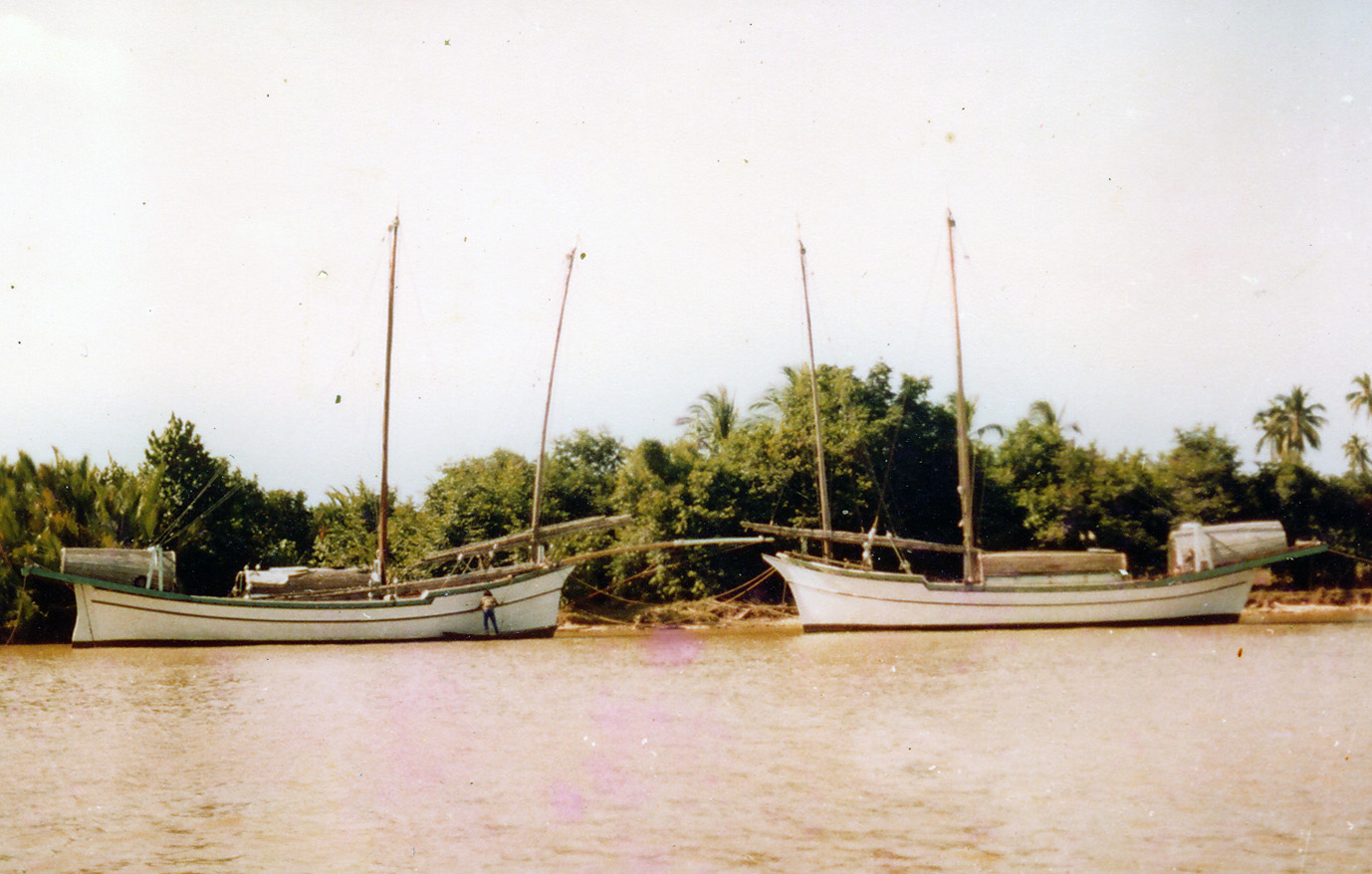
Two working bedars (both about 45' LOD) waiting for the season to sail up to Thailand on a salt run, Terengganu, 1980

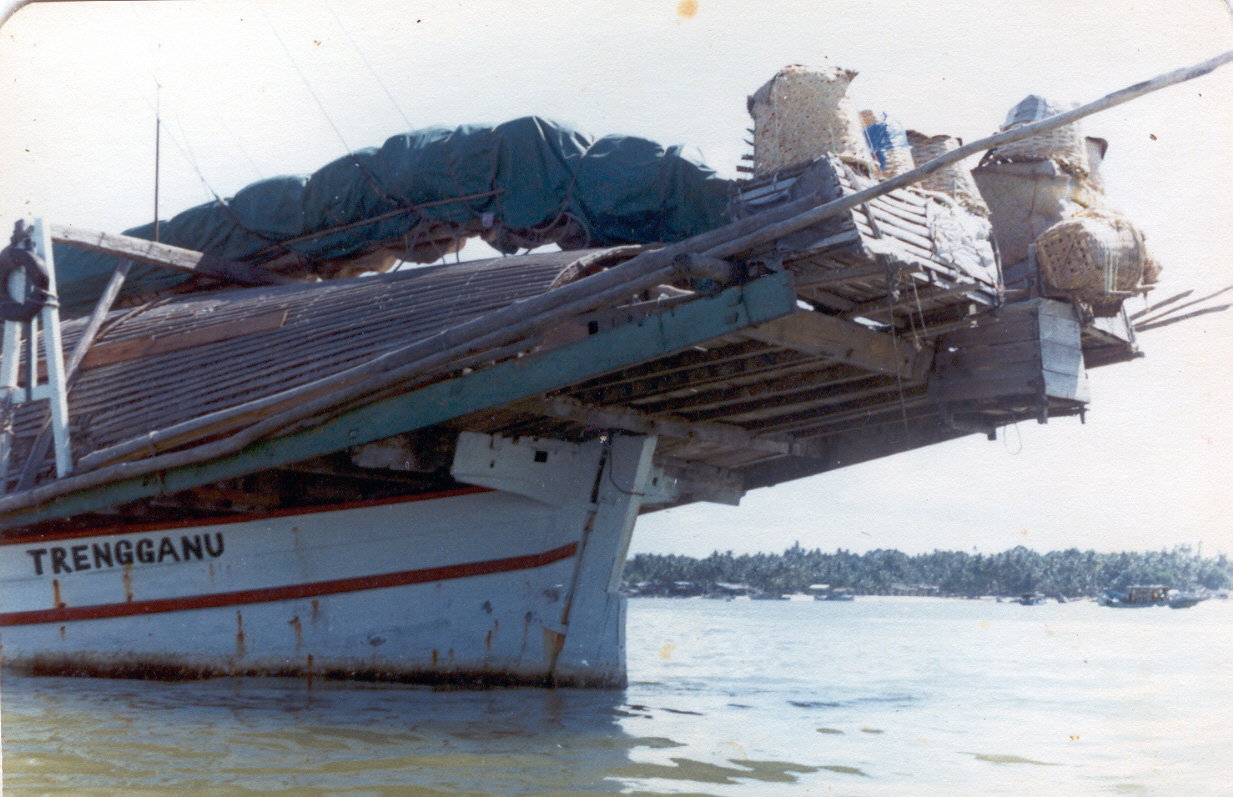
Detail of overhanging stern poop deck (dandan) of a traditional working bedar, the Dapat 86'/26 m (LOD), 1980

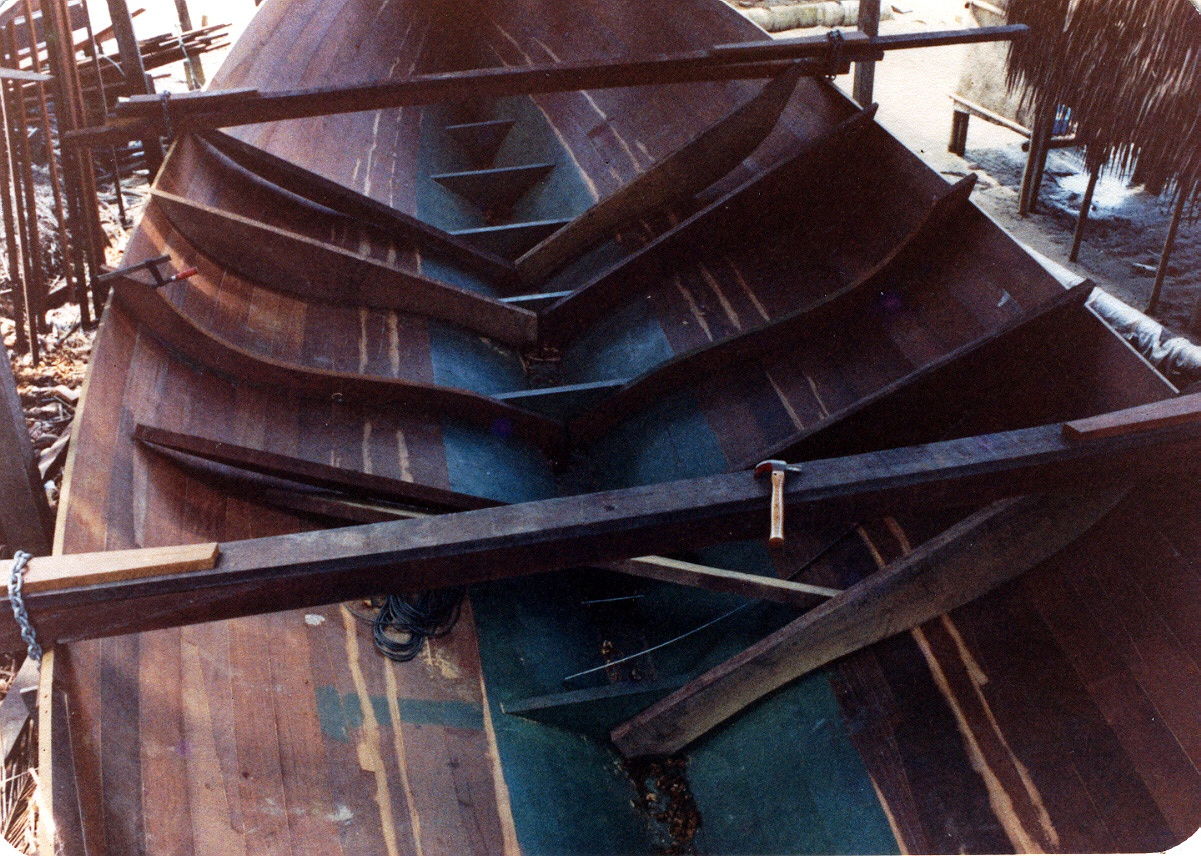
Building the bedar Naga Pelangi, fitting the frames, Duyong, 1981

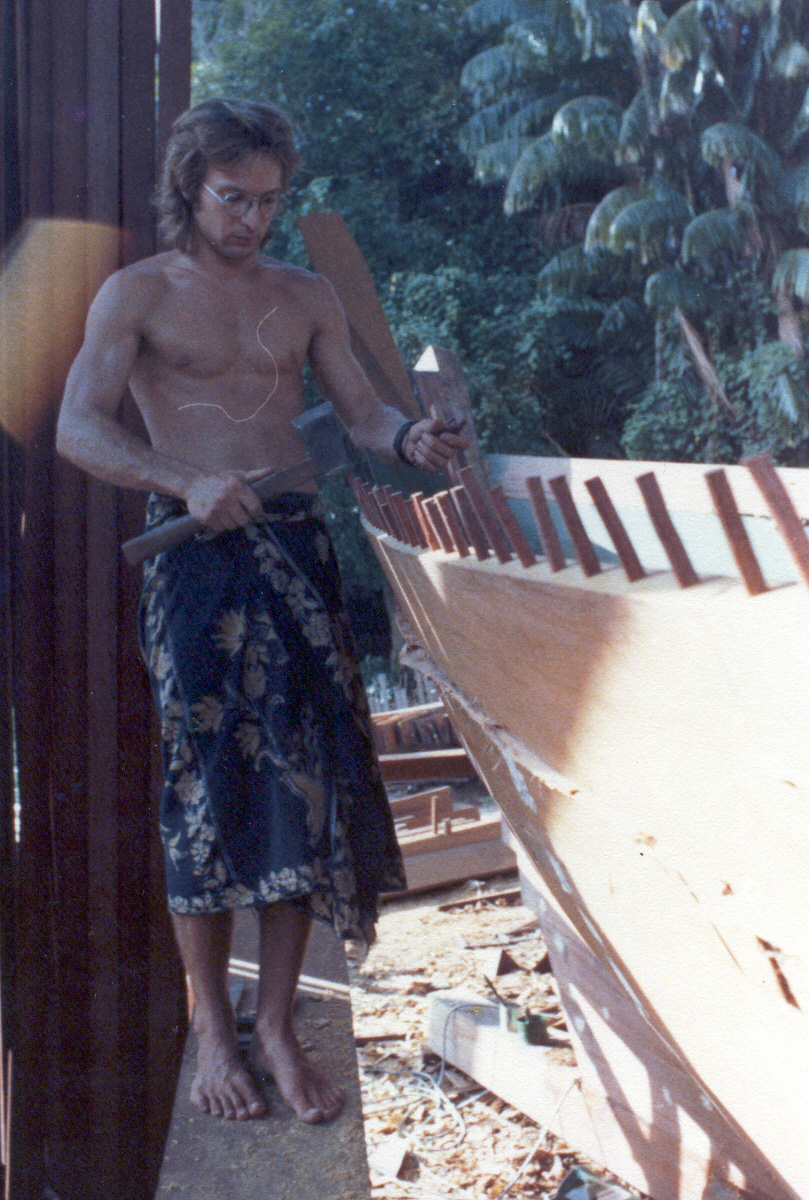
The owner of the Naga Pelangi lending a hand, Duyong 1981

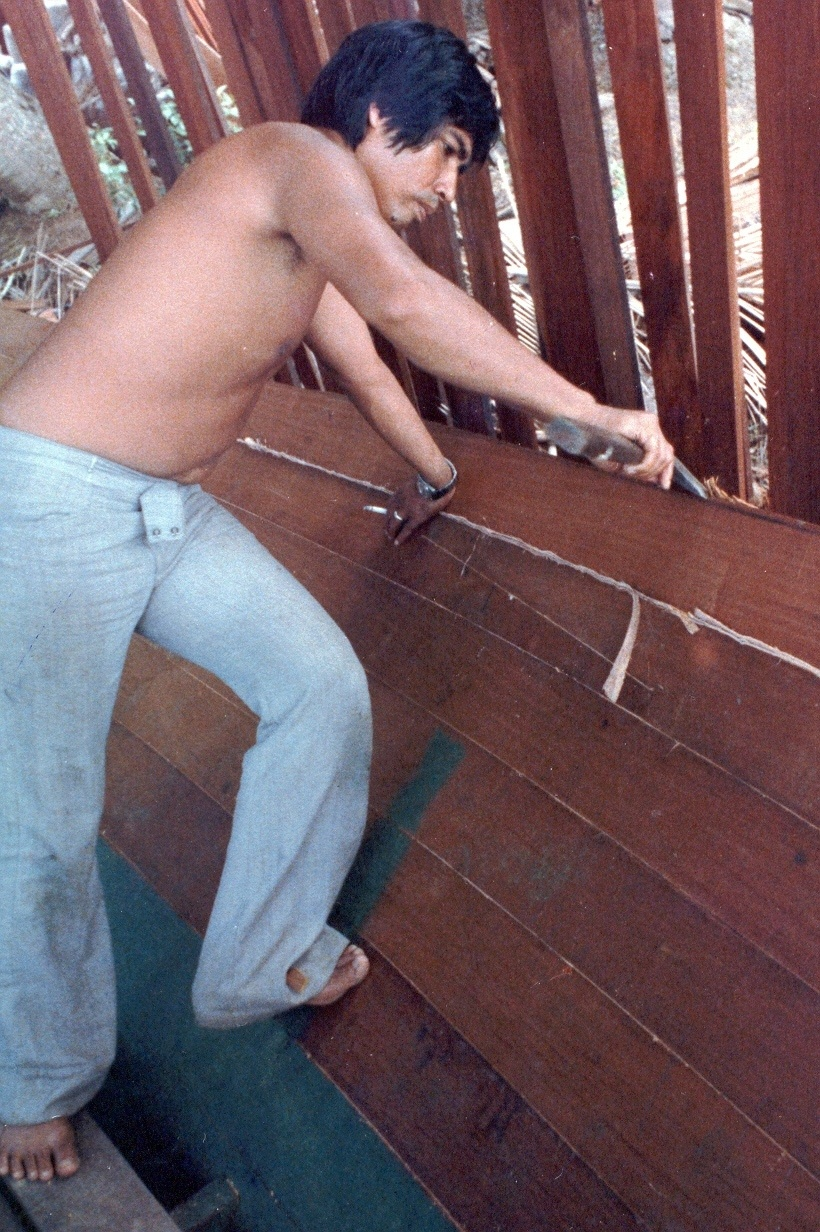
Hasni Ali building the bedar Naga Pelangi, Duyong, 1981

== See also ==
- List of schooners
- Pinas (ship)
- Junk (ship)
- Junk rig
- Junk Keying
- Lorcha (boat)
- Tongkang
- Toop
