= Sack of Singapore =

Sack of Singapore in 1398 by Majapahit

Sack of Singapura
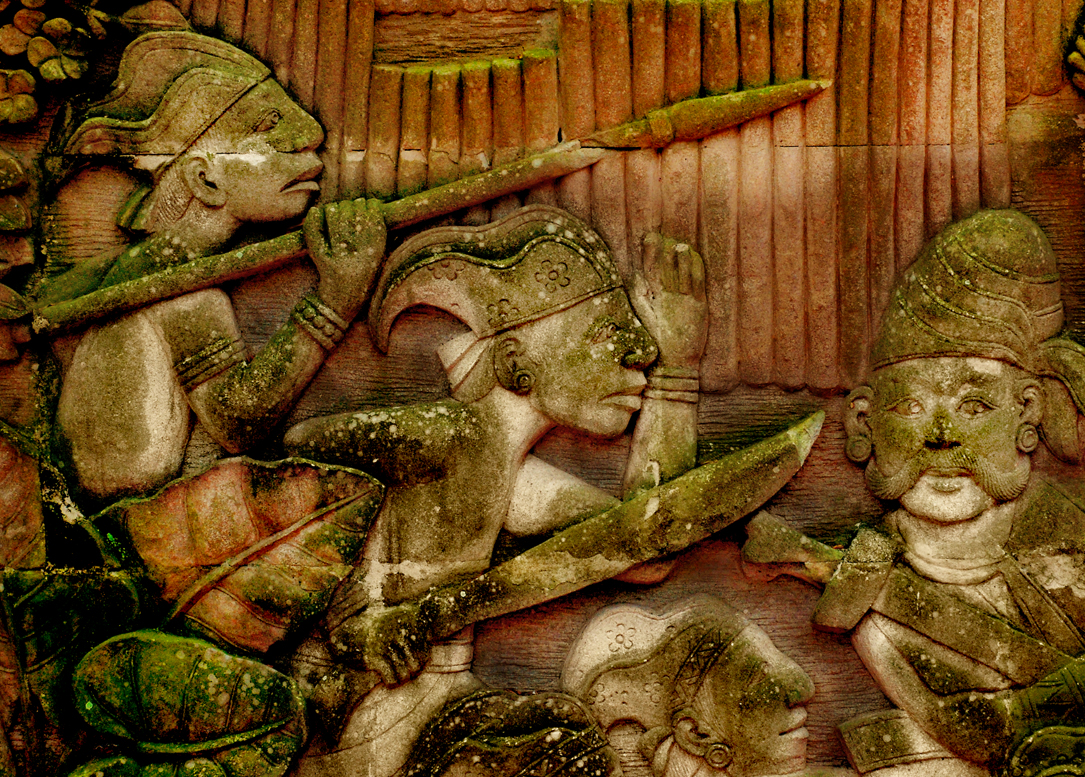
- Depiction of Malay warriors of ancient Singapura on a relief in Fort Canning Park.
Date	1398
Location	Singapore
Result	Majapahit victory; Parameswara and his followers fled to Malay Peninsula
Territorial changes	Kingdom of Singapura was conquered by Majapahit

Belligerents
Majapahit Empire; Singaporean defector	Singapura Kingdom

Commanders and leaders
Vikramavardhana; Sang Rajuna Tapa	Parameswara

Strength
200,000; 300 Djong; Hundreds small vessels (of kelulus, pelang, and jongkong)	Unknown

Casualties and losses
Unknown	Almost all were massacred (including civilians)

The Malay Annals reports the invasion and subsequent sacking of Singapore that occurred in 1398 by Majapahit forces. The battle lasted for a few months, eventually ending in victory for Majapahit. The town of Singapura was destroyed and massacred.

Before the sacking, Parameswara, the last king of Singapura and his followers fled to the Malay Peninsula and established a new state, the Malacca Sultanate.

== Background ==
=== First attempt to invade Singapore ===
In 1347, Sang Nila Utama was succeeded by Sri Wikrama Wira. The increasingly powerful Javanese kingdom of Majapahit, the successor of Singhasari, began eyeing the growing influence of the tiny island kingdom. Under the leadership of its ambitious warlord, Gajah Mada, Majapahit started to embark on overseas expansions against all kingdoms of the Malay Archipelago. In 1350, Hayam Wuruk ascended to the throne of Majapahit and the new king sent an envoy to Singapura demanding the submission of the kingdom. Wikrama Wira refused to do so and even sent a symbolic message threatening to shave the Majapahit king's head should he proceed to Singapura.

The furious Majapahit king ordered an invasion with a fleet of 100 main warships (jong) and many smaller vessels under the command of Damang Wiraja. The fleet passed through the island of Bintan, from where the news spread to Singapura. The defenders immediately assembled 400 warboats to face the invasion. Both sides clashed on the coast of Singapura in a battle that took place over three days and three nights. Many were killed on both sides and in the evening of the third day, the Javanese were driven back to their ships.

=== Palembang rebellion ===
According to Portuguese accounts, Parameswara was a prince from Palembang who attempted to challenge Javanese rule over Palembang sometime after 1360. The Javanese then attacked and drove Parameswara out of Palembang but he escaped to Singapura, and was welcomed by its ruler with the title 'Sang Aji' named Sangesinga. Parameswara assassinated the local ruler after 8 days, then ruled Singapura for 5 years with the help of the Çelates or Orang Laut.

== Invasion ==
As mentioned in the Malay Annals, the story of the fall of Singapura and the flight of its last king begins with Parameswara's accusing one of his concubines of adultery. As punishment, the king had her stripped naked in public. In revenge, the concubine's father, Sang Rajuna Tapa who was also an official in Parameswara's court, secretly sent a message to the king of Majapahit, pledging his support should the king choose to invade Singapura. In 1398, Majapahit dispatched a fleet of 300 jong and hundreds of smaller vessels (of kelulus, pelang, and jongkong), and carrying no fewer than 200,000 men.

The Javanese soldiers engaged with the defenders in a battle outside the fortress, before forcing them to retreat behind the walls. The invasion force laid siege to the city and repeatedly tried to attack the fortress. However the fortress proved to be impregnable. After about a month passed, the food in the fortress began to run low and the defenders were on the verge of starvation. Sang Rajuna Tapa was then asked to distribute whatever grain left to the people from the royal store. Seeing this opportunity for revenge, the minister lied to the King, saying the stores were empty. The grain was not distributed and the people eventually starved. The final assault came when the gates were finally opened under the order of the minister. Knowing that defeat was imminent, Parameswara and his followers fled the island. The Majapahit soldiers rushed into the fortress and a terrible massacre ensued. According to the Malay Annals, "blood flowed like a river" and the red stains on the laterite soil of Singapore are said to be blood from that massacre.

== Aftermath ==
Parameswara and his followers fled to the west coast of Malay Peninsula. After they arrived at Bertam River, Parameswara established a new city called Malaka. He established Malacca as an international port by compelling passing ships to call there, and establishing fair and reliable facilities for warehousing and trade.

== Bibliography ==
- Ahmad, A. Samad (1979), Sulalatus Salatin (Sejarah Melayu), Dewan Bahasa dan Pustaka, ISBN 983-62-5601-6, archived from the original on 2013-10-12
- Abshire, Jean E. (2011), The History of Singapore, Greenwood, ISBN 978-0-313-37742-6
- Keng, Cheah Boon; Ismail, Abdul Rahman Haji, eds. (1998), Sejarah Melayu The Malay Annals MS RAFFLES No. 18 Edisi Rumi Baru/New Romanised Edition, Academic Art & Printing Services Sdn. Bhd.
- Leyden, John (1821), Malay Annals (translated from the Malay language), Longman, Hurst, Rees, Orme and Brown
- Miksic, John N. (2013), Singapore and the Silk Road of the Sea, 1300–1800, NUS Press, ISBN 978-9971-69-574-3
- Nugroho, Irawan Djoko (2011), Majapahit Peradaban Maritim, Suluh Nuswantara Bakti, ISBN 978-602-9346-00-8
- Sabrizain, Palembang Prince or Singapore Renegade?
- Tsang, Susan; Perera, Audrey (2011), Singapore at Random, Didier Millet, ISBN 978-981-4260-37-4
- Windstedt, Richard Olaf (1938), "The Malay Annals or Sejarah Melayu", Journal of the Malayan Branch of the Royal Asiatic Society, XVI, Singapore: Printers Limited: 1–226
- Ricklefs, M.C. (1993). A History of Modern Indonesia Since c.1300 (2nd ed.). London: MacMillan. ISBN 0-333-57689-6.
