= Johor State Route J126 =

Road in Malaysia

Johor Route 126
- Jalan Parit Sulong–Tongkang Pechah
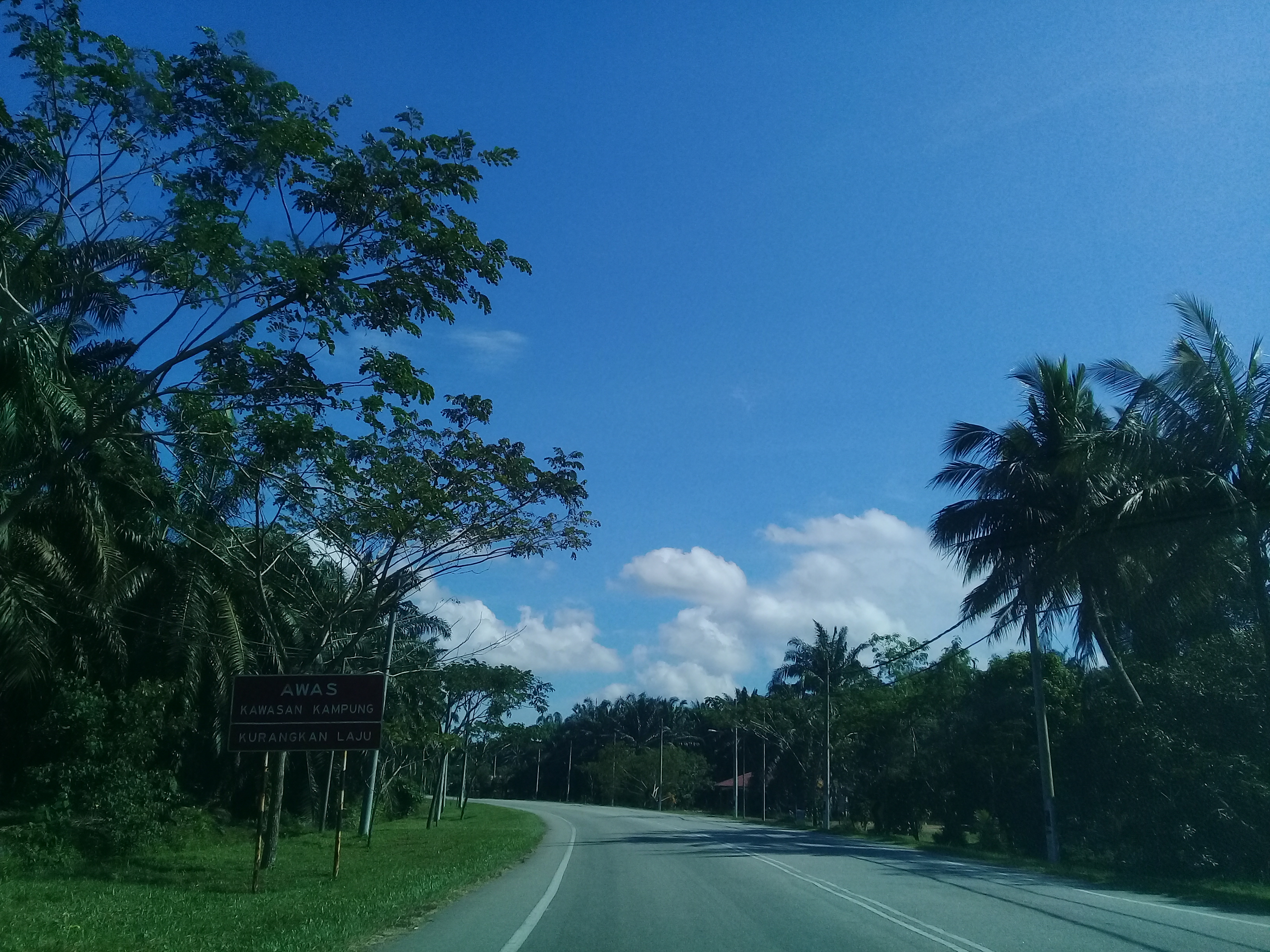

Major junctions
- Northwest end: Parit Sulong
- FT 24 Federal Route 24; J13 State Route J13
- East end: Tongkang Pechah

Location
- Country: Malaysia
- Primary destinations: Kampung Parit Jalil, Batu Pahat

Highway system
- Highways in Malaysia; Expressways; Federal; State

Johor State Route J126, Jalan Parit Sulong–Tongkang Pechah is a major road in Johor, Malaysia.

== Junction lists ==
The entire route is located in Batu Pahat District, Johor.

Legend:

- I/C - Interchange, I/S - Intersection, RSA - Rest and service area, OBR - Overhead bridge restaurant, R/R - Restaurant and rest plaza, L/B - Layby, V/P - Vista point, TN - tunnel, T/P - Toll plaza, BR - Bridge
- C - Cloverleaf, S - Stack, T-A - Trumpet-A, T-B - Trumpet-B, DT - Directional-T/Y, SDT - Semi-Directional-T/Y, P-Y - Partial-Y, D - Diamond, P-C - Partial cloverleaf, D-D - Diverging diamond, D-R - Direct ramp

Location	km	mi	Name	Destinations	Notes
Parit Sulong			Parit Sulong	FT 24 Malaysia Federal Route 24 – Muar, Parit Sulong, Yong Peng; North–South Expressway Southern Route / AH2 – Kuala Lumpur, Johor Bahru	T-junctions
Parit Sulong			Kampung Parit Jalil		
Tongkang Pechah			Tongkang Pechah	J13 Johor State Route J13 – Yong Peng, Batu Pahat; North–South Expressway Southern Route / AH2 – Kuala Lumpur, Johor Bahru	T-junctions
1.000 mi = 1.609 km; 1.000 km = 0.621 mi
