= Johor State Route J13 =

Road in Malaysia

Johor Route 13
- Jalan Tongkang Pechah
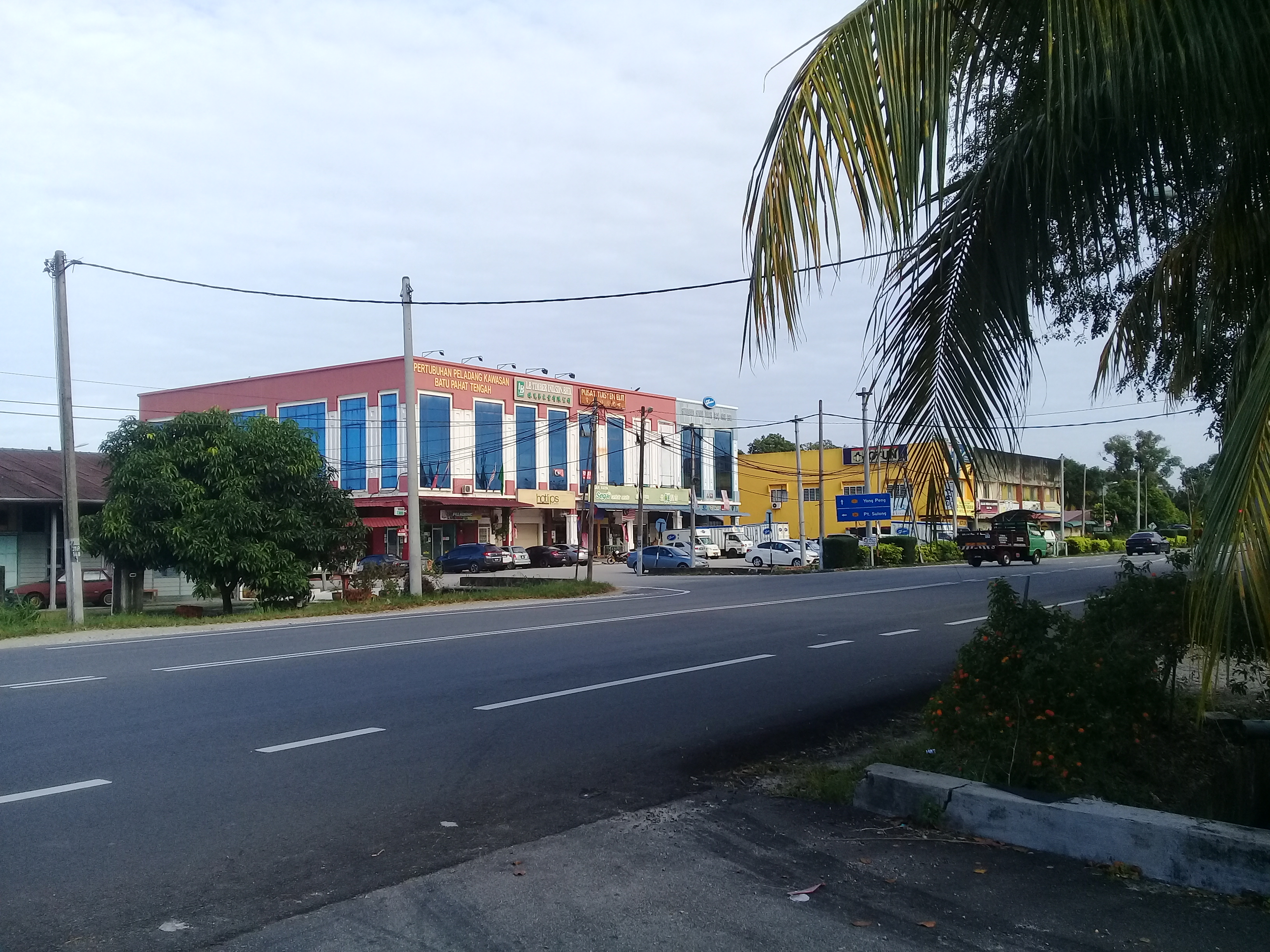

Major junctions
- North end: Jalan Parit Sulong
- FT 24 Federal Route 24; FT 5 Federal Route 5
- South end: Batu Pahat

Location
- Country: Malaysia
- Primary destinations: Tongkang Pechah

Highway system
- Highways in Malaysia; Expressways; Federal; State

Jalan Tongkang Pechah (Johor State Route J13) is a major road in Johor, Malaysia.

== Junction lists ==
The entire route is located in Batu Pahat District, Johor.

Location	km	mi	Name	Destinations	Notes
Bukit Belah			Jalan Parit Sulong	FT 24 Malaysia Federal Route 24 – Muar, Malacca City, Pagoh, Parit Sulong, Yong Peng, Segamat; North–South Expressway Southern Route / AH2 – Kuala Lumpur, Johor Bahru	T-junctions
Bukit Belah			Kampung Sri Binjal		
Bukit Belah			Munchy biscuit factory (Formerly Hwa Tai)	Munchy biscuit factory (Formerly Hwa Tai)	
Tongkang Pechah			Tongkang Pechah	J126 Jalan Parit Sulong–Tongkang Pechah – Parit Sulong	T-junctions
Tongkang Pechah			Jalan Bindu	J200 Jalan Bindu – Kampung Bindu	T-junctions
Tongkang Pechah			Tongkang Pechah bridge Sungai Simpang Kanan		
Batu Pahat			Tasik Merdeka	Tasik Merdeka – Wet World water theme park Batu Pahat	
Batu Pahat			Kampung Batu Pasir		
Batu Pahat			Jalan Tan Swee Hoe	Jalan Tan Swee Hoe	T-junctions
Batu Pahat			Kampung Lok Piak		
Batu Pahat			Batu Pahat; The Summit Batu Pahat	FT 5 Malaysia Federal Route 5 – Malacca City, Muar, Parit Jawa, Ayer Hitam, Kluang, Mersing, Pulau Tioman, Senggarang, Rengit, Pontian, Johor Bahru, Kukup; Jalan Zabedah – Batu Pahat town centre	Junctions
1.000 mi = 1.609 km; 1.000 km = 0.621 mi
