= Pilang =

Pilang can refer to:

- Pilang, an alternate name for the pelang, an outrigger boat from Indonesia and Malaysia
- Pilang, an alternate name for the vinta, an outrigger canoe from the Philippines
