= Pelang =

Traditional boat from Indonesia and Malaysia

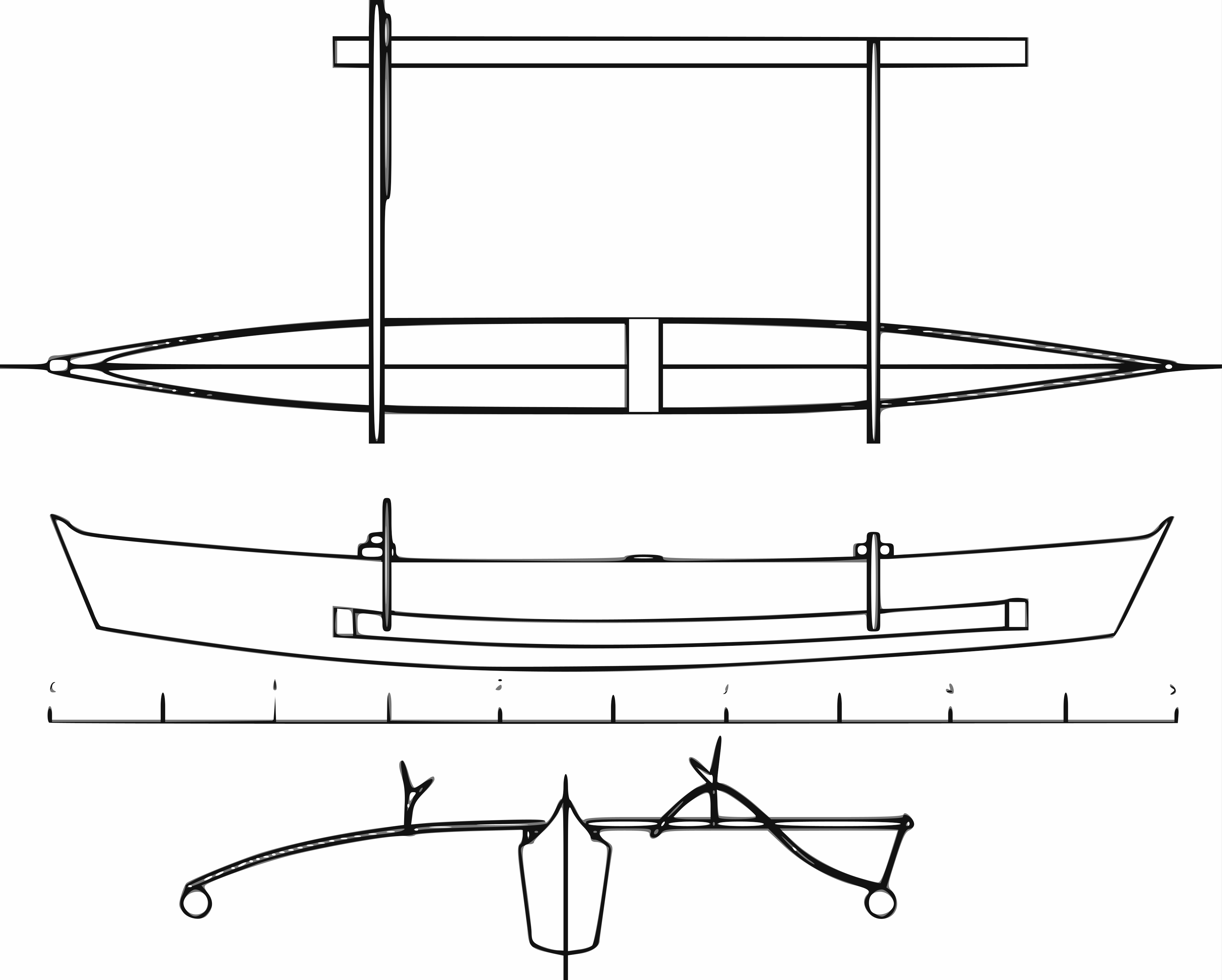
A small pelang (5 m in length) with marine plywood for its side planks.

Pelang or pilang is a traditional boat from Indonesia and Malaysia. It may refer to several different types of boats in the Nusantara, but commonly they refer to an outrigger canoe. The function differs from where they were used, from transporting people, fishing, to trading. Pilang has been known from at least the 14th century.

== Etymology ==
The name "pelang" can be traced from Old Javanese word pelang which means freight boat or a type of ancient merchant boat. The Great Indonesian Dictionary (KBBI) explains it as a "trading boat". According to M. Rafiek, a pelang is a rather large boat used to sail through the Java sea.

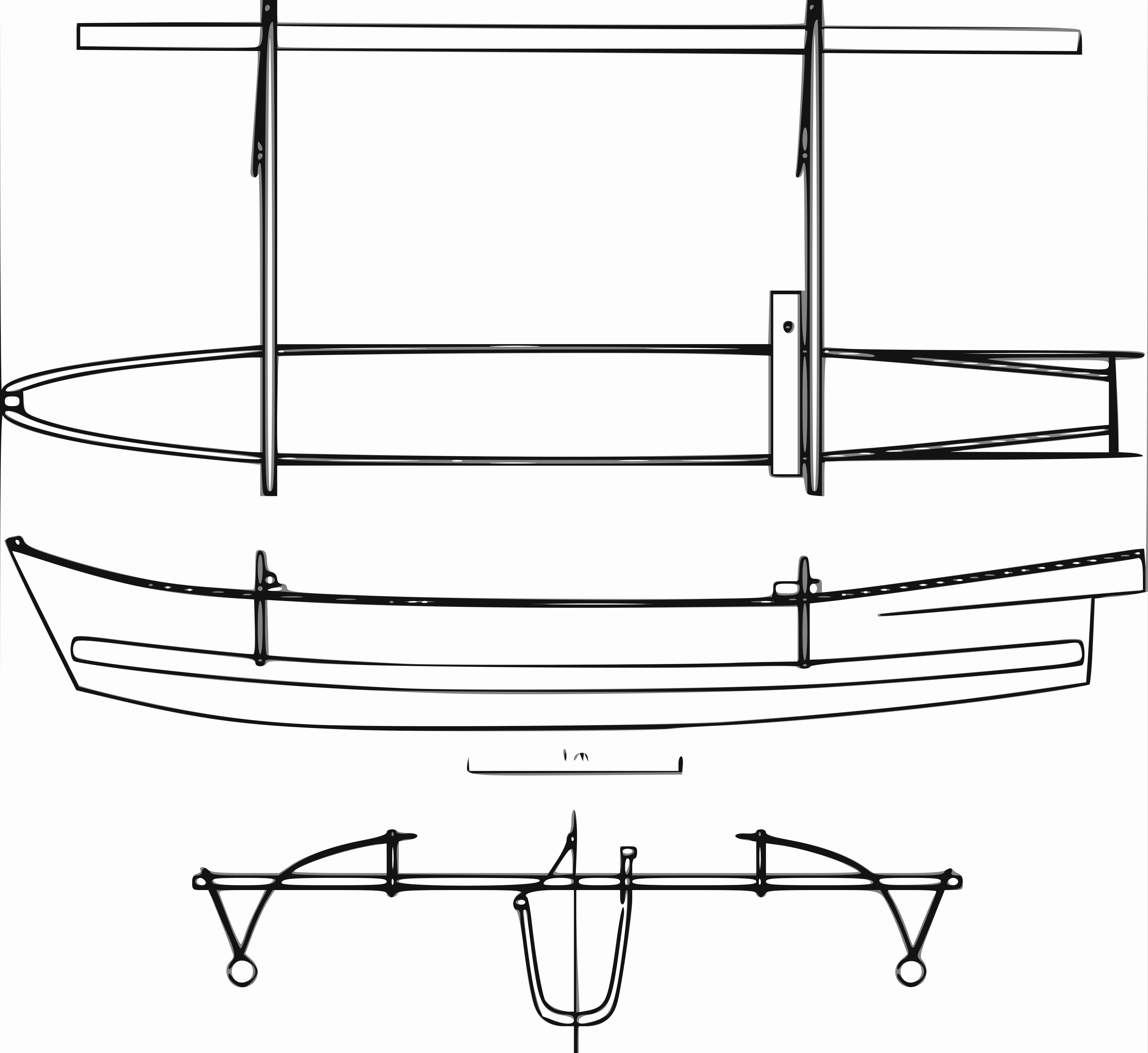
A pelang with outboard engine as its main propulsion.

In northern Sulawesi, it was originally a term for a mahera boat (mahera means dugout—the base keel made from a whole piece of hollowed wood), but with the entry of Filipino technology (see vinta), then a boat made of plywood can also be referred to as a pelang.

== Description ==
In the western part of Nusantara, it refers to a large, flat-bottomed canoe-like boat with one mast, stepping a lug sail made of cloth. Usually built of giam wood. H. Warington Smyth noted the dimensions of a pilang: About 42 ft (12.80 m) long, 5 ft (1.52 m) wide, 2 ft 3 in 2 ft 3 in (68.58 cm) draught, with 1 ft (30.48 cm) of freeboard. The capacity was 1 koyan (2.419 metric tons). The mast itself is about 40 ft (12.19 m) tall.

In Sejarah Melayu, two pilang is mentioned with size, one is 8 depa (12.8–16 m) long, the other is 12 depa (19.2–24 m) long.

In the eastern part of Nusantara, the name refers to a small, canoe-like outrigger boat. On the northern coast of Sulawesi, pelang refers to an outrigger fishing boat. North Sulawesian pelang is about 6–8 m in length, 1 m in width, and crewed by 4–6 men. This pelang has an operational range of 5–7 mi (8.05–11.27 km). The Mahera (dugout base) is a flat keel with a slight curvature. As it does not have enough height, additional side planks were added to improve the seaworthiness. They are made of marine plywood reinforced with frame construction and side beams. Modern pelang of northern Sulawesi were equipped with outboard motors. The motor gradually replaced the sail in the 1970s.

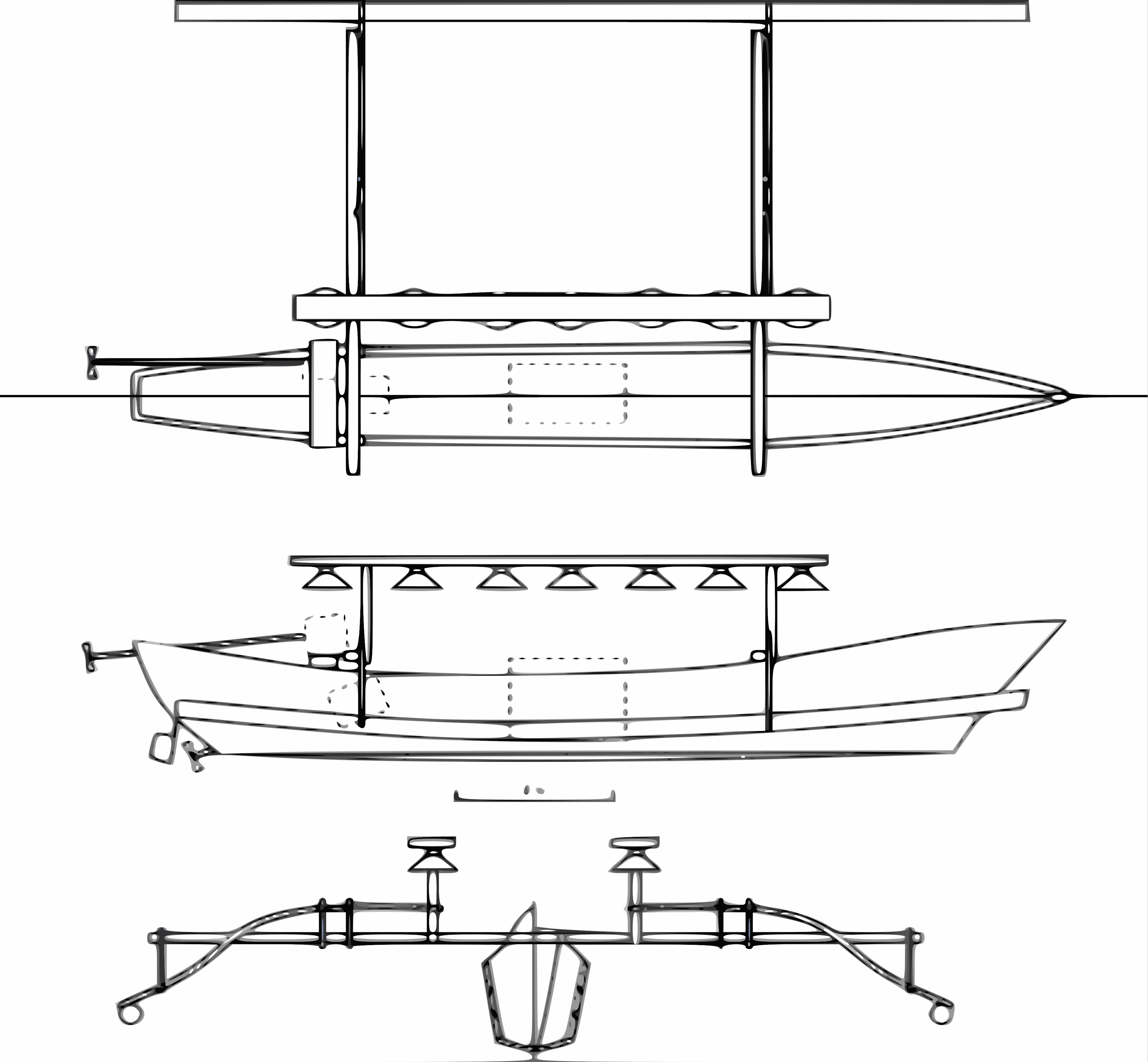
A pelang that has been fitted with lamps and generator for light fishing.

There are also pelang that are equipped with lamps and electric generators for light fishing. Lights were used to attract fish for improving the quantity of the catch. The raw material is marine plywood with a length of about 7 m.

== See also ==
- Jongkong
- Bagan, an instrument of light fishing in Indonesia
- Jukung
- Sampan panjang
- Sampan
- Lancaran
