= Shallop =

Name used for several types of boats

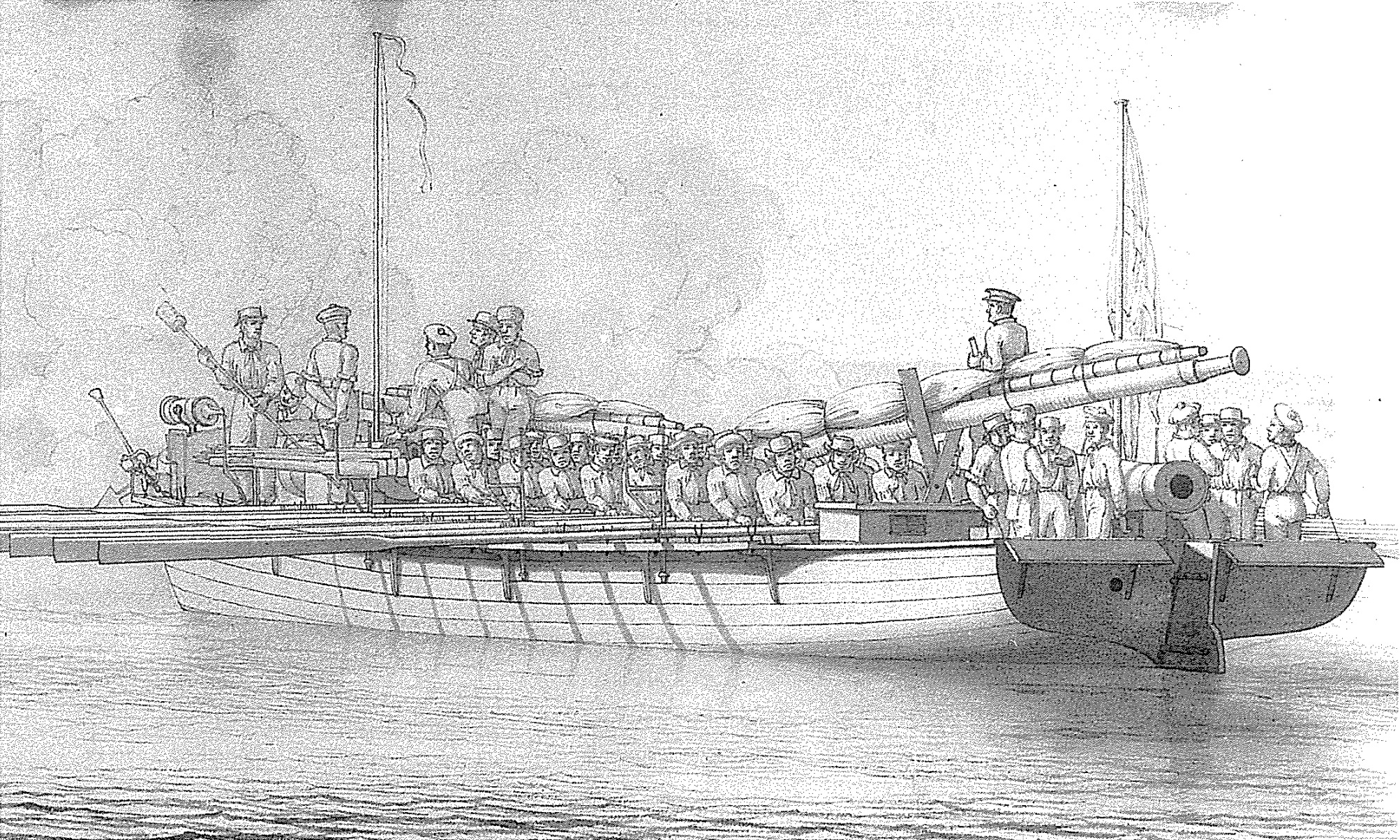
A Danish shallop gunboat of the Gunboat War

Shallop is a name used for several types of boats and small ships (French chaloupe) used for coastal navigation from the seventeenth century. Originally smaller boats based on the chalupa, the watercraft named this ranged from small boats a little larger than a banks dory to gunboats.

Smaller shallops could maneuver far up narrow creeks to take on cargo because they could reverse their sails, oars and rudder for the return trip and so did not need to turn around. The shallops used by English explorers were about 30 feet (9.1 m) long and equipped with oars and a mast with one or two sails. These larger English shallops could take over a dozen people and usually had a shallow draft of about 2 feet (0.6 m). The larger vessels of this design could carry a substantial load and be armed with cannon.

Captain John Smith used shallops to explore the Chesapeake Bay in the summer of 1608. The boats were disassembled and stowed aboard the Susan Constant, being reassembled when the colonists arrived in North America.

The Danes armed large boats called shallops for use as gunboats, particularly in the Gunboat War (1807–1814) between Denmark–Norway and the British Navy during the Napoleonic Wars.

== See also ==
- Chialoup
- Whale boat
