= Chialoup =

Type of sloop used in the East Indies

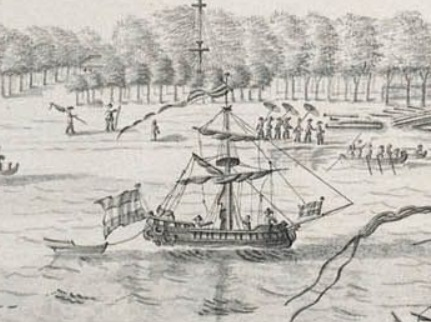
A chialoup in Cirebon, 1775.

A chialoup (or chaloup) was a type of sloop used in the East Indies, a combination of western (Dutch) and Nusantaran (Indonesian) technologies and techniques. Many of these "boat-ships" were produced by VOC shipwrights in Rembang and Juwana, where the majority of the workers were local Javanese. Chialoups were used by the Dutch East India Company and private merchant-sailors of western and Nusantaran origin.

== Description ==
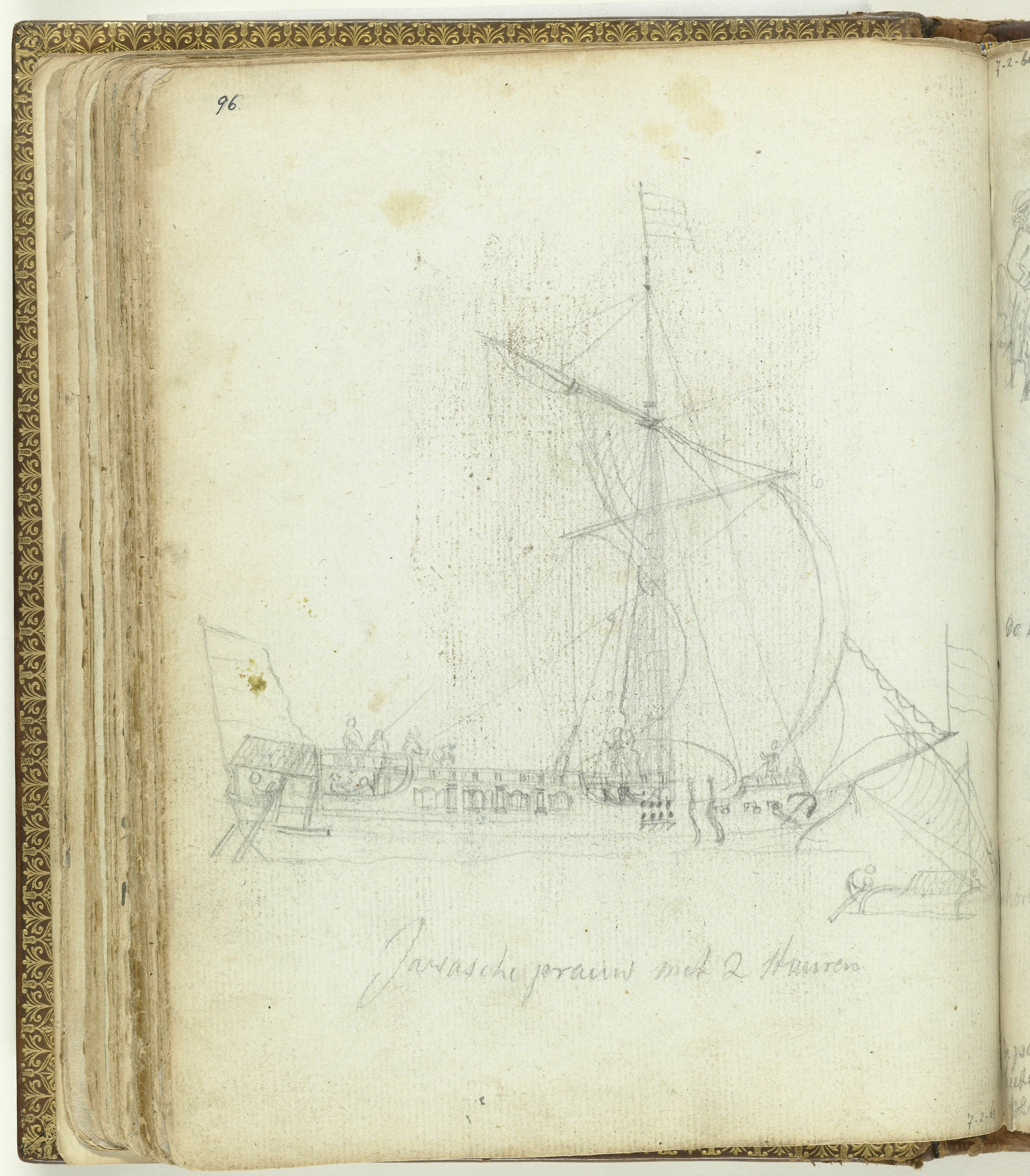
Javanese prahu with two rudders.

The chialoup sail plan mimics that used in sloops, with a combination of square-rigged and fore-and-aft sails. The boats are usually single-decked with one mast, sometimes with an added mizzen mast. While most such chialoups use a European-style central rudder, some are equipped with two side (quarter) rudders, a characteristic of Nusantaran boats. The length is between 15 and 25 meters, with a cargo bay almost 6 meters long. Depending on the size of the boat, crews run 20 to 40 people, with a typical load capacity of 72 to 144 metric tons. In the syahbandar's (harbourmaster) record of Malacca a chialoup is listed carrying up to 200 tons of cargo and a crew of 75 people. Chialoups on average were armed with 4 cannons, 1 swivel gun, and 7 snaphaunces.

In the era after 1820, chialoups gradually disappeared from the "List of Ships and Sea Vehicles from the East Indies", a periodical published by the colonial government of the Dutch East Indies, and the term chialoup appeared more rarely in newspapers, replaced with kotter, a Dutch word for a type of sloop.

== See also ==
- Sloop
- Shallop
- Kakap
- Padewakang
- Pencalang
- Toop
