= Jongkong =

Dugout canoe from Indonesia

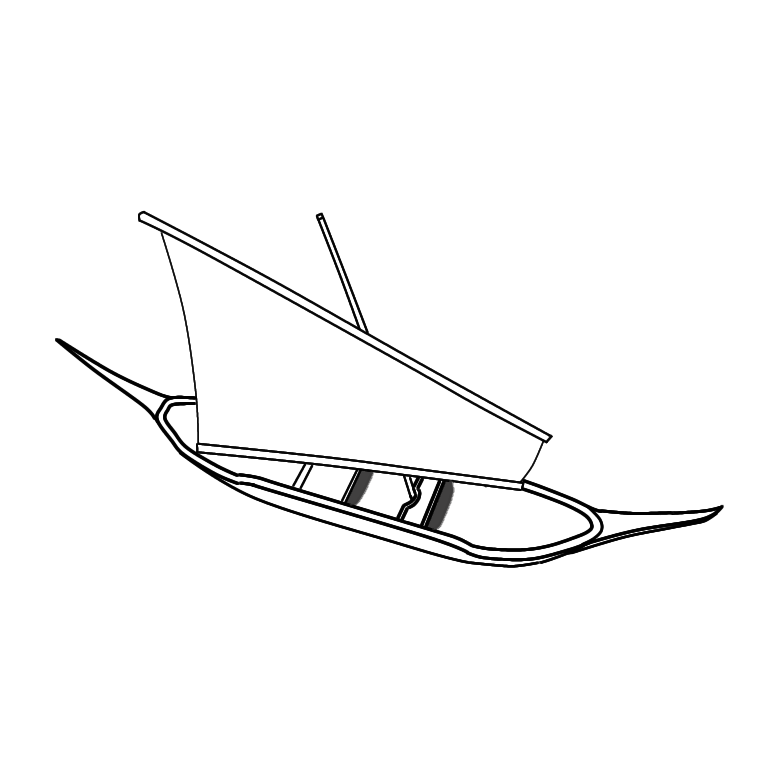
Line drawing of a jongkong from Anambas, Riau islands. Note the added plank at the side of the hull.

A jongkong is a type of dugout canoe from Maritime Southeast Asia. Jongkong was the simplest boat from Riau-Lingga area, and can be found widely though in small numbers throughout the area. The first record of jongkong comes from the Malay Annals (which was composed no earlier than the 17th century AD), being used by Majapahit empire during the first Majapahit attack on Singapura (1350) and during the fall of Singapura (1398).

== Etymology ==
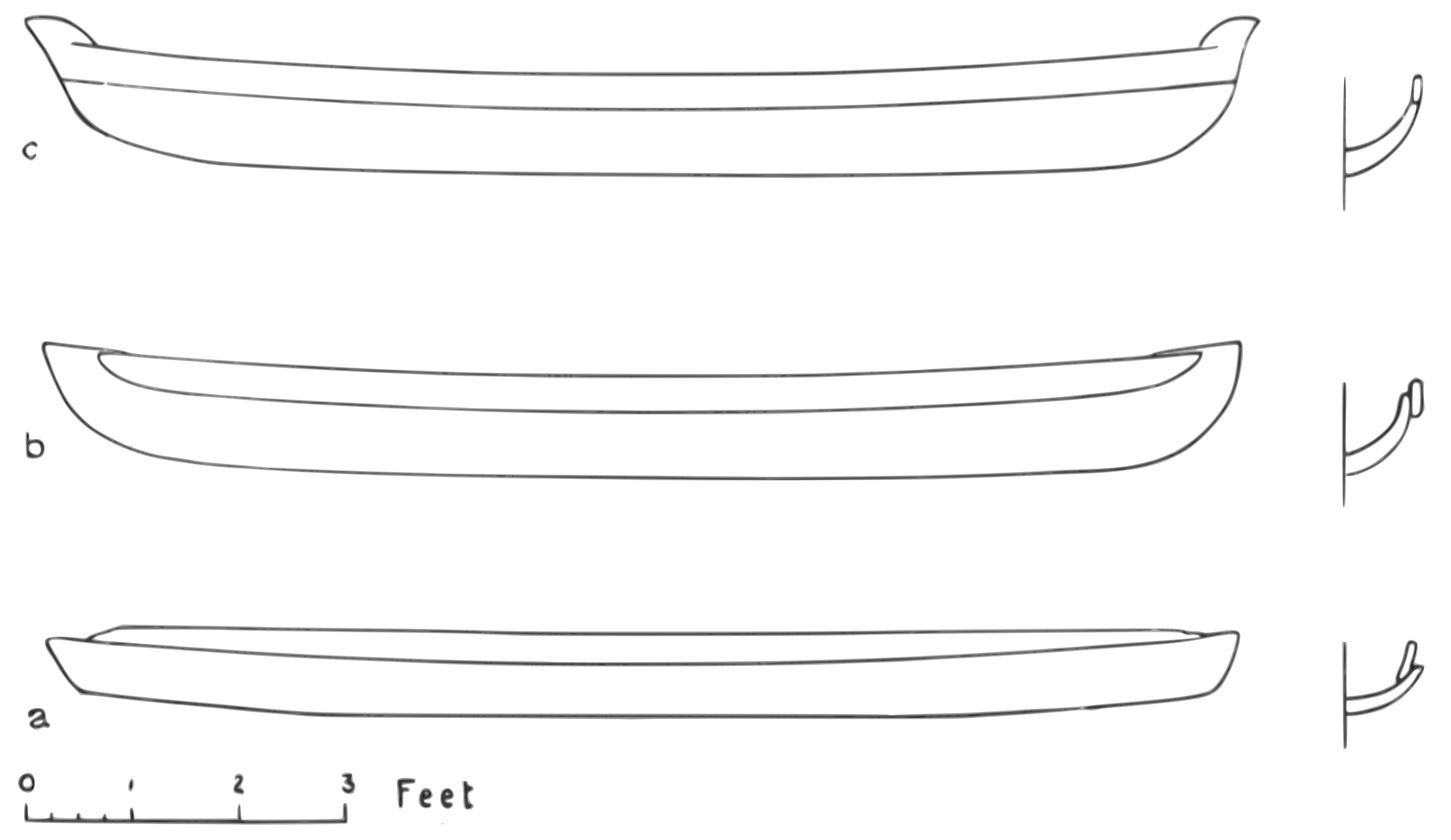
Profiles and half-sections at the mid-point of the three forms of jongkong found in the Riau-Lingga area.

The name comes from two words, that is jong and kong or jegong. Jong means a boat or sampan, no matter large or small, while kong or jegong is the place where masts are set up to hold the sail. Thus the name can be translated as a sailing boat that is used by the coastline community.

== Description ==
In this region it is essentially a small, inshore boat and it is rarely built to a length of more than about 12−14 feet (3.7−4.3 m). It is typically a one-man boat, with a length of 9−10 feet (2.7−3 m), with depth at the mid-section about 10−12 inches (25.4−30.5 cm). It consists of a dugout base, with the hull spread slightly, and the sides built up by the addition of a single plank. Larger versions have a small triangular sail, and smaller versions are usually propelled by a short, single-bladed paddle or rarely by a double-bladed paddle.

== See also ==
- Benawa
- Kakap
- Knabat bogolu
- Sampan panjang
- Kalulis
