= Tongkang =

Type of small boat in Southeast Asia

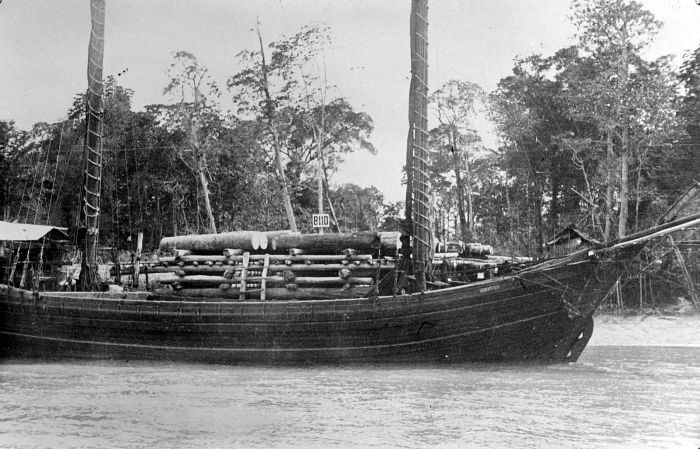
A moored tongkang in 1930

A tongkang is a boat used to carry goods along rivers and shores in Maritime Southeast Asia. One of the earliest written records of tongkangs is in the Malay Annals, which was composed no earlier than the 17th century. One passage mentions them being used by the Majapahit Empire during the 1350 attack on Singapura.

== Etymology ==
Because the majority of tongkangs were built, used, and manned by Chinese people, it is frequently assumed that the name was Chinese word. In fact, tongkang is certainly a Malay word, and probably derived from bĕlongkang (properly pĕrahu bĕlongkang, a pĕrahu jalur with strakes added to increase the freeboard), a word which was formerly used in Sumatra for a river cargo boat.

== Description ==
The tongkang was an unmotorised open cargo boat, propelled by a variety of methods, including rowing, punt poles and sail.

The early tongkangs were about 20 ton burthen or less; they were propelled by about ten rowers and guided by a steersman. Long punt poles were used to propel them in shallower water. The size of the tongkang increased around 1860.

The tongkang was one of the two traditional Malay ships using junk rig with local hulls instead of the Chinese Junk hull. Its hull design was more reminiscent of the dhow type used in South Asia and Western Asia than to the common Chinese or Far-eastern type. Besides the Junk Rig, the ketch rig was also used on the tongkang. The last tongkangs in Singapore were towed by a motorised launch.

== Types of tongkang ==
Because the term "tongkang" is applied to several type of boats, the description of each boat is not necessarily the same.

=== Malaya ===
1. Tamil-manned lighter, brought to Singapore in the 1820s.
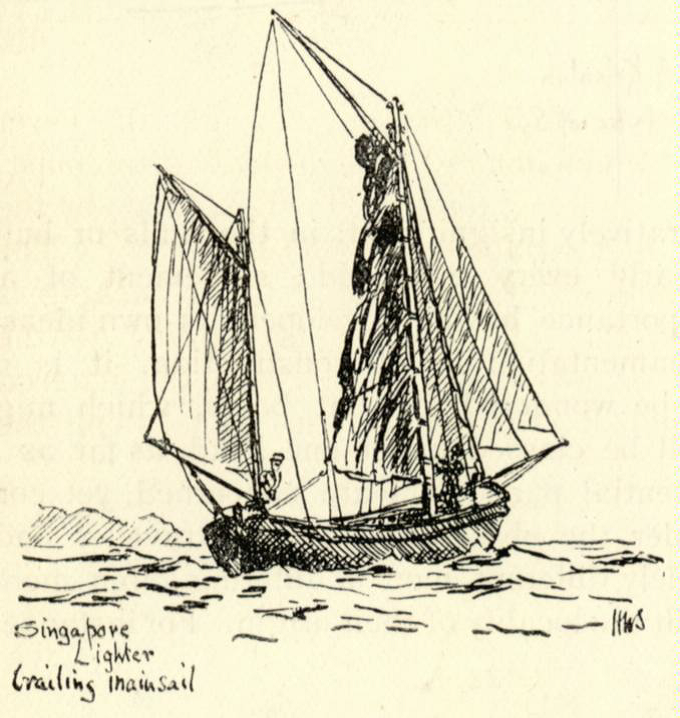
  Sketch of a Singapore lighter, with trailing mainsail, stern-side view. Ca. 1902.
2. The old Singapore sailing lighter. Originally the Tamil-manned lighter, brought to Singapore in the 1820s. Later a western-style lighter hull, double-ended, usually with a single mast setting a large loose-footed dipping lugsail, and frequently manned by Chinese. These latter boats still survive, but they are no longer propelled by sails.
3. Tongkang tunda, meaning "towed tongkang". European-style lighter hull, double-ended, usually with a single mast setting a large loose-footed dipping lugsail, and frequently manned by Chinese. These boats still survive, but they are no longer propelled by sails. Hull length is 50–80 feet (15–24 m).
4. Tongkang Melayu, manned by Malays. Typically a double-ended lighter hull, ketch-rigged with standing gaffs and two headsails. No stern gallery and a western style rudder. Some had transom sterns. The hull length is 30–75 feet (9.1–22.9 m).
5. Penang sailing lighter. Western-style lighter hull, with a transom stern and 1 mast with a large loose-footed dipping lugsail and a single headsail, or a bermuda-headed mainsail and one headsail. Formerly also double-ended, generally with 2 masts, setting a large lugsail on the mainmast. No stern gallery and a western style rudder. Normally manned by men from southern India. Hull length is 50–80 feet (15–24 m).
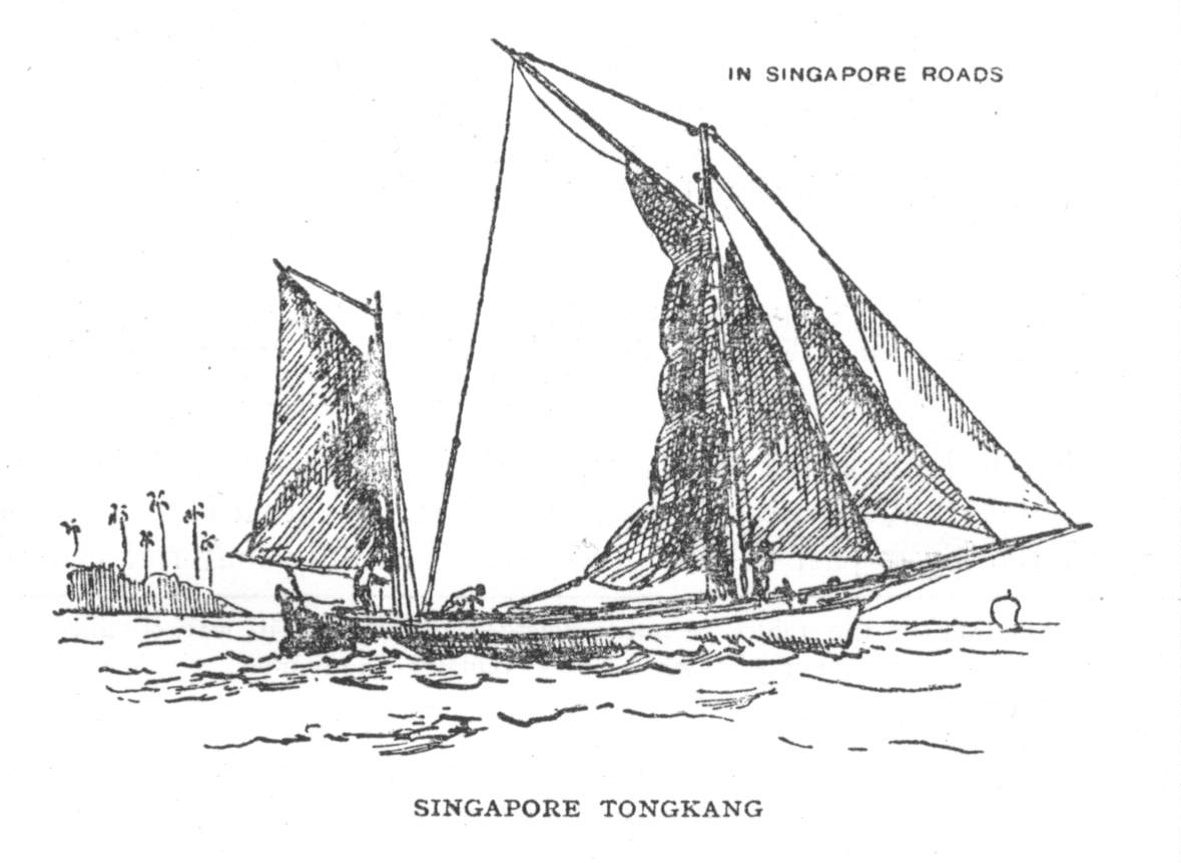
  Sketch of a tongkang in Singapore roads, 1906.
6. Singapore timber tongkang. A heavy, wide hull with a transom stern, 2 masts and with a long bowsprit. They are ketch-rigged with standing gaffs, no topsails, two or three headsails. A stern gallery and Chinese rudder. Manned by Chinese. Hull length is 85–95 feet (26–29 m).
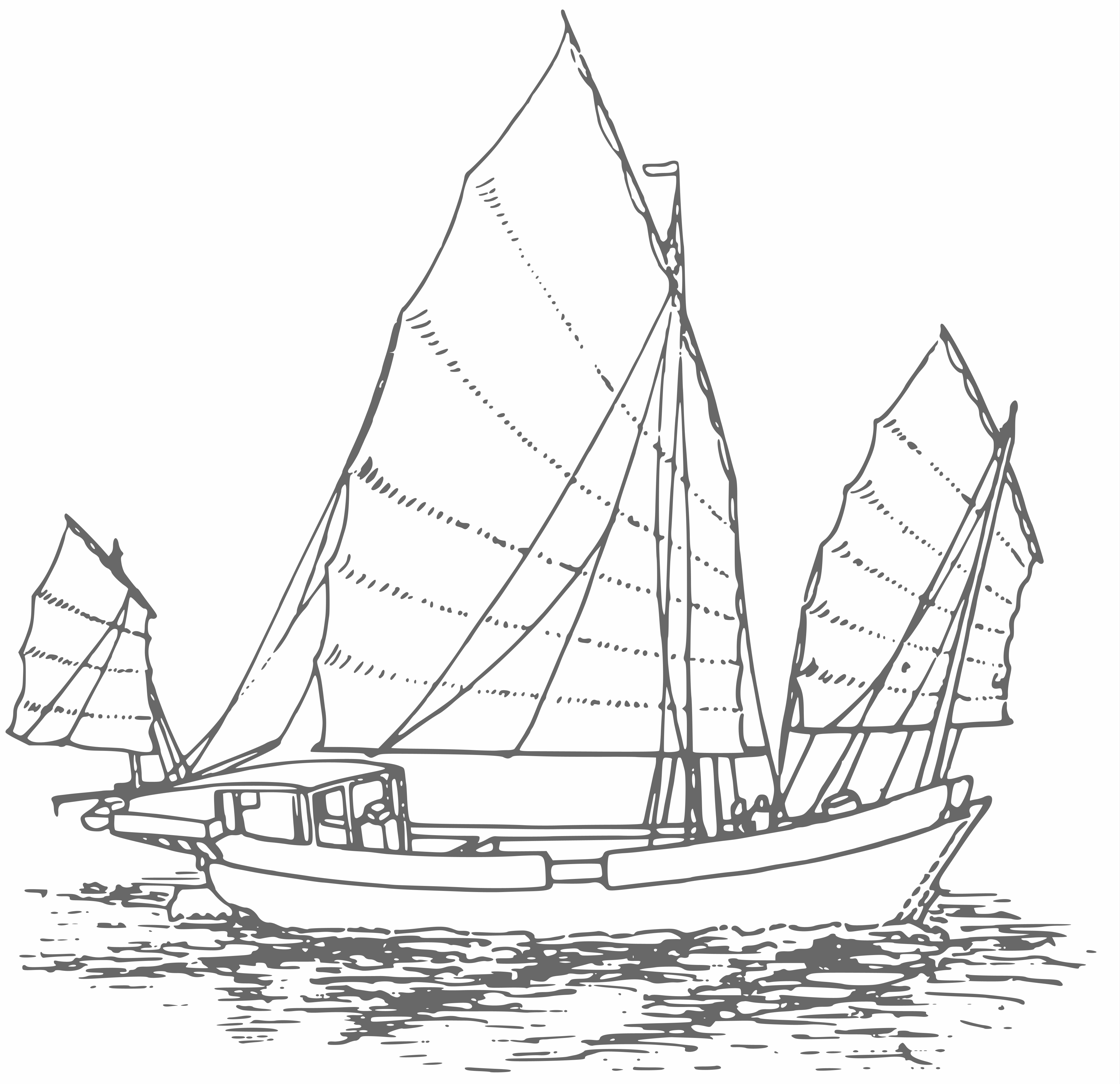
  A Singapore trader (Tongkang), lightly laden, under full sail. Singapore Strait, January, 1950.
7. Singapore trader: General purpose trading boat, now used mostly for carrying firewood. Hull similar to Singapore timber tongkang, but less beamy: stepping two or three masts, each setting a single highpeaked Chinese junk sail. Manned by Chinese. Hull length: 40–85 feet (12–26 m).

=== Brunei ===
1. Tongkang. Manned by Malays. Medium-sized, double-ended cargo boat, decked fore and aft, with a deckhouse amidship. It has a stern gallery and 1 mast, setting a square-sail or a dipping lug. Built at Sepitang and Brunei. The local cargo-carrier of Labuan Bay, occasionally found as far north as Jesselton. Hull length: 30–40 feet (9.1–12.2 m).

=== North Borneo ===
1. Tongkang Melayu. Western-style hull with transom stern, had 1 or 2 masts, each setting a large dipping lugsail. No bowsprit, usually one headsail. Steered with an unpierced rudder. This boat, which is used for collecting firewood in Sandakan Bay, is very similar to the transom-stern Penang Lighter in broad outline, though rather beamier. It is made by Banjar people on Nunuyan Laut Island, in Sandakan Bay. Hull length: 40–50 feet (12–15 m).
2. Tongkang China. The name used in the North Borneo ports for visiting Chinese junks (usually arriving from Hongkong).

== Tongkangs in Singapore ==
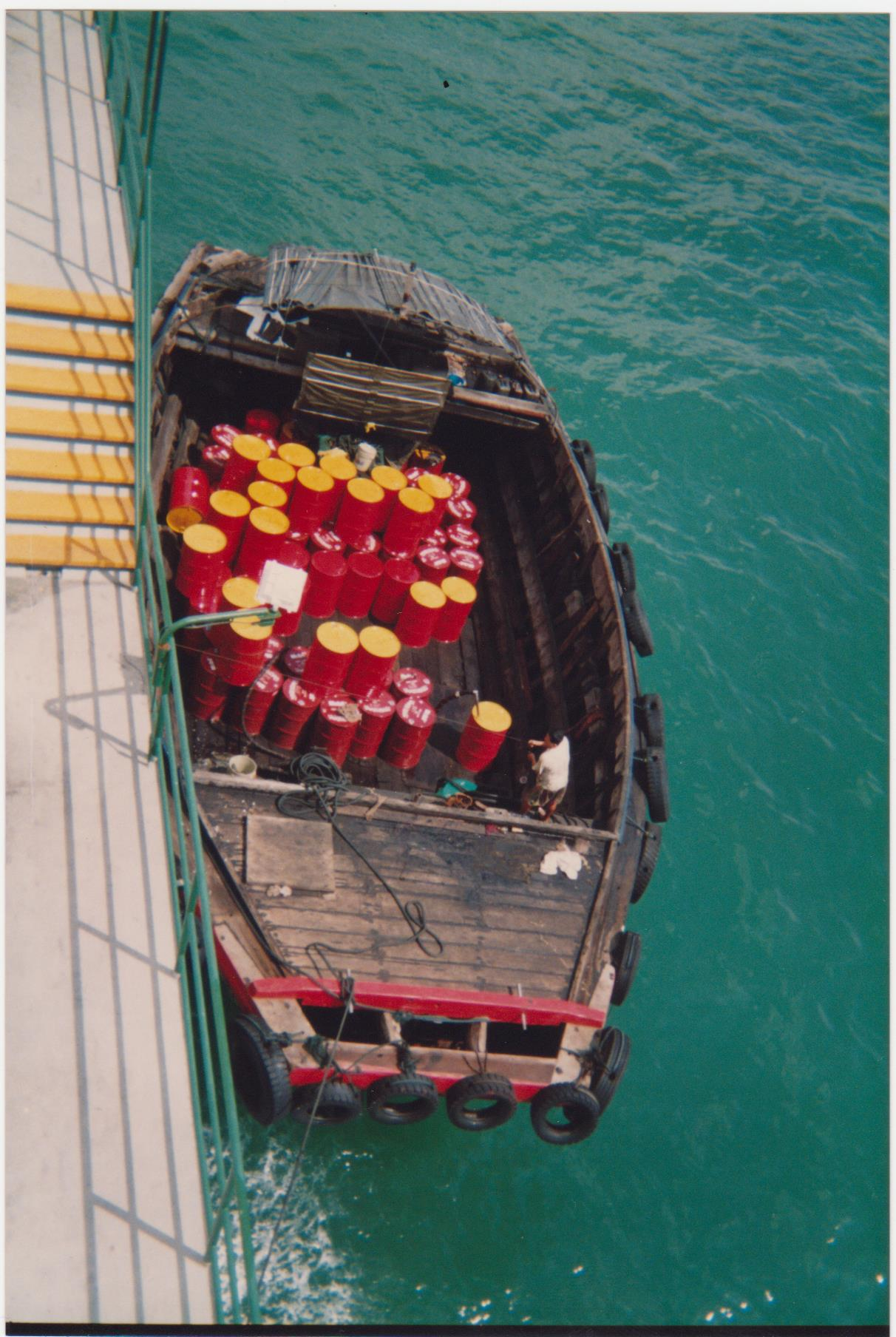
Twakow loading lubricant oil in Singapore

Tongkangs were actively used in Singapore. For example, an area around Read Bridge was known as "Cha Chun Tau" (Chinese: 柴船頭; Pe̍h-ōe-jī: Chhâ-chûn-thâu; lit. 'jetty for boats carrying firewood'), in reference to small tongkangs carrying firewood from the Indonesian archipelago that berthed there. The firewood trade was primarily a Teochew enterprise.

A tongkang in full sail appeared on the reverse of the 1990 and 1992 Singapore dollar 2 $ currency notes. Tongkang LRT station was named after this boat.

Another boat used on the Singapore River along with the tongkang was the twakow. These traditional vessels began to disappear around the 1930s, following the introduction of motor-powered boats and contemporary-type lighters.

== See also ==
- Junk Rig
- Tongkang Pechah
- Sampan panjang
- Jong
