= Toop (boat) =

Type of boat-ship produced in the East Indies

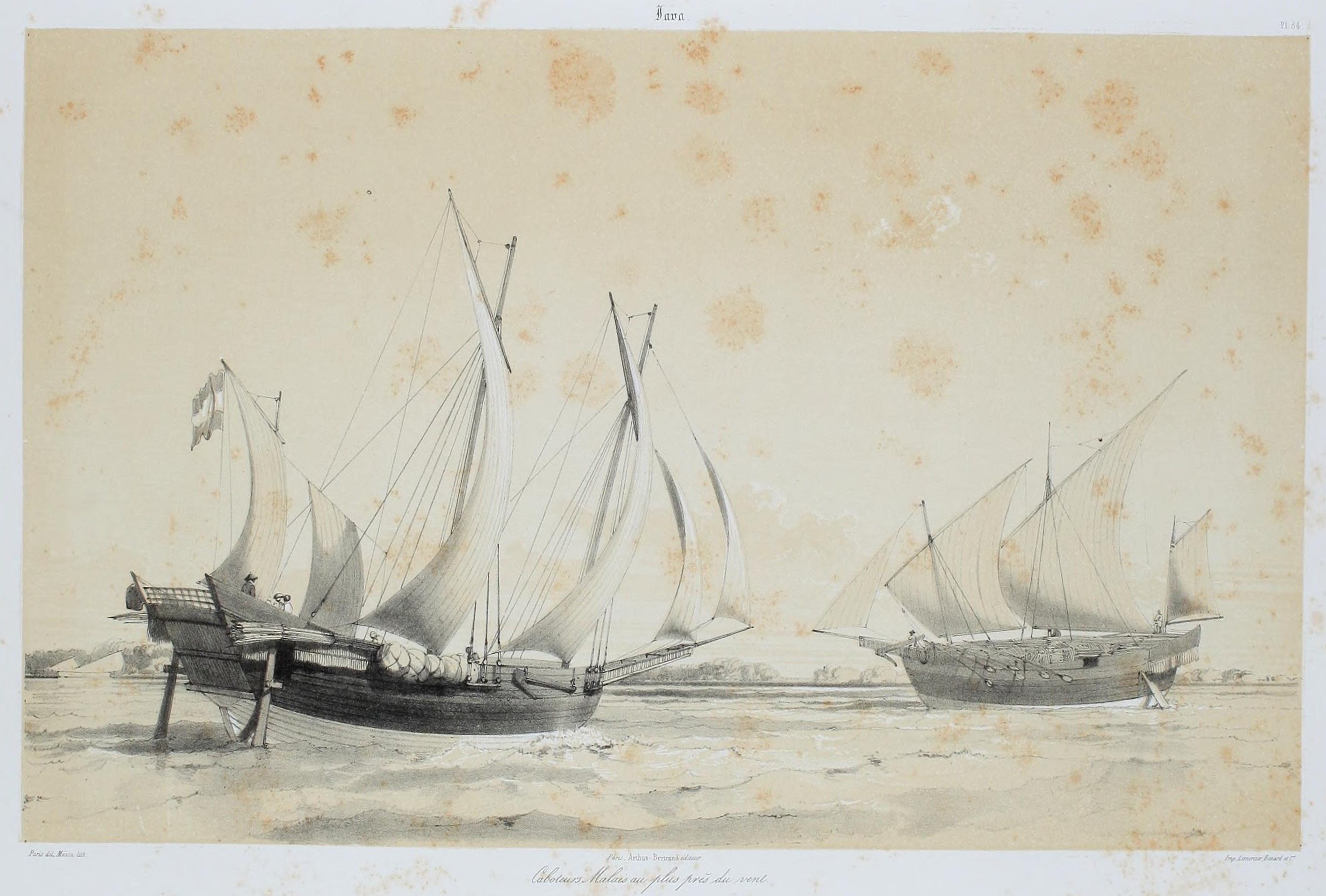
Two Malay coaster in Java, with toop sail and rigging.

Toop (also known as toup, prauw toop or perahu toop) is a type of boat-ship produced in East Indies. Appeared at the end of the 18th century, and built in local shipyards, this type of boat is one of the results of the incorporation of 'Western' and 'Nusantaran' technologies that began in the shipyards of the 17th and 18th European trading companies. This type of boat is commonly used for long-distance shipping. In the first half of the 19th century, this was the most common type of boat used by sailors and traders in Nusantara. The majority of toops are owned by merchants from the western area of Nusantara.

== Description ==
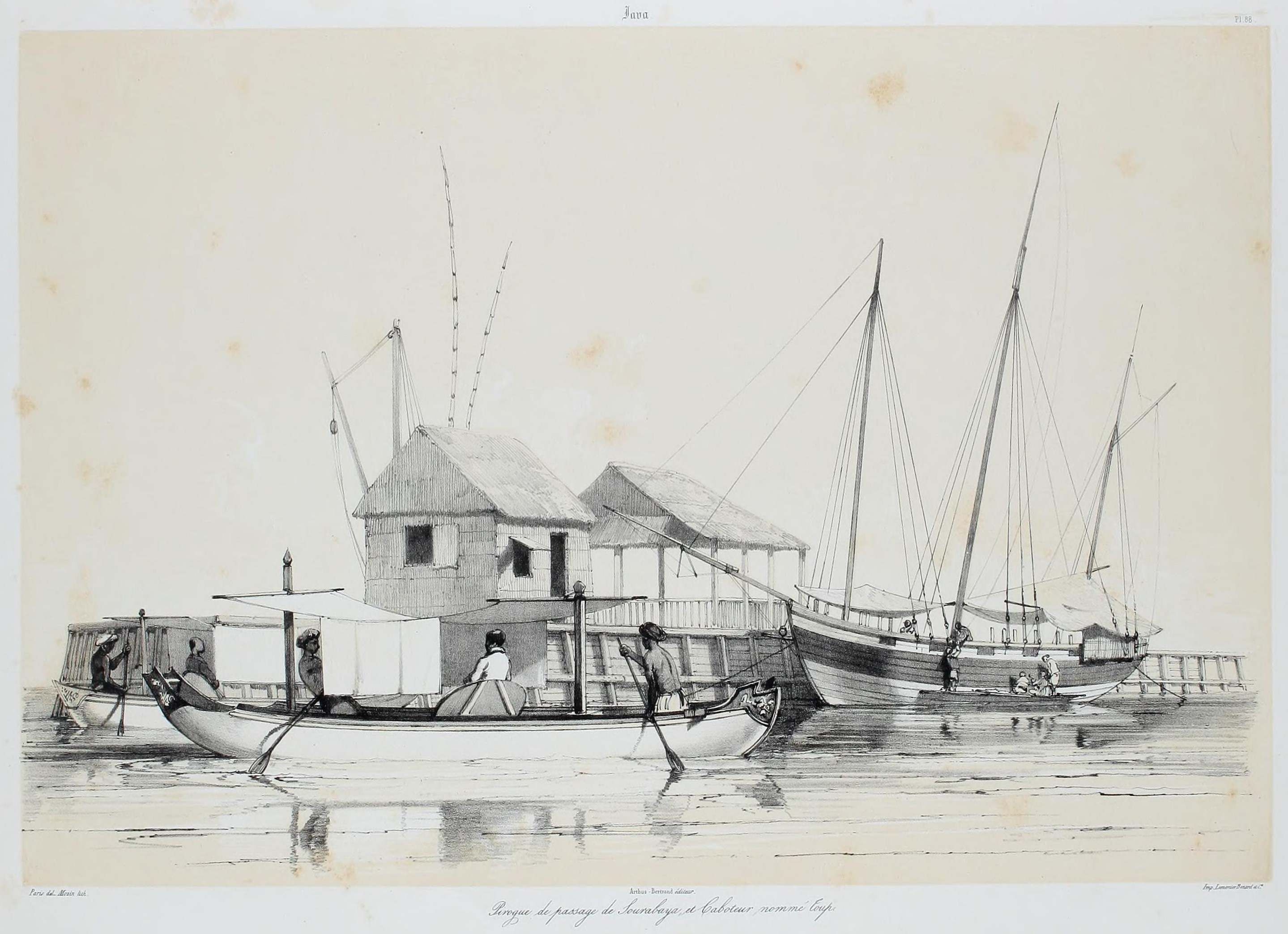
A western hulled toop, at the right side of the image.

Two to three masted, toop carries 2 similar trapezoid sail on the main mast and the fore mast; the sails are arranged in such a way that a toop can turn the bow towards the wind without lowering and moving the sail under the new wind, something very beneficial if beating to windward in a narrow place. The stern is equipped with European-style fore-and-aft sail, and there may be three or four small headsails attached to the bowsprit. The masts are not bipod or tripod, but only a single masts that was reinforced with shrouds similar to European masts attachments.

Toop in general used for long-distance shipping and shows the much similarities with European design: The stern of many toop is quadrilateral (transom), and the shape of the hull is more similar to European sailing vessels than Nusantaran boats. Most of these boats are made using the same technique with those used to build European ships: Attaching the framework to keel first before the attaching the outer planking. The boat sometimes also carried oars, numbered between 16 and 20. Some of them also towed a sloop behind that could carry the entire crew. The presence of large sloop indicates that the toop is prepared to operate in areas without dock facilities that can facilitate loading and unloading activities.

The hull of toop is decked at fore and aft. The square stern has ornamental carvings. At the aft there is a cabin which rises slightly above deck and covered with a roof inclined longitudinally. South Sulawesian toop had this cabin entirely below deck. In light loads, the upperworks at sides were raised with mats. A cargo hatch is present abaft each mast. South Sulawesian prau toop only has 2 masts, the ones from Surabaya has taller masts.

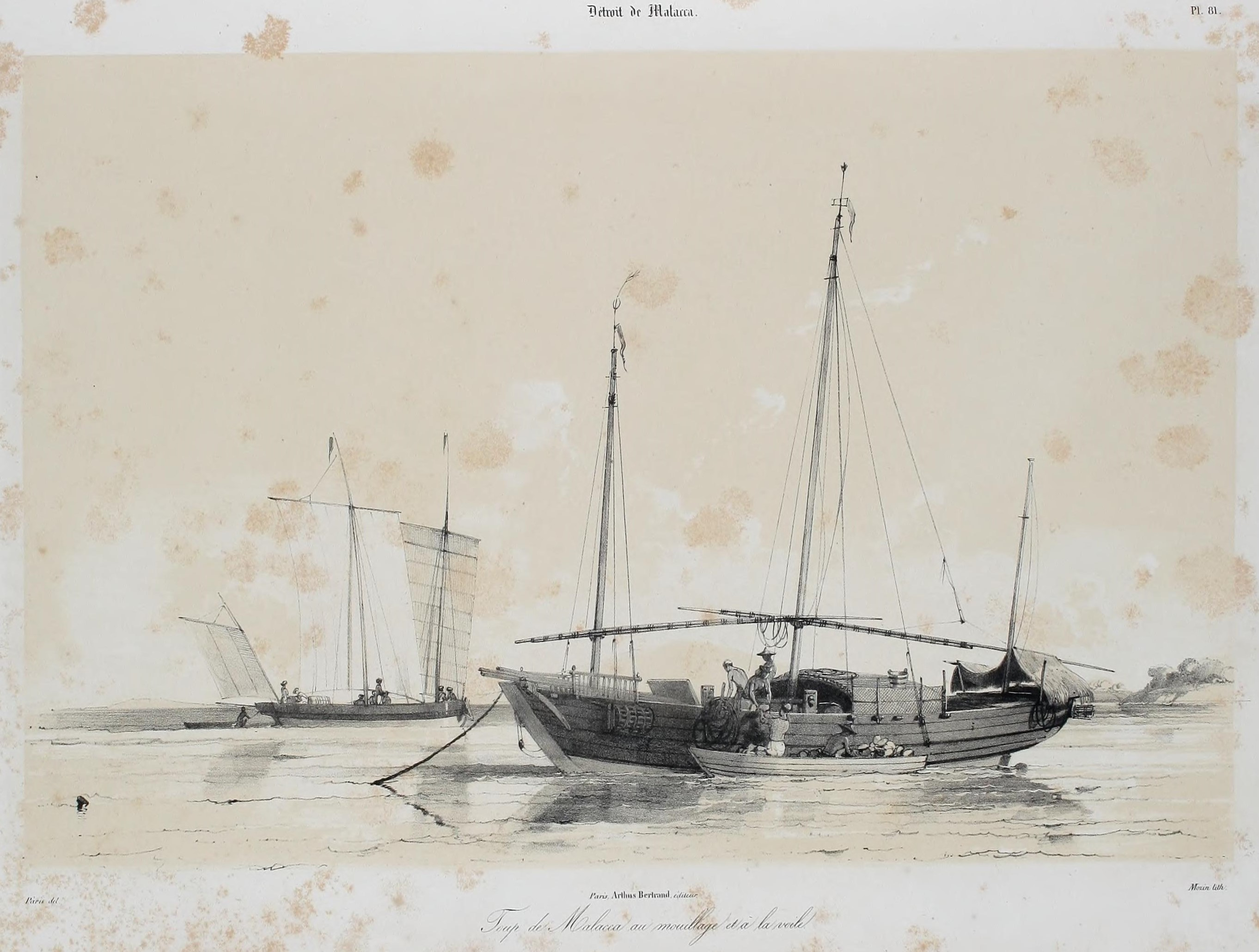
Toop in the Malacca strait.

However, different illustrations and descriptions showed variations of toop's hull: There are European-type hulls, with rectangular sterns and middle (axial) steering; there are boats with bow similar to European ships, but using side steering (double quarter rudder) and stern decks similar to padewakang. The difference of hull forms suggests that the word 'toop' actually refer to the sail plan, a combination of fore-and-aft 'Western' sails and two elevated rectangular sails that seems to be a variety of tanja sails.

The carrying capacity of toop is about 40–60 koyan (96.8–145 metric tons), the largest being 100 koyan (241,9 metric tons). There are toop which is favored by Bugis, the shape is look like a padewakang, but uses two to three masts whose rigging is European-styled, and carrying a kind of spritsail. These boats are generally larger than padewakang, and only used for trading. Western hulled toop is favored by the Dutch to be armed in case of war.

U.S. office of strategic service noted the dimensions of toop: A length of 49–59 ft (14.94–17.98 m), breadth of 10–13 ft (3.05–3.96 m), and depth of 10–11.5 ft (3.05–3.51 m).

== See also ==
- Padewakang
- Pencalang
- Mayang
- Chialoup
- Jong
- Bedar
