= Sampan panjang =

Malay fast boat from 19th century

A three-masted sampan panjang from about 1880, from a model in the Raffles Museum collection.

Sampan panjang was a type of Malay fast boat from the 19th century. It was used especially by the sampan-men, or "Orang Laut" (lit. "sea people"). Historically, they can be found in Malaysia, Singapore, and Indonesia. This type of boat was used by Malay people as racing boat and as transport boat. The sampan panjang appeared at the first quarter of the 19th century, and disappeared at the turn of that century. These boats proved to be superior to European boats in racing purposes; they were easy winners when racing against the European yachts of that time.

== Etymology ==
The name sampan panjang comes from the Malay words sampan, meaning boat, and panjang, meaning long; thus, the name means "long boat". The term sampan might be derived from Chinese sam-pan or san-pan, or conversely the Chinese term might be derived from Malay or another Austronesian language. It is also called perahu panjang, since the words sampan and perahu in Malay language are synonymous.

== History ==
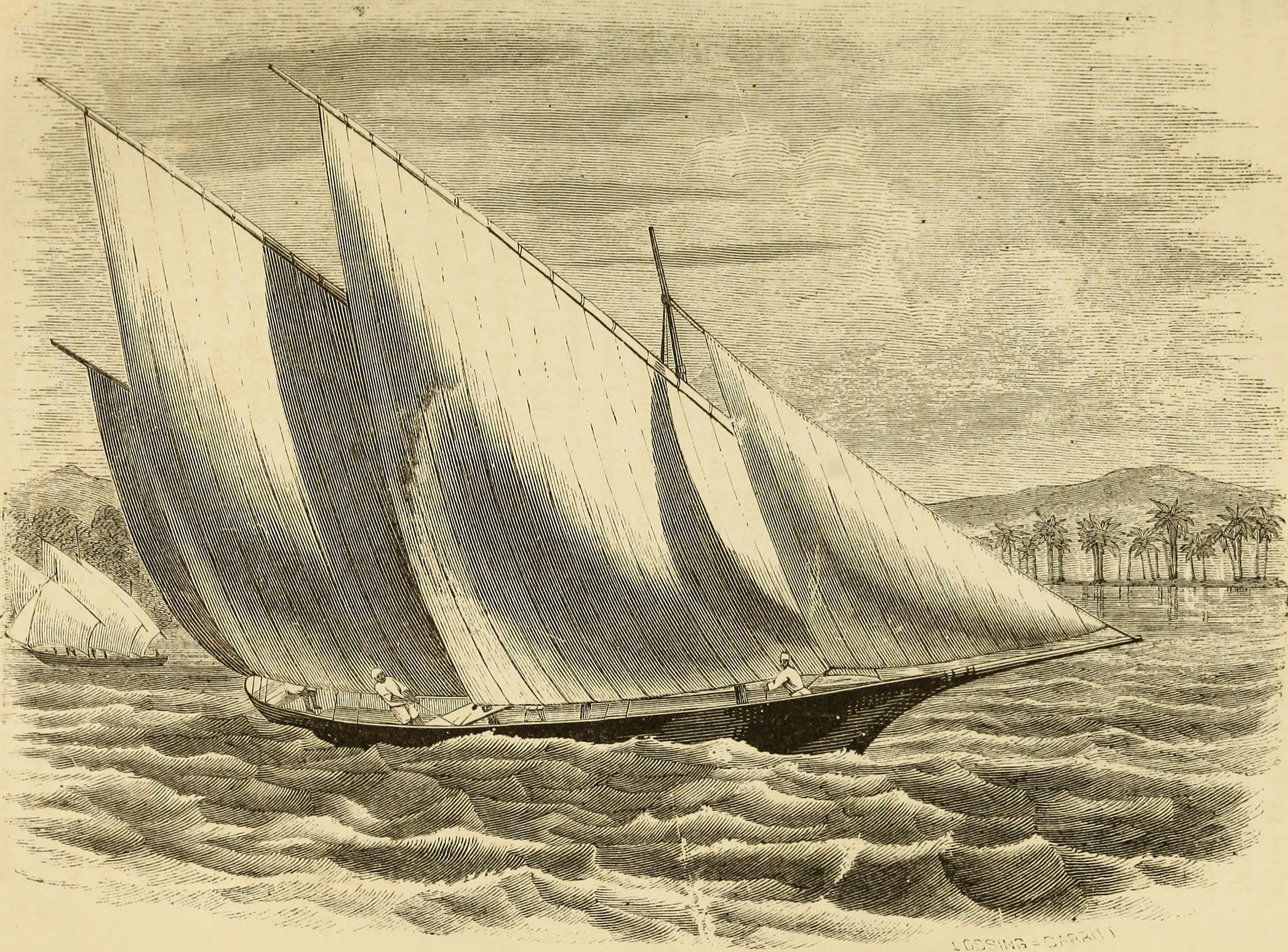
A Malay perahu near Singapore.

The first record of sampan panjangs comes from Singapore Chronicle for Thursday, 15 May 1834. It describes a rowing match between 4 Malay sampans and boats from three vessels lying in the roads, which as usual was won easily by the Malays.

A book by G. W. Earl from 1837 provides an early description of the sampan panjang. At that time the boat was 30 ft (9 m) long and 4 ft (1.2 m) wide. It had two masts with large lateens, loose-footed dipping lugsails. It was steered using a long, diamond-shaped paddle, which could also be used to increase speed. It carried five crewmen.

Some years later the Sultan of Lingga acquired a fine sailing sampan panjang, ordered from Trengganu, which had a long and most successful racing career. In 1839 he challenged the fastest of the European yachts in the settlement to a race for $500 a side. The challenge was accepted by the owner of the Maggie Lauder, a well-known boat in her day. They followed the New Years Day regatta course, which then covered about 14 miles, and the Malay boat came in with the Maggie still seven miles from the finishing line.

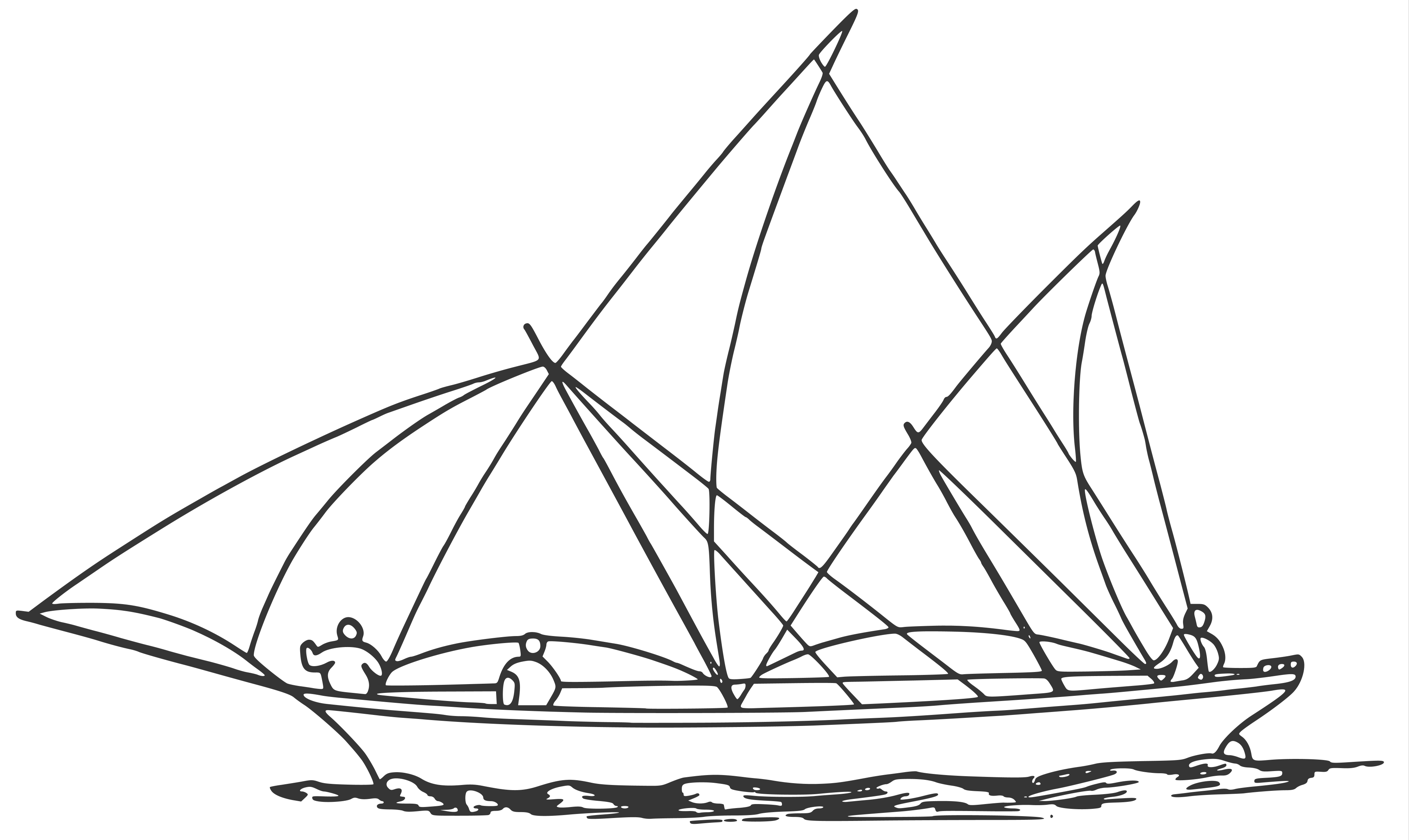
A passenger sampan panjang from about 1860: Drawn from a boat shown in Gray's engraving of the Singapore waterfront, which dated from 1861.

Dr. Berncastle in 1850 describes the sampan panjang as very light boats and was elegant in shape. He notes that the sampans were propelled by paddles or lateen sails made of mats. The latter also appear in Gray's engraving of the Singapore water front, and would seem to have been in fairly general use from this period onwards, if not earlier.

Development of the sampan panjang continued during the third quarter of the century. The lines became finer, the hull rather longer, and a bowsprit was added to set a headsail: a light rudder was also introduced in this period, and occasionally passenger boats were built with "counter" type stern or narrow transom.

The sampan panjang started to decline after the first wharf of Tanjong Pagar came into operation in 1866. The opening of the Suez canal made many steamers flood the area of the sampan panjang, which resulted in the decrease of their number.

Mitman (1923: p. 258) writes rather condescendingly of the maker of sampan panjang:

These boats are perhaps among the most remarkable examples of the wave-line form in the world; their midship section closely resembles that of modern yachts. It is little less than marvelous that the semicivilized builders of these craft should have arrived so near perfection in designing by "rule-of-thumb" methods.

— Mitman, Catalogue of the watercraft collection in the U.S. National Museum

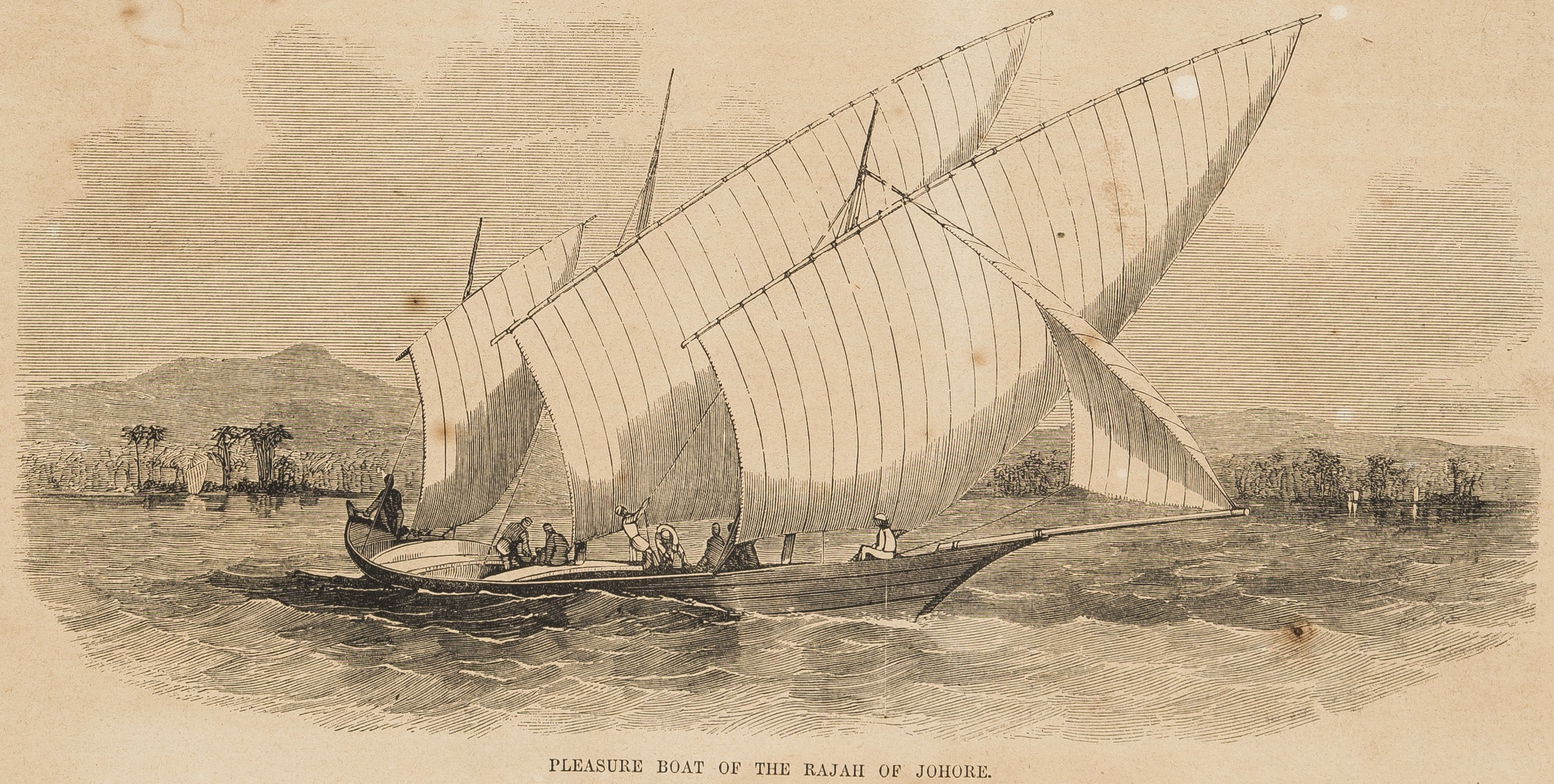
The pleasure boat of the rajah of Johore, 1851.

By the last quarter of the century it was being made with hull lengths of 40 ft. (12.2 m) and over, and some example had 3 masts. Such boats were expensive to build and maintain. They required crews, with some experience, of 20–25 men for racing purposes, but the hull and yards were beyond the means of a Malay kampong which alone could have produced the men on an amateur basis. They were, in fact, suitable only for local magnates, and then all that could be done with one was to race against another sampan panjang. The size of the crew required to man them, the ease with which they shipped water and the lack of finish inside the hull, made them useless for cruising purposes.

By the middle 1880s there were probably less than ten serviceable racing hulls afloat. In 1885 only two were entered for their class in the annual New Years Day regatta compared to 37 of the previous twenty year. According to Buckley, by 1902, only four were still in commission in Johnston's pier, and even these did not last until the beginning of the first world war. By this time the racing sampan itself had also been outmoded, and its place taken by the lighter kolek Johore, which as the Johore racing kolek remains the most prominent feature of all local regattas.

== See also ==
- Sandeq, fishing and racing boat from Indonesia
- Toop, merchant boat used widely in the 19th century Malay archipelago
- Lepa
- Palari
- Tongkang
- Sampan
