= Hup Seng =

Malaysian biscuit manufacturer

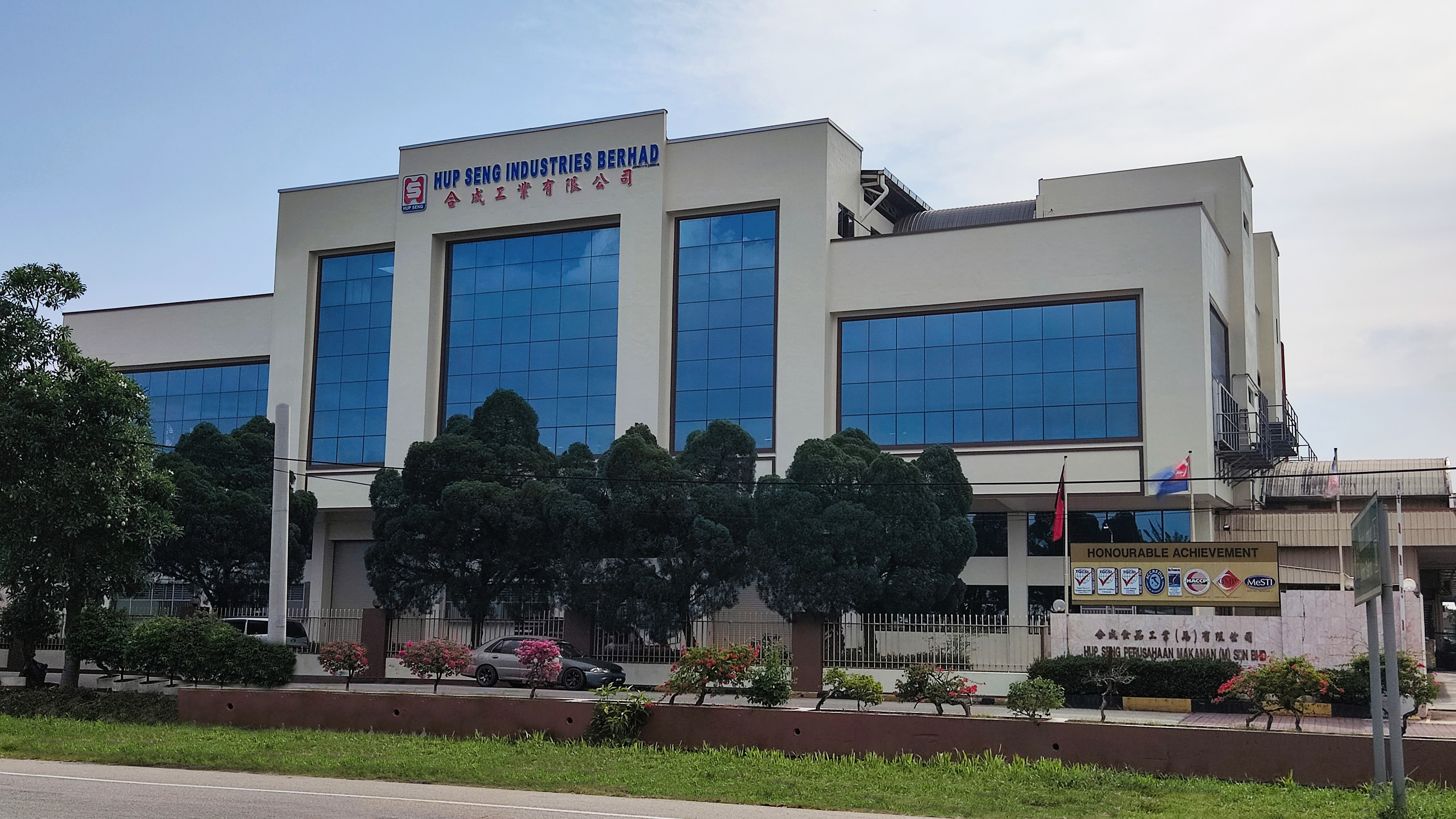
- Company type: Public limited company
- Industry: Food processing, snack
- Founded: 1950
- Founder: Kerk family
- Headquarters: Malaysia
- Products: Biscuits, cookies

Hup Seng (Chinese: 合成) is a Malaysian manufacturer of biscuits.

In 1957, four brothers of the Kerk family, and another partner, founded Hup Seng in the Malay village of Parit Linau Kecil, Bukit Pasir in Batu Pahat, Johor, with a capital of RM1,500 to sell confectioneries including biscuits.

The company officially became Hup Seng Perusahaan Makanan (M) Sdn Bhd (HPSM) in 1974. HPSM is now part of Hup Seng Industries Bhd, which was listed on Bursa Malaysia in 2000.
