= Tongkang Pechah =

- Town in Malaysia

Other transcription(s)
  - Jawi: توڠكڠ ڤچه
  - Chinese: 中江
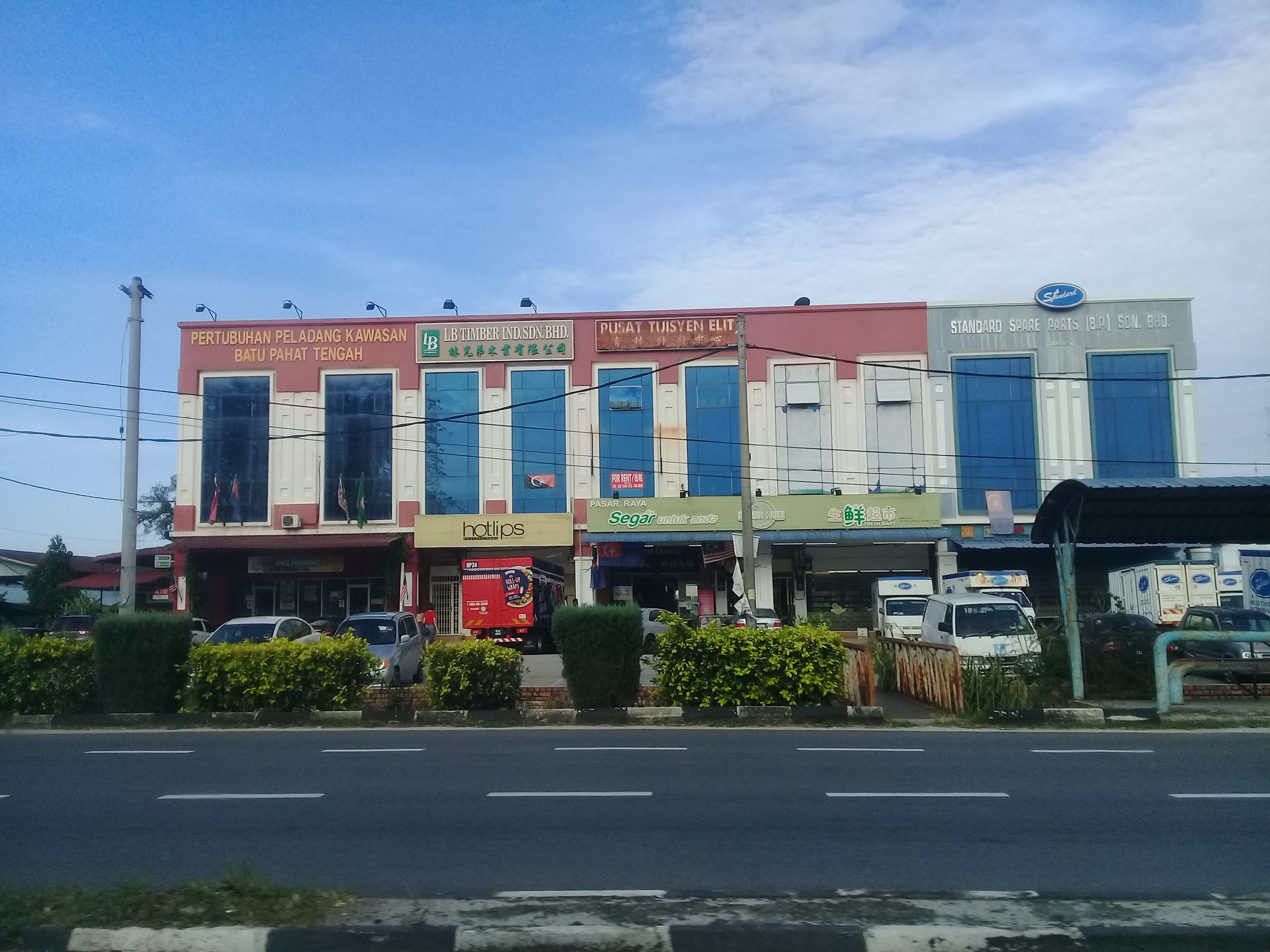
- Tongkang Pechah, Batu Pahat, Johor, Malaysia

- Tongkang Pechah in Johor, Malay Peninsular and Malaysia Tongkang Pechah (Peninsular Malaysia) Tongkang Pechah (Malaysia)
- Coordinates: 1°55′N 102°57′E
- Country: Malaysia
- State: Johor
- District: Batu Pahat

Area
  - Total: 6.6 km^{2} (2.5 sq mi)
- Time zone: UTC+8 (MYT)
- Postal code: 83010

Tongkang Pechah (Jawi: توڠكڠ ڤچه, Chinese: 中江) is a small town in Batu Pahat District, Johor, Malaysia. Its name was taken from the bauxite ore tongkang which sunk in Sungai Simpang Kiri (nearby the bridge which connected Batu Pahat and Tongkang Pechah).

== Geography ==
The town spans over an area of 6.6 km^{2}.

== Economy ==
This small town is occupied with manufacturing factories in the 1990s, including fabric factories and biscuit factories. Well-known biscuit factories (Hup Seng, Munchy's and Hwa Tai) are located in this small town.

== Neighbourhood ==
- Bandar Putera Indah
