= Sampan =

Form of boat from Southeast Asia

- Chinese: 舢舨
Transcriptions
Standard Mandarin
- Hanyu Pinyin: Shānbǎn
Yue: Cantonese
- Yale Romanization: Sāan báan
- Jyutping: Saan1 baan2
Southern Min
- Hokkien POJ: Sam-pán

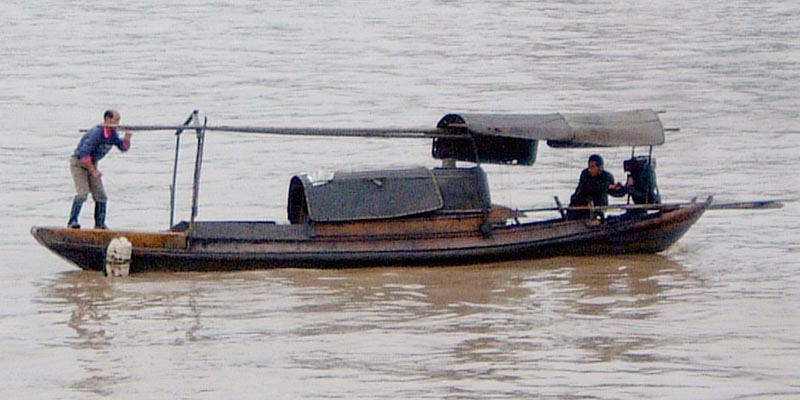
Sampan on the Yangtze River (Chang Jiang), China

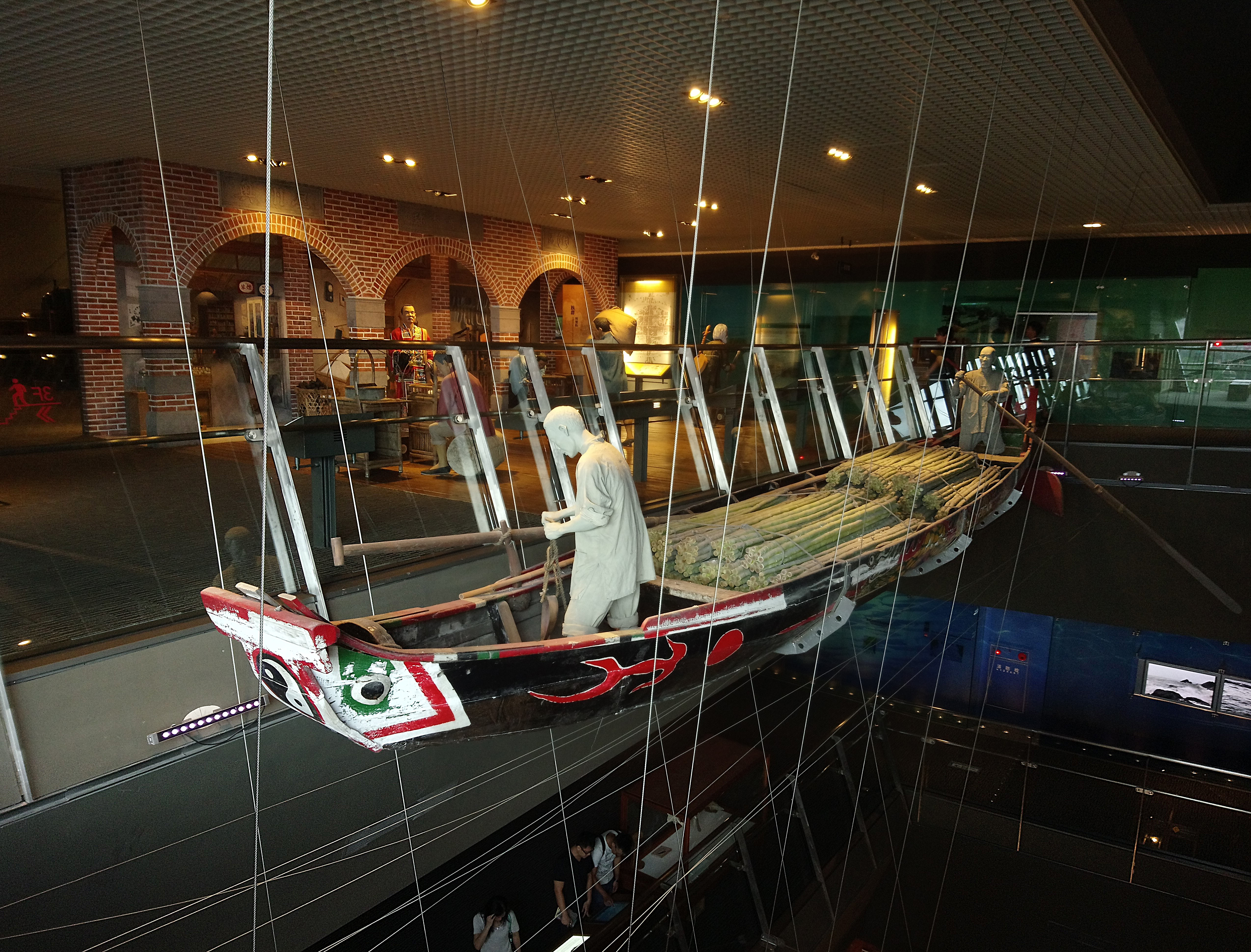
Model of sampan in Lanyang Museum

A sampan is a relatively flat-bottomed wooden boat found in East, Southeast, and South Asia. It is possibly of Chinese or Austronesian origin. Some sampans include a small shelter on board and may be used as a permanent habitation on inland waters. The design closely resembles Western hard chine boats like the scow or punt. Sampans are generally used for transportation in coastal areas or rivers and are often used as traditional fishing boats. It is unusual for a sampan to sail far from land, as they do not have the means to survive rough weather.

It is sometimes claimed that the word "sampan" is derived from the Cantonese term sāam báan (三板), literally "three planks", but this is likely to be a false etymology. A possible Austronesian origin of the word has been suggested, as it is attested in an Old Malay inscription from 684 CE.

Sampans may be propelled by poles, oars (particularly a single, long stern sculling oar called a yuloh (simplified Chinese 摇橹/ traditional Chinese 搖櫓)) or may be fitted with outboard motors.

Sampans are still in use by rural residents of Southeast Asia, particularly in Malaysia, Indonesia, Bangladesh, Myanmar, Sri Lanka and Vietnam.

Malay communities in Southeast Asia also use the term sampan for their boats. Large boats such as sampan panjang, kolek and perahu panjang are used and built by the Malays and Orang Laut living in their coastal villages.

== Image gallery ==
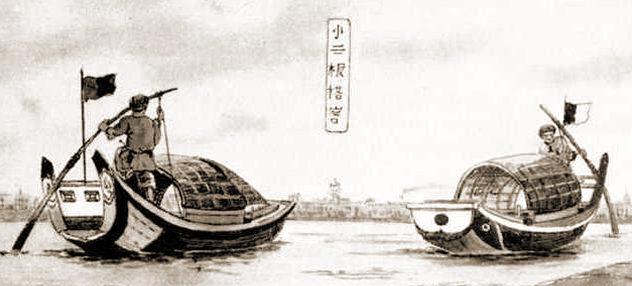
Traditional hongtou (red-head) sampans of Shanghai, China

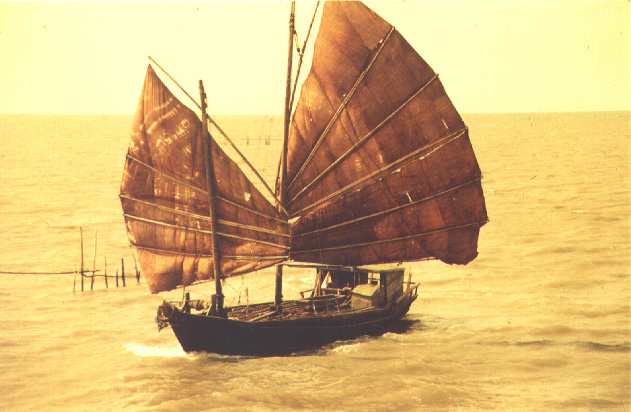
A contemporary sampan comes back from fishing, on the north coast of Java

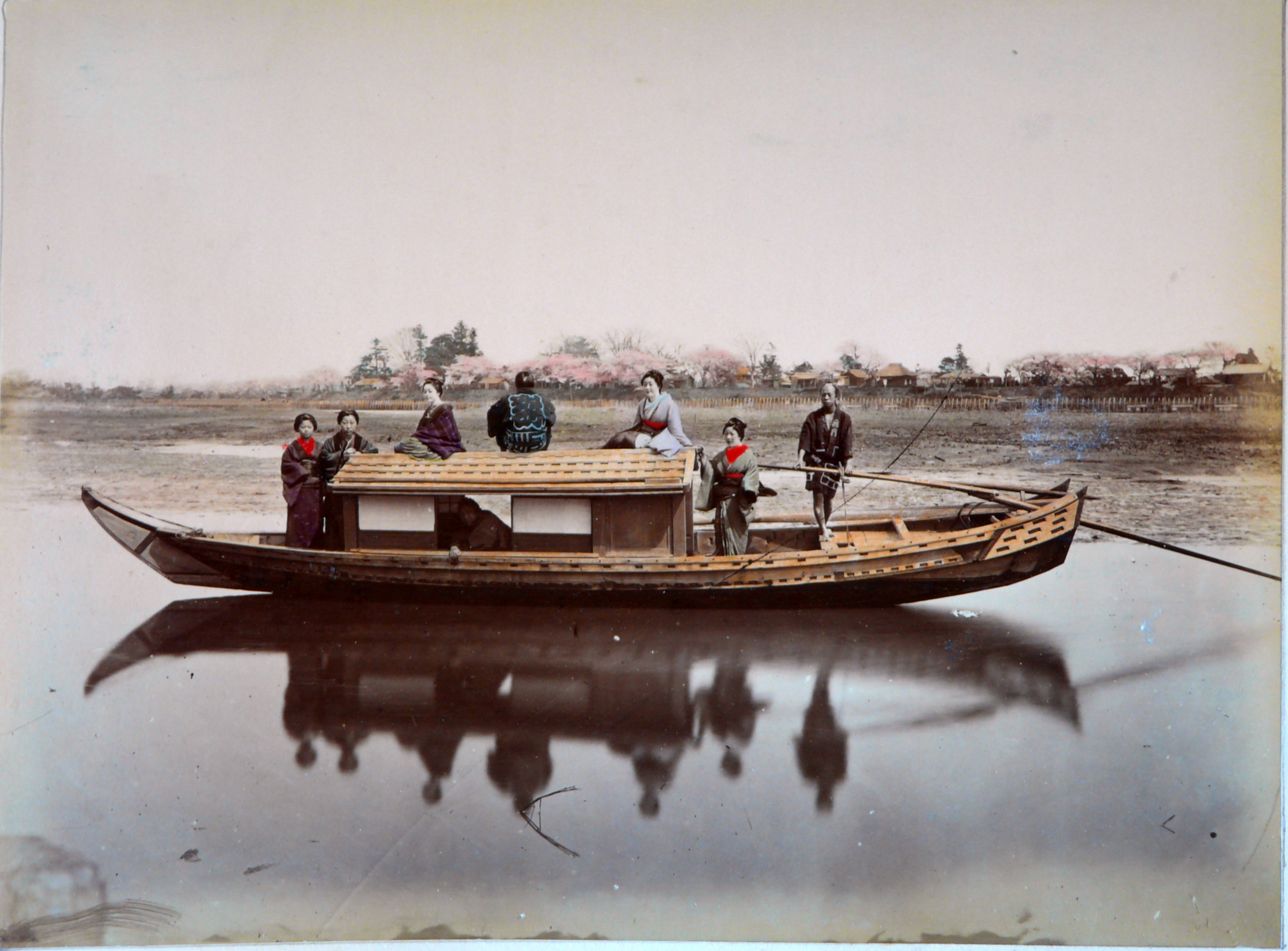
Japanese sampan-like river boat. Dating from before 1886

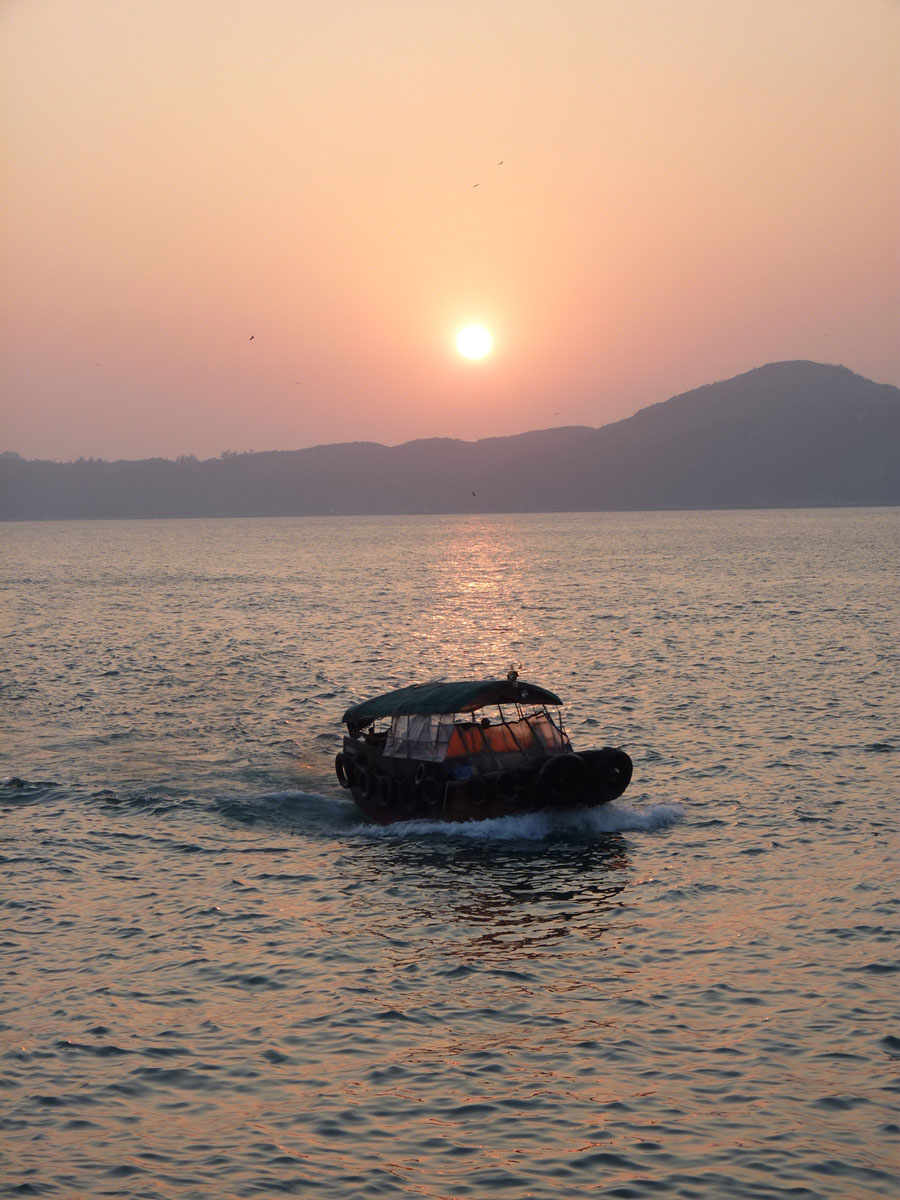
Small sampan still being used for passenger transportation between islands in Hong Kong

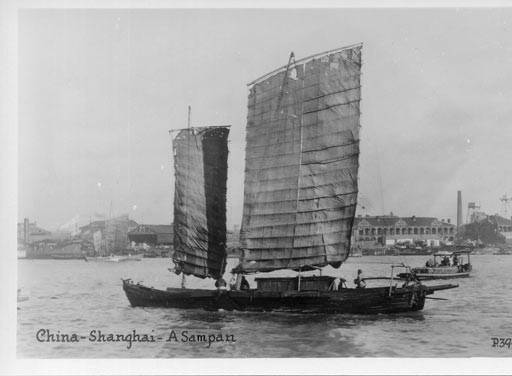
A Sampan in Shanghai, China

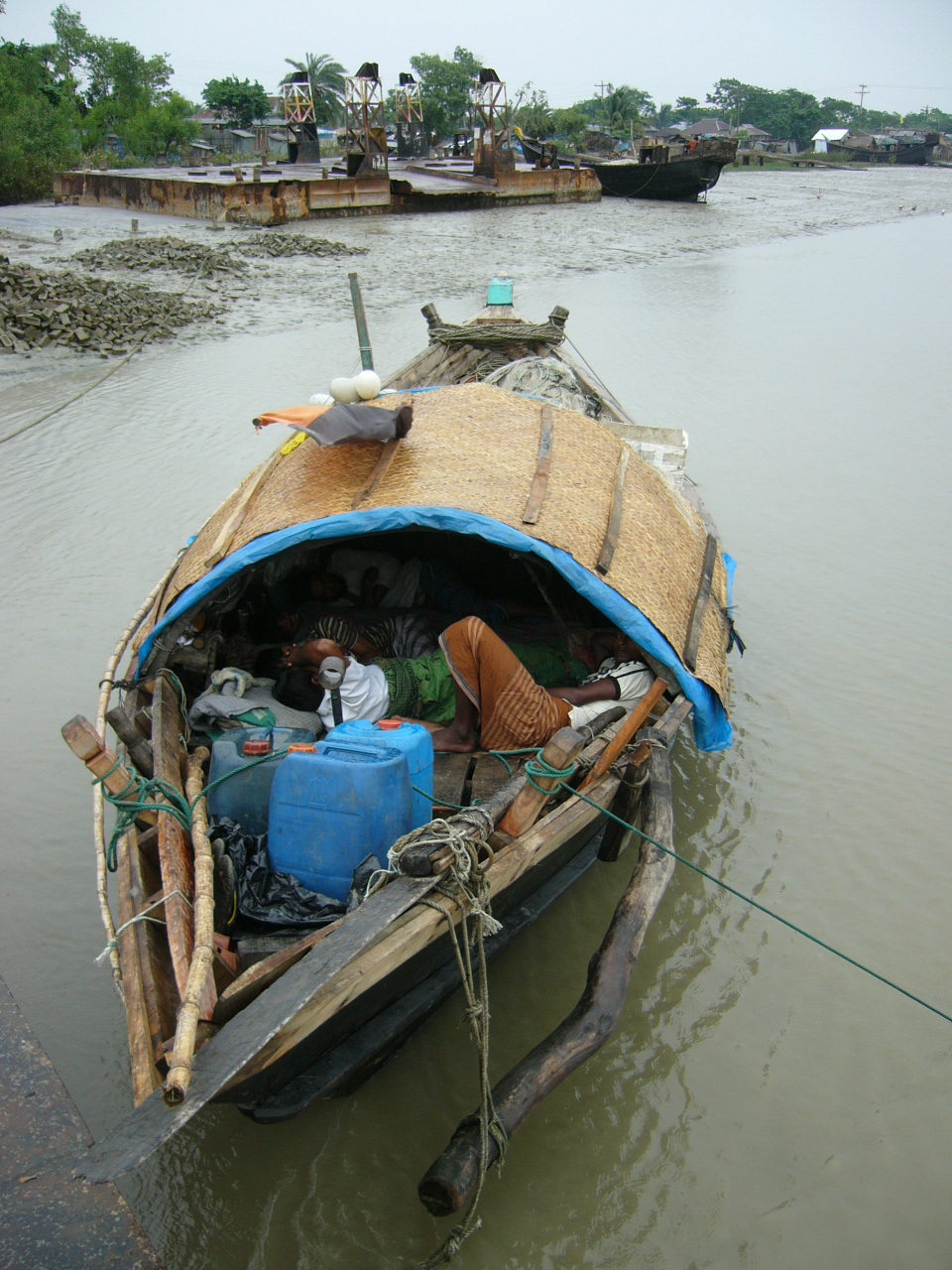
Bangladeshi fishermen resting in the shade of a sampan in Barishal

== See also ==
- Casco (barge), Filipino version of Sampan
- Sampan panjang, Malay boat
