= Bangka anak-anak =

Very small dugout canoe from the Philippines

Bangka anak-anak are very small dugout canoes among the Sama-Bajau people of the Philippines. They are typically made by Sama-Bajau fathers for their children and are patterned after the larger Sama-Bajau dugout canoes (the buggoh, birau, and junkun). They can be used for transportation between the Sama-Bajau houseboats, but are more commonly used for playing. They are typically no longer than around 1.5 m (4.9 ft) long. Children as young as three or four can use these boats, which allows them to learn valuable maritime skills.

== See also ==
- Junkun
- Owong
- Vinta
- Djenging
- Garay (ship)
- Balangay
