= Tiririt =

Type of dinghy in the Philippines

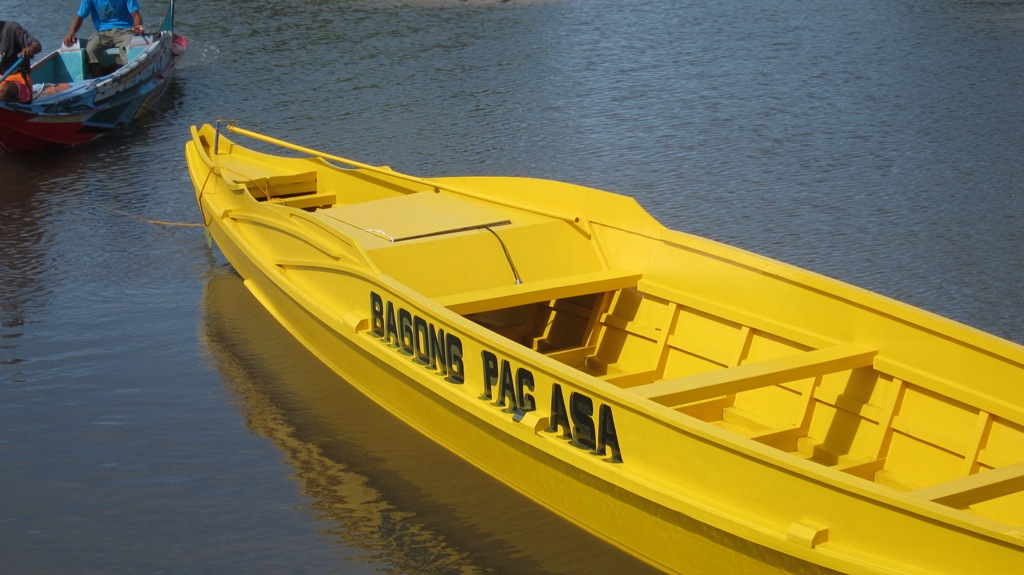
Two tiririt from Zamboanga City

Tiririt, also known as taririt or papet, is a type of small dinghy of the Sama-Bajau and Tausug people of the Philippines. It is commonly motorized. It is usually carried aboard larger motherships and assists in transporting passenger and cargo to the shore, as well as in towing the boat to port. However, it can also be used as a small inter-island transport. It is roughly leaf-shaped in outline with a distinctive hump-backed side-profile. The prow and stern can sometimes rise up into arcs. It normally has no outriggers.

Larger independent versions of the tiririt reaching up to around 7 m (23 ft) long, are known as buti or buti-buti. They have upturned prows and sterns and can carry around a dozen people. Buti-buti are the subject of a Sama-Bajau folk dance also known as "buti-buti", which depicts everyday activities of fishing villages accompanied by a song (leleng).

== See also ==
- Buggoh
- Birau (boat)
- Owong
- Junkun
- Vinta
- Djenging
- Garay (ship)
- Balangay
