= Ontang =

Type of raft of the Sama-Bajau people of the Philippines

Ontang is a type of raft of the Sama-Bajau people of the Philippines. They resemble a miniature catamaran, with two bamboo floats about 1 m (3.3 ft) long connected by two bow-shaped booms. A platform made split bamboo is built on top of the booms. Ontang can be used for fishing, but they can also hold lanterns during night-time fishing. They are typically towed behind Sama-Bajau houseboats during travel, with the towing line commonly strung with baited fish hooks.

== See also ==
- Junkun
- Owong
- Vinta
- Djenging
- Garay (ship)
- Balangay
