= Lepa (ship) =

Boats of the Southeast Asian Sama-Bajau people

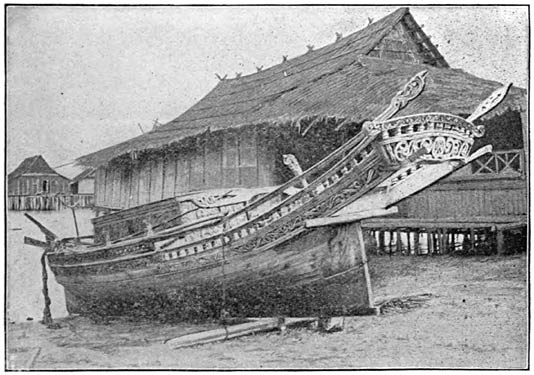
A Sama lepa houseboat from the Philippines with an elaborately carved stern (c. 1905)

Lepa, also known as lipa or lepa-lepa, are indigenous ships of the Sama-Bajau people in the Philippines, Malaysia, and Indonesia. They were traditionally used as houseboats by the seagoing Sama Dilaut. Since most Sama have abandoned exclusive sea-living, modern lepa are instead used as fishing boats and cargo vessels.

Lepa are medium-sized boats, usually averaging at 30 to 50 ft (9.1 to 15.2 m) in length, and around 5 to 7 ft (1.5 to 2.1 m) in width; with the hull averaging at 5 ft (1.5 m) in height. Lepa is also known as pidlas, among land-dwelling Sama. Very large lepa are known as sapit or kumpit. They can reach lengths of 50 to 120 ft (15 to 37 m) and are most often used as trade ships and also for deep sea fishing. Family lepa usually tow smaller daughter ships, like the buggoh or the birau. Lepa can also be used as a generic term for "boat" in the various Sama-Bajau groups; the vinta, for example, is also known as lepa-lepa. Lepa nowadays are increasingly being replaced by motor-powered outrigger canoes, the pambot ("pump boat").

== Etymology ==
The name "Lepa" originated from the word of Sama-Bajau that lived in Timbun Mata Island, Semporna which is Paleh Tinampah (the name of second generations of lepa created after bogo-basal). The name later on was shortened to lepa which became the standard name for all the houseboats created in the coastal area of Semporna before it spreads to the area around Sulu Archipelago.

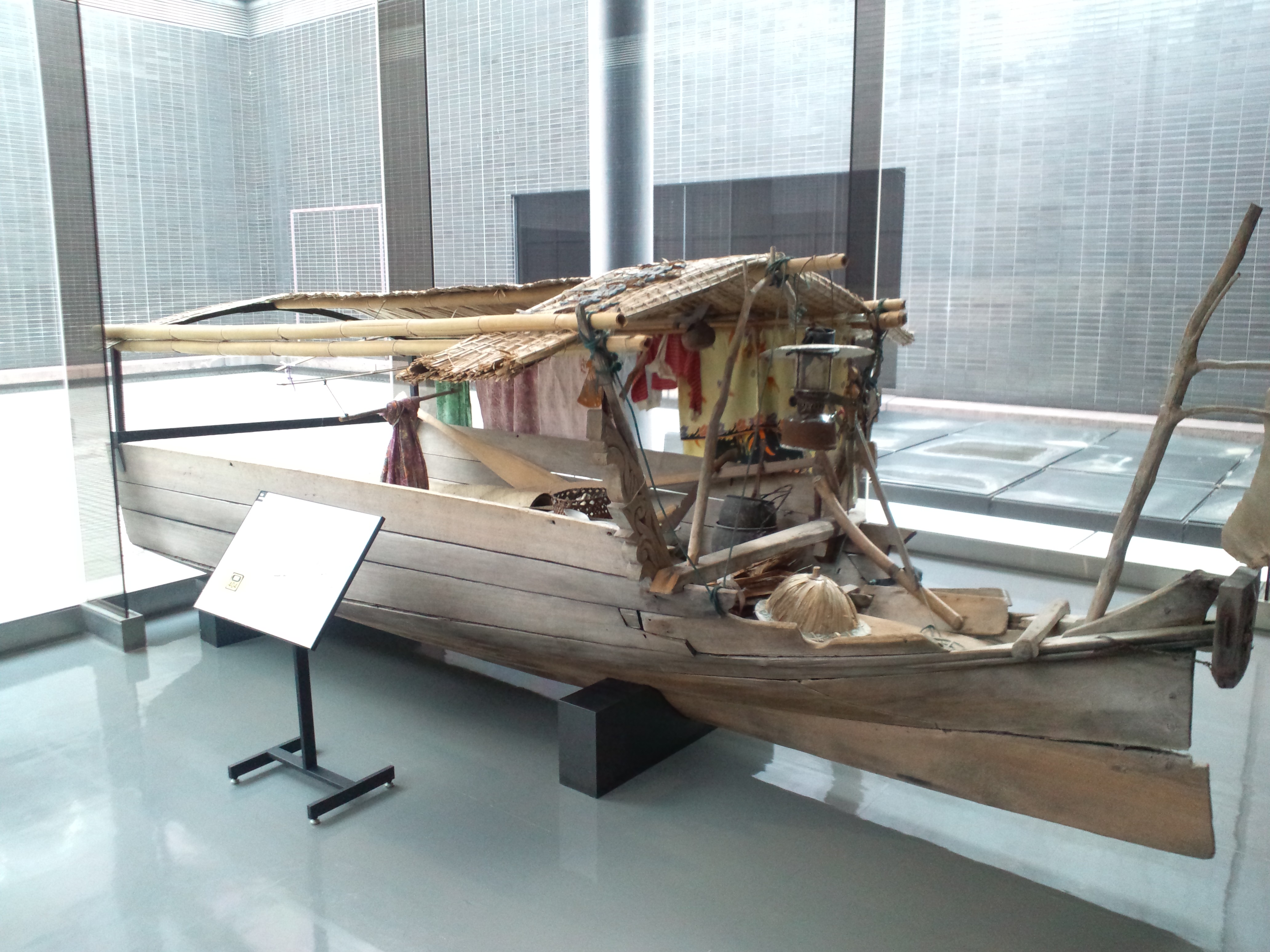
Front half of a lepa from the National Museum of Ethnology, Osaka, Japan

== Description ==
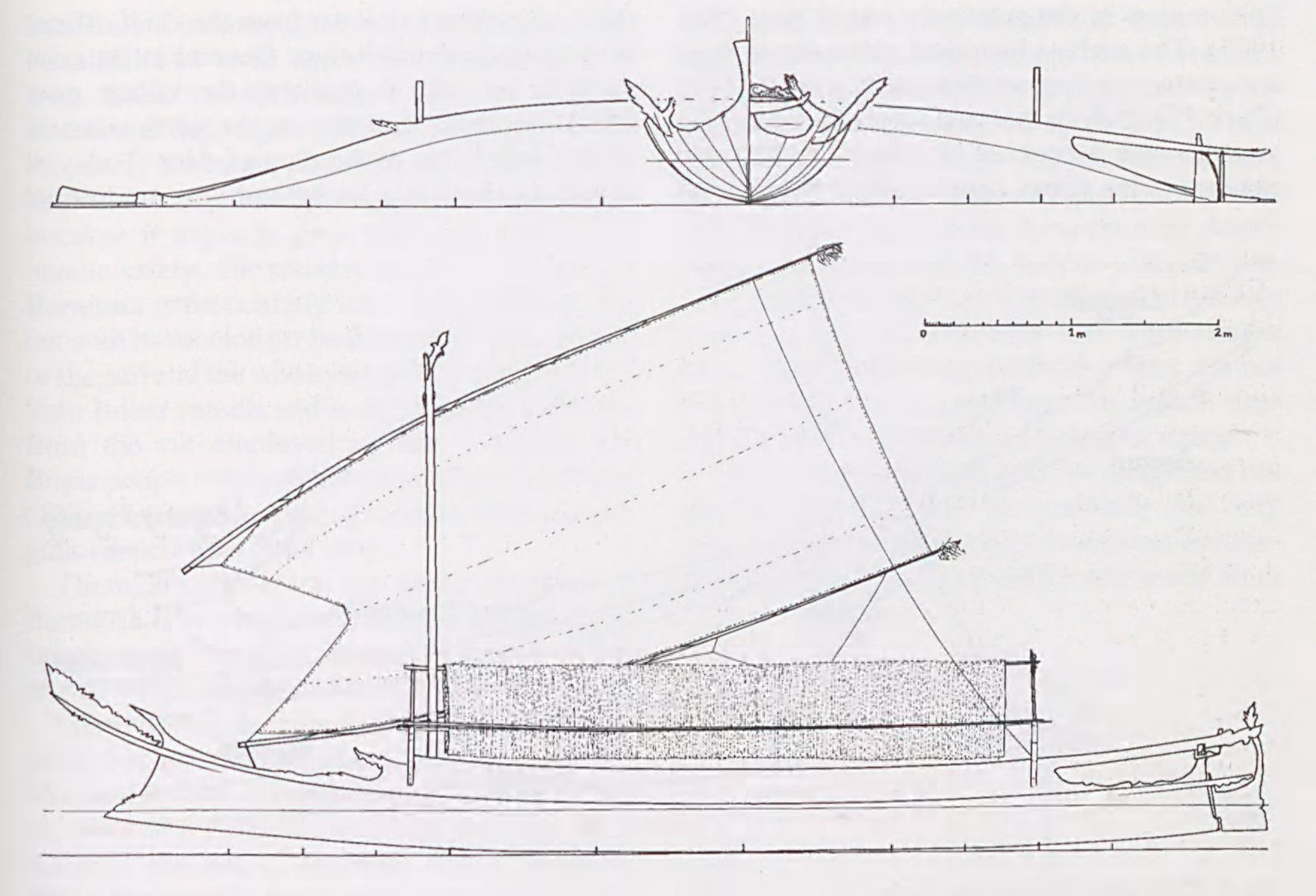
Sketch of a lipa-lipa (lepa-lepa) of Bajau people.

The keel of lepa is made from a shallow dugout known as the tadas or lunas. It is built up along the sides with strakes that are narrower than the keel. An additional three sideboards are joined edge-to-edge to the topmost strake (the gunwales), extending from the stern. They are known as (bottom to top) bengkol, kapi kapi, and koyang koyang. They do not extend fully towards the prow, forming a distinctive gap at the front hull of the ship. The hull tapers sharply at the prow and stern. Like in other indigenous Philippine ships, the hull of the lepa is traditionally fitted together by dowels (tambuko) and fiber lashings instead of nails. A detachable house-like structure (the kubu or balutu) is often built in the center of the hull, with a removable decking known as lantai as the floor. The roof (sapaw) is made with plaited nipa leaves mounted on detachable Y-shaped posts. The portable cooking hearth (lappohan) is located in the stern deck, along with stored food (lutu) and water jars (kibut).

Lepa has a single sail (lamak), mounted on a mast socketed into the keel through the front decking. Like the roof posts, it can be detached as needed. Lepa can also be propelled by paddles (dayung) or quant poles. Modern lepa are almost universally fitted with motor engines.

Lepa can be differentiated from other native boats in the region (like the djenging and vinta, which are also used as houseboats) in that the lepa does not have outriggers. The prow and the stern are also made from flat carved blocks of wood, and not posts or curving planks as in vessels like the balangay. The bow (mundaˊ) and the stern (buliˊ) are low on the water to make the casting and gathering nets easier, as well as facilitate poling and rowing.

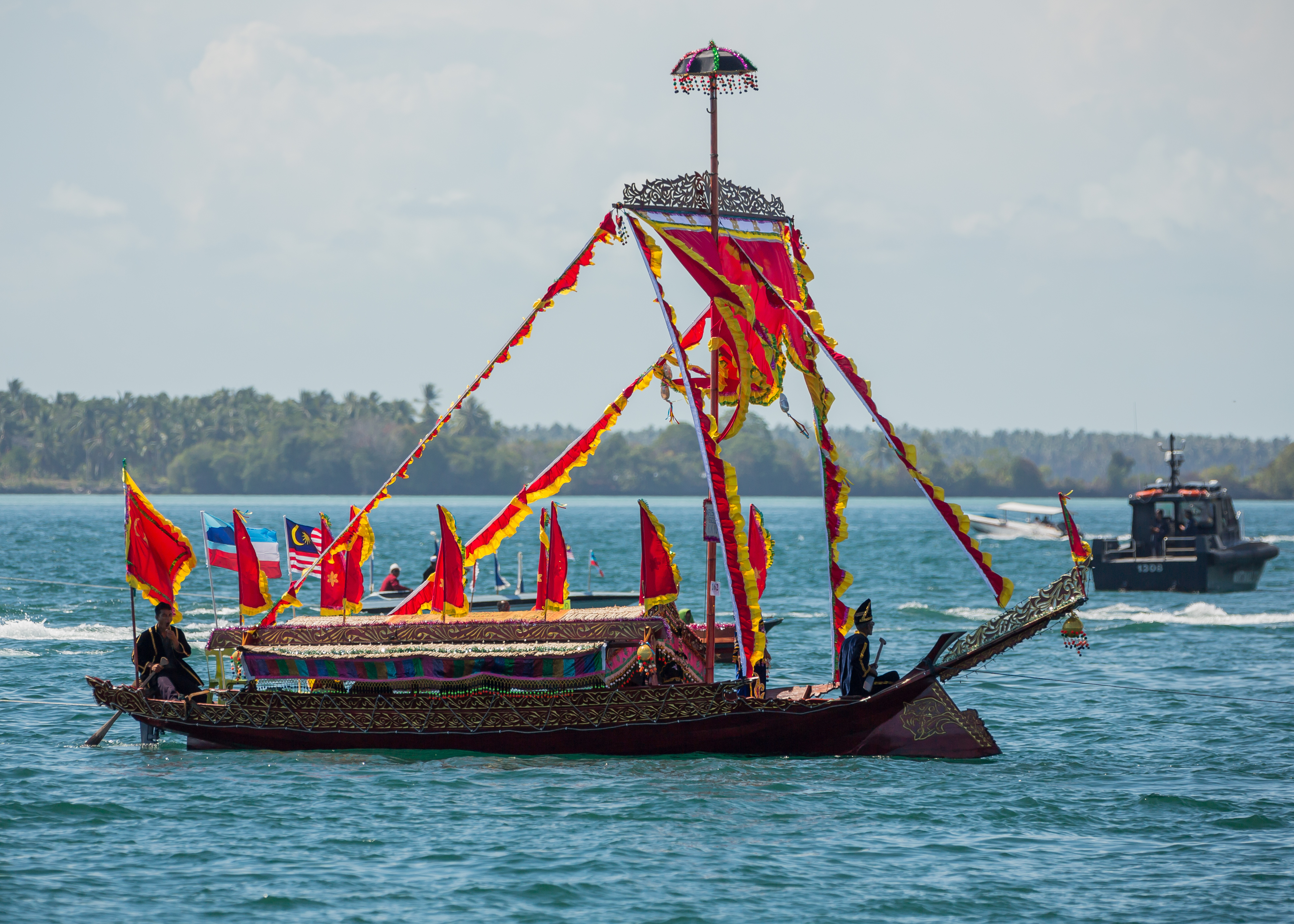
A lepa in the 2015 Regatta Lepa festival in Semporna, Malaysia

Lepa are traditionally decorated with elaborate flowery designs known as okil (also spelled ukkil). The prow, especially, often features a large beautifully-carved bowsprit called the jungal or jungar.

== Traditions ==
In the Philippines and Malaysia, there are usually no rituals involved in the making or the launching of the lepa, probably a result of the higher level of Islamization of indigenous Sama beliefs. In eastern Indonesia however, prayers and rituals are associated with the joining of the keel with the bow and stern blocks, and the drilling of the mast post (the "navel" of the ship). After the latter, the boat is launched for the first time, and symbolically becomes the child of the boat owner.

In the nomadic past of the Sama Dilaut, before a young man was to be married, his family would build or buy him a lepa, so he and his wife could live as an independent fishing unit. Upon his death, his lepa would be disassembled and served as his coffin for burial.

Before undertaking long or dangerous journeys, lepa are often blessed with magic spells (haligmun) by the village shaman. These include spells that supposedly makes them invisible to pirates or deflect bullets. Sama-Bajau also sometimes make a pledge (magjanji') to God (Tuhan) or to ancestor spirits (umboh) in a crisis at sea, or when a boat fails to return home. When the boat is safe, the pledge is paid by a thanksgiving feast called the magmaulud or magbajanji.

== Celebrations ==
Regatta Lepa is an annual boat festival in Semporna, Malaysia, celebrating the boatbuilding tradition of the Sama-Bajau communities in Sabah. Starting from 2019, Philippines start to introduce Lepa Festival as part of the celebrations for 46th Kamahardikaan Sin Tawi-Tawi (Provincial Day). This celebration symbolizes a deep appreciation for the wealth and culture of Tawi-Tawi which are predominantly inhabited by the Sama-Bajau people.

== See also ==
- Tempel (boat)
- Djenging
- Garay (ship)
- Balangay
- Kora kora
- Lancaran (ship)
- Guilalo
