= Tempel (boat) =

Tempel, also known as temper or kurikong, is a type of wooden motorized boat used by the Yakan, Tausug, and Sama-Bajau people of the Philippines. It is commonly used in the Sulu Archipelago and the Zamboanga Peninsula. It is around 48 ft (15 m) long, 11 ft (3.4 m) deep, and around 5 ft (1.5 m) at the widest point. It has a V-shaped cross-section at the front, though it is flat-bottomed on the stern for stability. It is commonly made from thick marine lauan plywood attached to ribs and caulked with epoxy. Tempel can also be made from fiberglass, though wood is preferred. Tempel are larger than the junkung but smaller than the kumpit. They are usually used as cargo ships.

== See also ==
- Lepa
- Vinta
- Djenging
- Garay (ship)
- Balangay
