= Torogan =

Traditional ancestral house in the Philippines

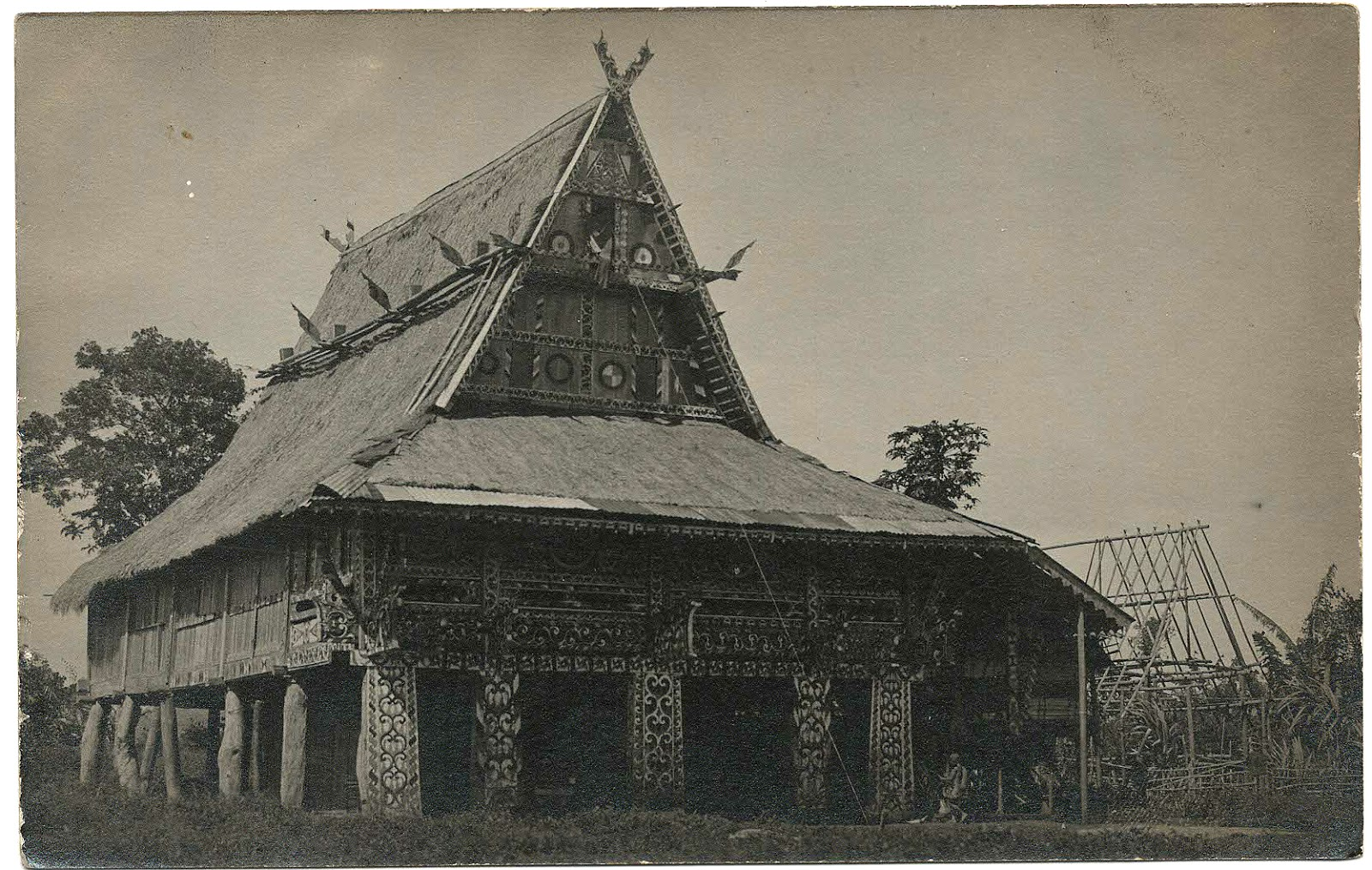
A torogan, c. 1908-1924

A torogan (lit. 'resting place' or 'sleeping place') is a type of traditional house belonging to the leaders of the Moro people in the Philippines. A torogan was a symbol of high social status. They were very large buildings and served as the residence to a datu of a Moro community, along with his retainers and their families. Nowadays, concrete houses are found all over Moro communities, but there remain torogans a hundred years old. The best-known are in Dayawan and Marawi City, and around Lake Lanao.

== Description ==
Torogan are massive structures built entirely without using nails. Instead, they use fitted joints and fiber lashings. They are usually the biggest structure in a village. They are elevated from the ground on large wooden columns, not all of them load-bearing. There are usually around 25 columns, but very large torogan can have as many as 56. Each column is made out of a single huge tree trunk, often transported over long distances from forests. The raising of the columns are individually celebrated by feasts. The corner (tukud) and front posts and the middle (tapuwilih) row of posts are intricately carved in okir designs painted in bright primary colors. Each post is supported at the base by five or six large boulders for protection against earthquakes, with one directly beneath it to prevent direct contact with the ground and inhibit rotting and termites. Each is usually capped at the top end with larger-diameter stone boulders that prevent vermin from entering the house.

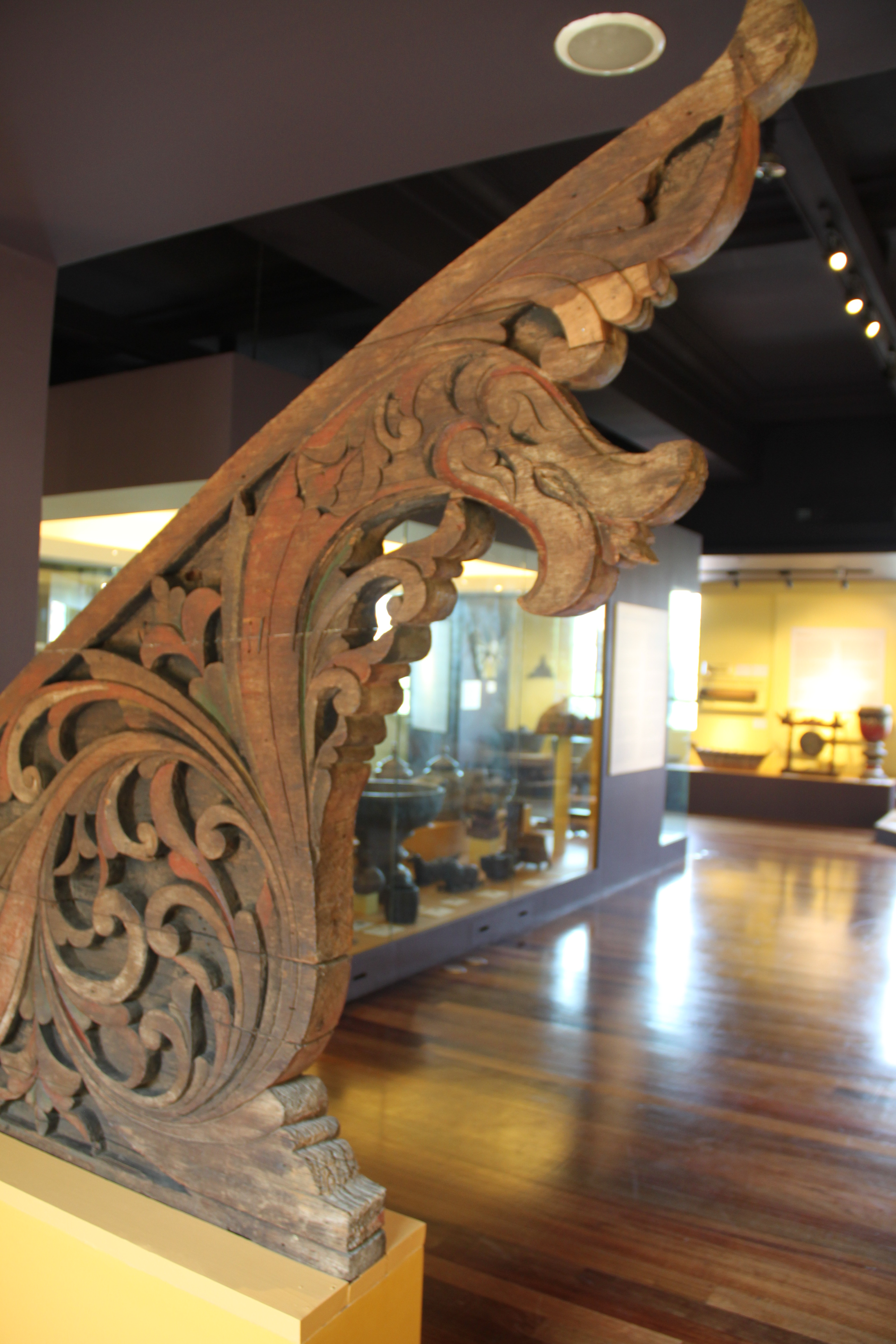
Detail of a panolong with a naga ("sea serpent") motif, from the National Museum of Anthropology. These were originally painted in bright primary colors.

Beams and a wooden floor (lantay) are then laid over the columns on which the main structure is built. The end of the beams (which are built facing east) are decorated with large wing-like carved wooden slabs called panolong (literally "prow"), which are representations of the same designs on the prows of the traditional Maranao boats (awang). They deliberately give the entire structure the appearance of a floating royal vessel held up by several canoes. The panolong are usually intricately carved with niyaga (also transcribed as naga or niaga, a mythical sea serpent) with open mouths, and other flowing okir designs. Each panolong has a different design, with the sixth one usually having a curling piyako (also pako or piako, "fern") motif. Smaller and less intricately carved panolong may also be found on the front left and front right sides of a torogan, especially those owned by powerful leaders. Carvings are also found beneath the window sills and on window and door frames. The narrow windows and doors are traditionally opened and closed by sliding them to the left or right along a wooden channel, a design type called sinongod. These are traditionally "locked" with pieces of wood that prevent them from sliding open.

The main floor (poro) has a square floor plan. It has no permanent partitions and no ceiling, and thus appears as a large hall. It is used both for sleeping and other activities. During night time, mattresses (made from straw and woven mats) and pillows are brought out and the interior is separated into "rooms" for sleeping by hand-embroidered colorful cloth dividers, rattan or split-bamboo screens, and thick bed curtains (kolambo, which also serve as mosquito nets) for privacy. These are usually hung from horizontal cloth sheets hung directly from the rafters, thus forming tent-like structures. Multiple families live inside a torogan, with the main "rooms" being that of the leader and his family. Indentured servants and slaves and their family have "rooms" in the back near the kitchen area, while the family in charge of protecting the leader have their "rooms" near the entrance. A kulintang ensemble is also usually present near the leader's bedroom. Each "room" is bordered inside the cloth dividers with rows of wooden chests, brassware (gador), porcelain (solang), and other furniture which serve as containers for personal belongings (including weapons), artwork, food, and water. The actual walls of the torogan are also decorated with various types of patterned woven cloth.

During daytime, most of the beds and dividers are cleared and the space is used for working (like weaving textiles), eating, praying, or meeting visitors. Activities are usually kept to a minimum early in the morning when some "rooms" are still up, but gradually become busier as all the occupants wake up. A kitchen area is located at the back of the torogan, with the floor about half a meter lower than the rest of the space. It contains a rectangular bamboo platform called the bantolang filled with earth and ashes that serves as a fireplace. Each bantolang can usually hold two datola, which is an arrangement of three small rocks on which cooking vessels are placed. On top of the bantolang is a bamboo rack called the tapaan, which is where fish or meat is smoked for preservation. Baskets with covers (called balengkat) are also hung on horizontal bamboo poles (tabak) on one side of the kitchen, and are used as food storage. Water for cooking and drinking is stored on bamboo containers called laya which are hung on the kitchen walls. Torogan are usually built near the shores of Lake Lanao, so the bathroom and toilet facilities are on adjacent structures (most notably the diamban, which is a platform built over the water used for bathing). The torogan also has an internal bathroom which is simply an enclosed space with a narrow slit on the floor and a clay jar of water.

Torogan have a distinctively shaped hip-and-gable roof made from thatched palm leaves. The flaring edges taper shallowly towards a steep central gable aligned to the east. The central gable is supported internally by vertical posts called pulaos bungan, which in turn is supported by the intricately carved central beam of the roof called the tinai a walai (literally "intestine of the house"). The torogan was also surrounded by a wide open space called the lama, where other activities are also held. The lama commonly had a horse-racing track crossing it, called the paso-ay. The area beneath the main floor is called the dorung, which is also used for various purposes like storage or keeping domestic animals.

== Cultural significance ==
Torogan are pre-colonial and date to before the conversion of the Moro people to Islam. They were of great importance to Moro communities and were symbols of wealth and power. They primarily served as the residence of the leader of a community, ranging from village leaders (datu) to the sultans of the federation of Maranao states. Audience with the leader is usually done inside the torogan. Most visitors speak with the leader from the lower part of the bed nearest to the door (an area known as the dasigan). Favored guests, on the other hand, are usually invited to sit or lie down on the mattress itself (the sendigan), which is regarded as a place of honor. Torogan and their grounds also serve as the community social hall where feasts, weddings, games, funerals, meetings, and other social and cultural activities are held.

== Conservation ==
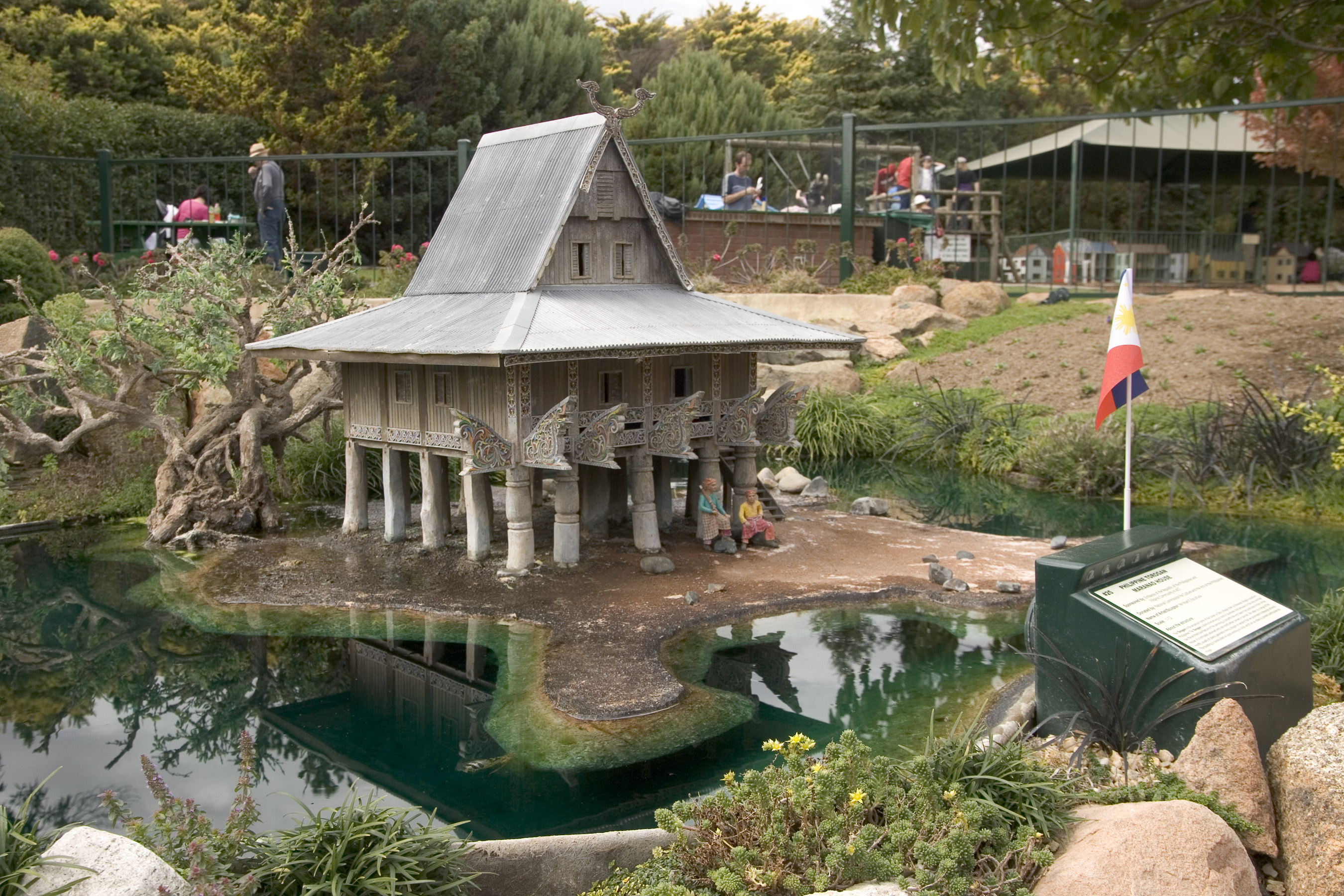
Model of a torogan at the Cockington Green Gardens

The Kawayan Torogan, built by Sultan sa Kawayan Makaantal in Bubung Malanding, Marantao, Lanao del Sur, the last remaining habitable torogan, was declared as a National Cultural Treasure by the National Museum of the Philippines in 2008.

There are also existing torogans in various locations in Lanao such as the Dayawan Torogan of Marawi and Laguindab Torogan of Ganassi. All are in need of massive funding for their rehabilitation. These collection of torogans from various towns in Lanao are being pushed to be included in the tentative list of the Philippines in the UNESCO World Heritage List.

A torogan built in 1873 in Lanao del Sur for a Maranao nobleman, Togoran I Sabino Lakowa, has also been purchased and restored by the private park and resort hotel Las Casas Filipinas de Acuzar in Bataan, and is now part of the Casa Maranao exhibition. Like other similar purchases, this has been met with some criticism due to the relocation and commercialization of heritage houses. However, Las Casas Filipinas has defended the relocations as the only way to restore and preserve the heritage houses for future generations, which in most cases were neglected and decaying in their original locations.

== See also ==
- Architecture of the Philippines
- List of mosques in the Philippines
- Bahay kubo
- Bahay na bato
- Rumah adat
- Malay house
- Traditional Thai house
- Latte stone
