= Junkun =

Indigenous Philippines canoe

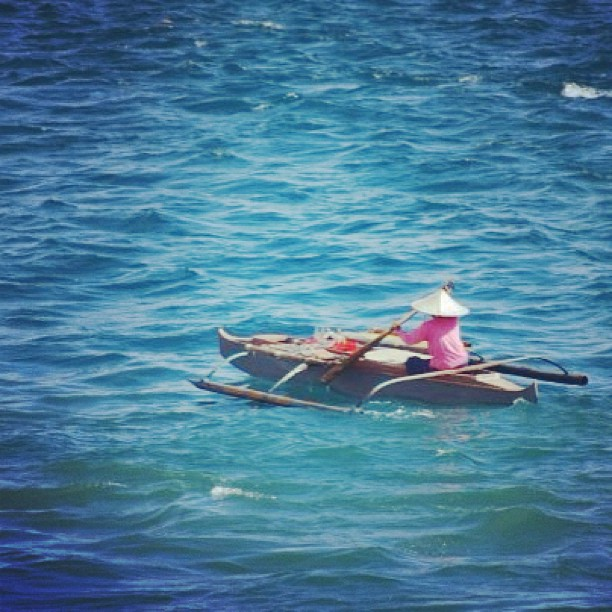
A Sama-Bajau junkun from Zamboanga City, Mindanao

Junkun, is a type of small dugout canoe of the Sama-Bajau people of the Philippines. They are usually made from a single log, though a single plank can be added to the sides, and longer boats can include ribs that support a deck made of planks. They are around 2.5 to 8 m (8.2 to 26.2 ft) long. They have knob-like protrusions on the tip of the prow and the stern, which also sweep upwards from the waterline. They are sometimes equipped with double outriggers. They are used for fishing and short-distance travel.

== See also ==
- Buggoh
- Birau (boat)
- Owong
- Tiririt
- Vinta
- Djenging
- Garay (ship)
- Balangay
