= Buggoh =

Filipino naval vessel

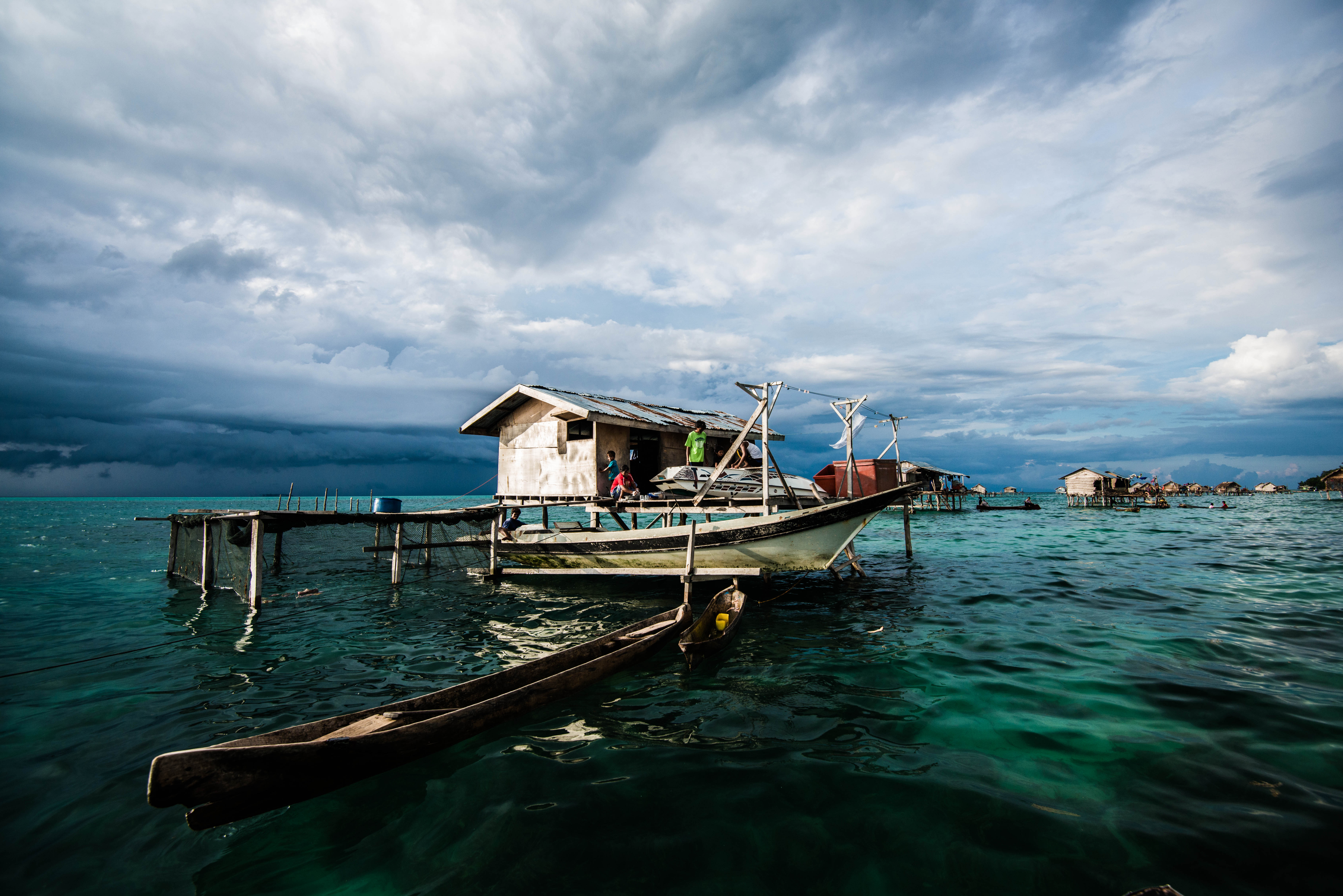
A buggoh (foreground) in Bohey Dulang Island, Sabah, Borneo

Buggoh is a type of small dugout canoe of the Sama-Bajau people of the Philippines. They are made from a single log hollowed into a canoe with a rounded bottom. It is equal-ended, with the prow and the stern dropping straight down or sloping outward. They are sometimes equipped with two outrigger floats. They are usually around 1.5 to 4.5 m (4.9 to 14.8 ft) long. It is also known by various other names, including boggo', buggoh jungalan, buggoh-buggoh, or beggong.

Buggoh are commonly towed by larger houseboats like the lepa. They are used to ferry people and goods from the mothership to the coast or to other ships. They are also used to assist in fishing. Buggoh is very similar to the birau, but differs in the shape of the prow and the stern.

== See also ==
- Junkun
- Vinta
- Owong
- Awang (boat)
- Djenging
- Garay (ship)
- Balangay
