= Birau (boat) =

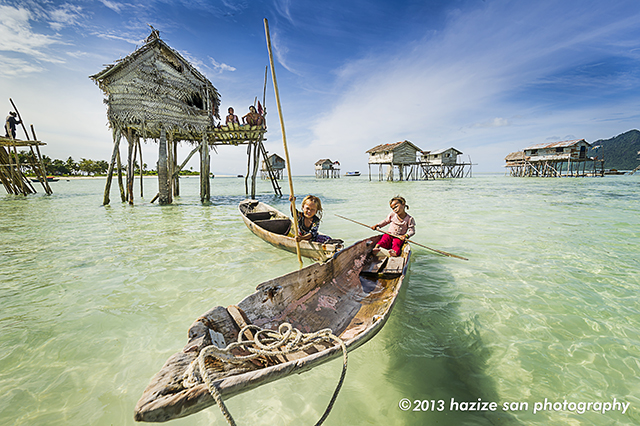
Sama-Bajau children on birau from Semporna, Sabah, Malaysia

Birau, is a type of small dugout canoe of the Sama-Bajau people of the Philippines. They are made from a single log hollowed into a canoe with a rounded bottom. The prow and stern of the vessel usually has knob-like protrusions. A smaller wider variant without these knobs is known as bitok. Birau are usually around 1.5 to 4.5 m (4.9 to 14.8 ft) long. They are sometimes equipped with two outrigger floats. They are very similar to the buggoh, differing only in that the prow and the stern of the birau slope inward.

== See also ==
- Junkun
- Owong
- Vinta
- Djenging
- Garay (ship)
- Balangay
