= Awang (boat) =

Type of dugout canoe

Awang are traditional dugout canoes of the Maranao and Maguindanao people in the Philippines. They are used primarily in Lake Lanao, the Pulangi River, and the Liguasan Marsh for fishing or for transporting goods. They have long low hulls that are carved from single trunks of lauan and apitong trees. They are propelled by paddling or by sail, and commonly have a pair of bamboo outriggers. The prow and the stern are elaborately decorated with painted designs and okir carvings, usually of the piyako and potiyok a rabong motifs. Some awang are also decorated with a carved prow extension known as the panolong or kalandapon.

Modern awang became much shorter and far less ornate than the traditional awang after World War II. They are in danger of disappearing.

== See also ==
- Owong
- Avang
- Buggoh
- Vinta
