= Okir =

Southeast Asian folk motifs and designs

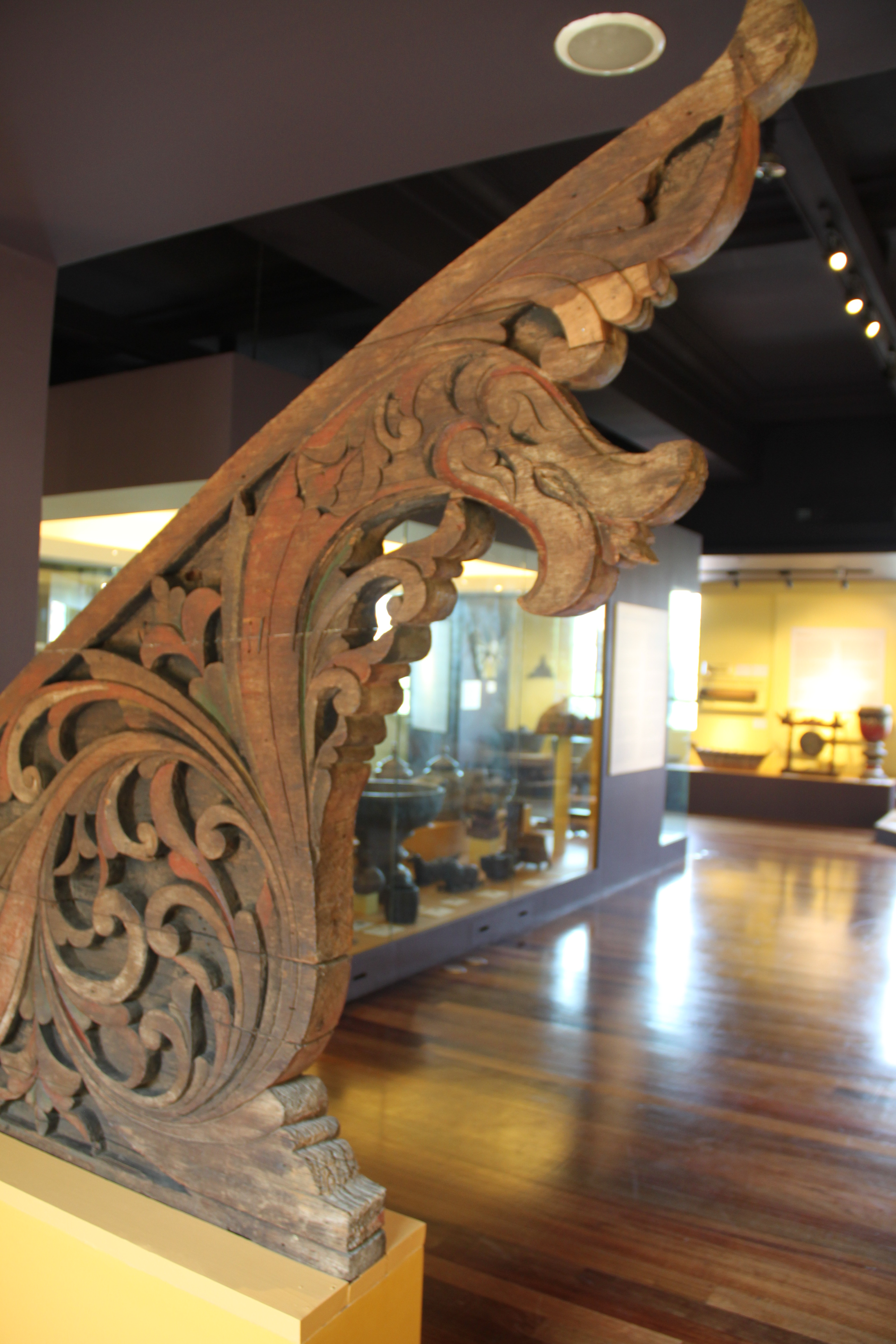
Detail of a panolong with a naga motif, from the National Museum of Anthropology

Okir, also spelled okil or ukkil, is the term for rectilinear and curvilinear plant-based designs and folk motifs that can be usually found among the Moro and Lumad people of the Southern Philippines, as well as parts of Sabah. It is particularly associated with the artwork of the Maranao and Sama (Badjao) tribes, although it can also be found to a lesser extent among the Maguindanao, Iranun, Tausug, Yakan, and Lumad groups. The design elements vary among these ethnic groups, with the greatest refinement being found among the Maranao.

== History ==
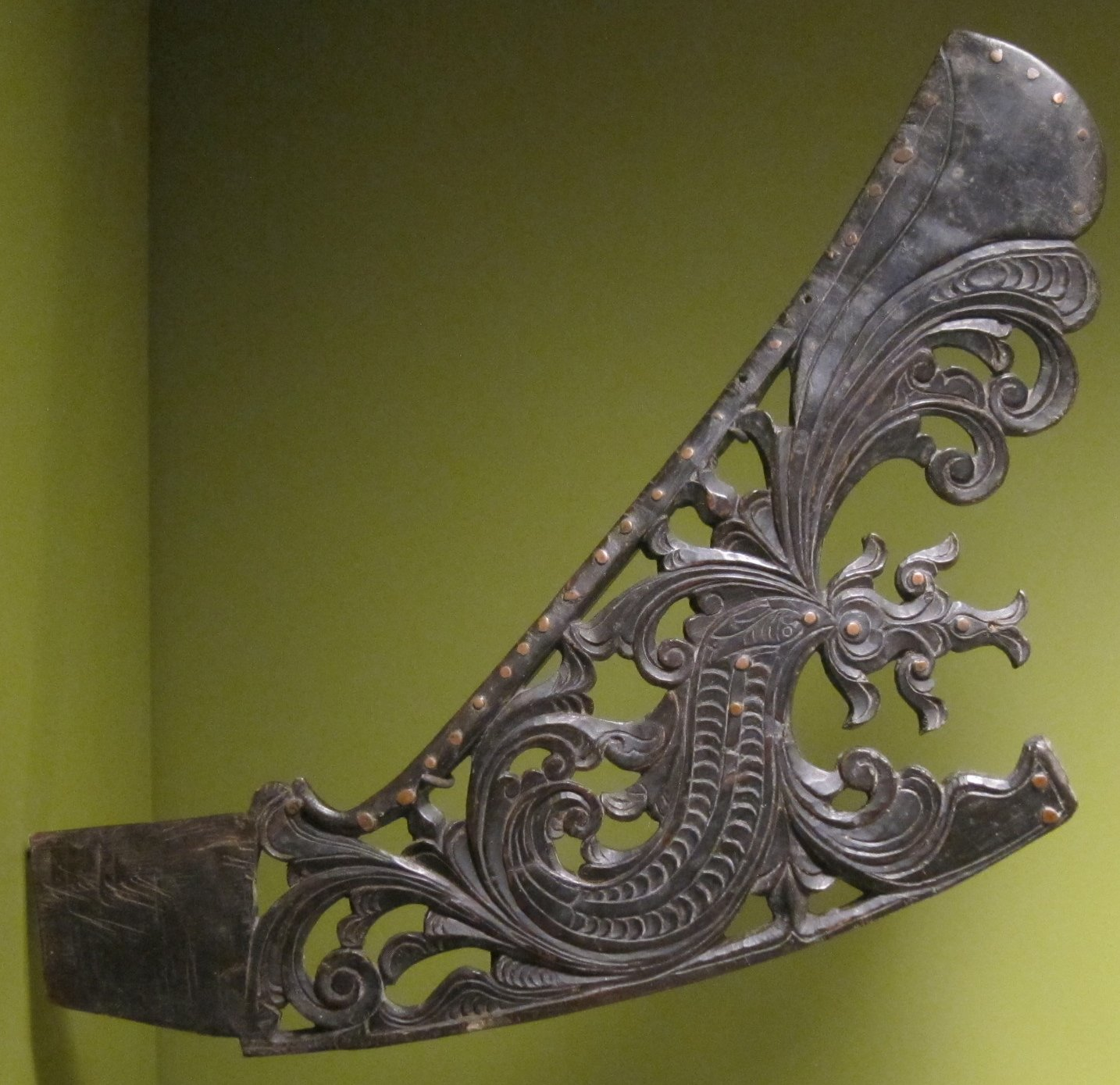
A Maranao kubing jaw harp handle made from horn and brass with an S-shaped naga design and a fish

The origins of okir are pre-Islamic. They are believed to have originated from the much earlier okil or okil-okil decorative carving traditions of the Sama (Badjao) people, which are often highly individualistic and rectilinear. The Sama are master carvers, and they made lavish decorations on ritual animistic objects, grave markers (both in wood and stone), and their houseboats. These precursor forms of the okir designs can still be found in the art traditions of the Maranao in the basak (lowland) regions of Lake Lanao, and they contrast markedly from the later flowing okir designs.

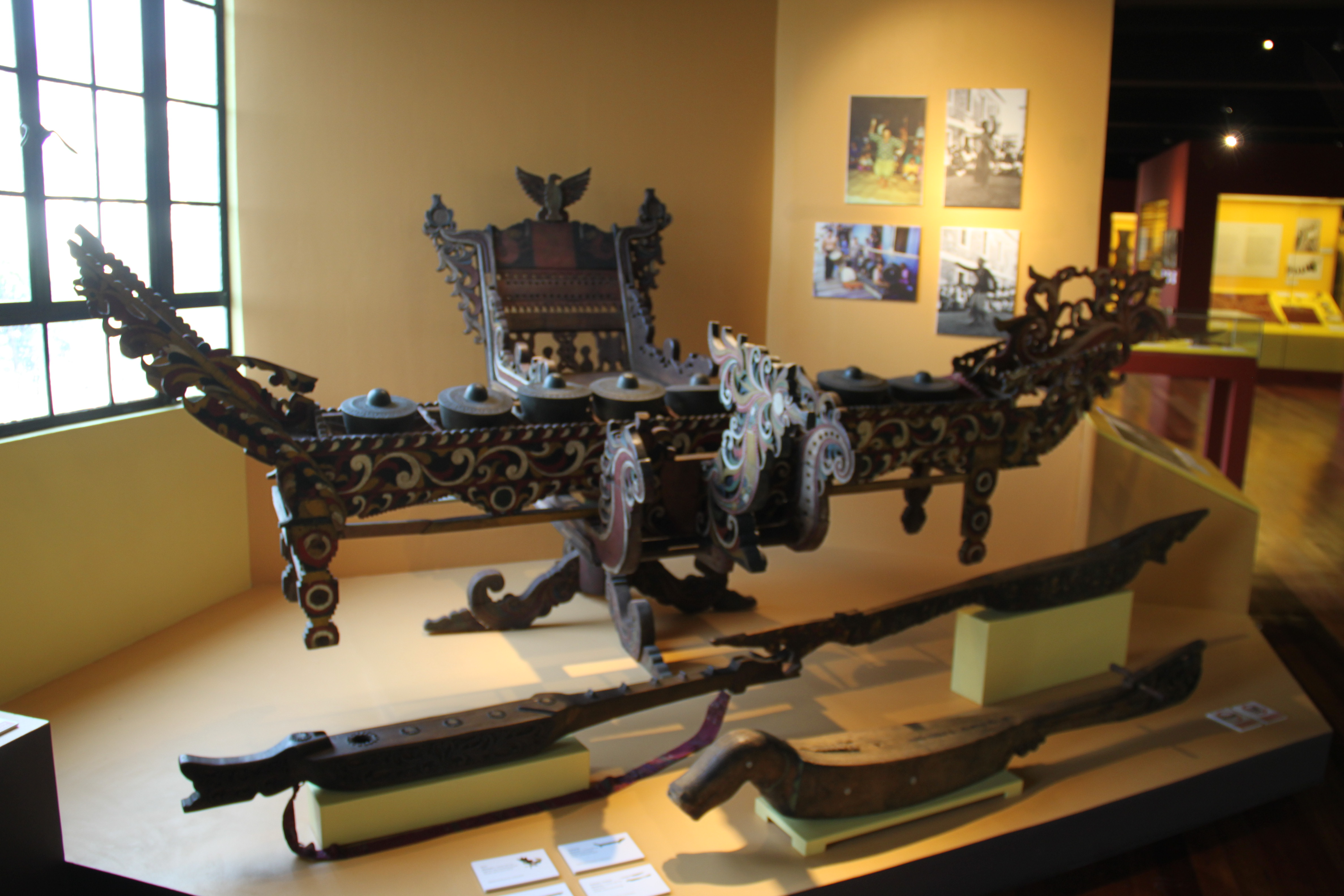
A Maranao kulintang ensemble

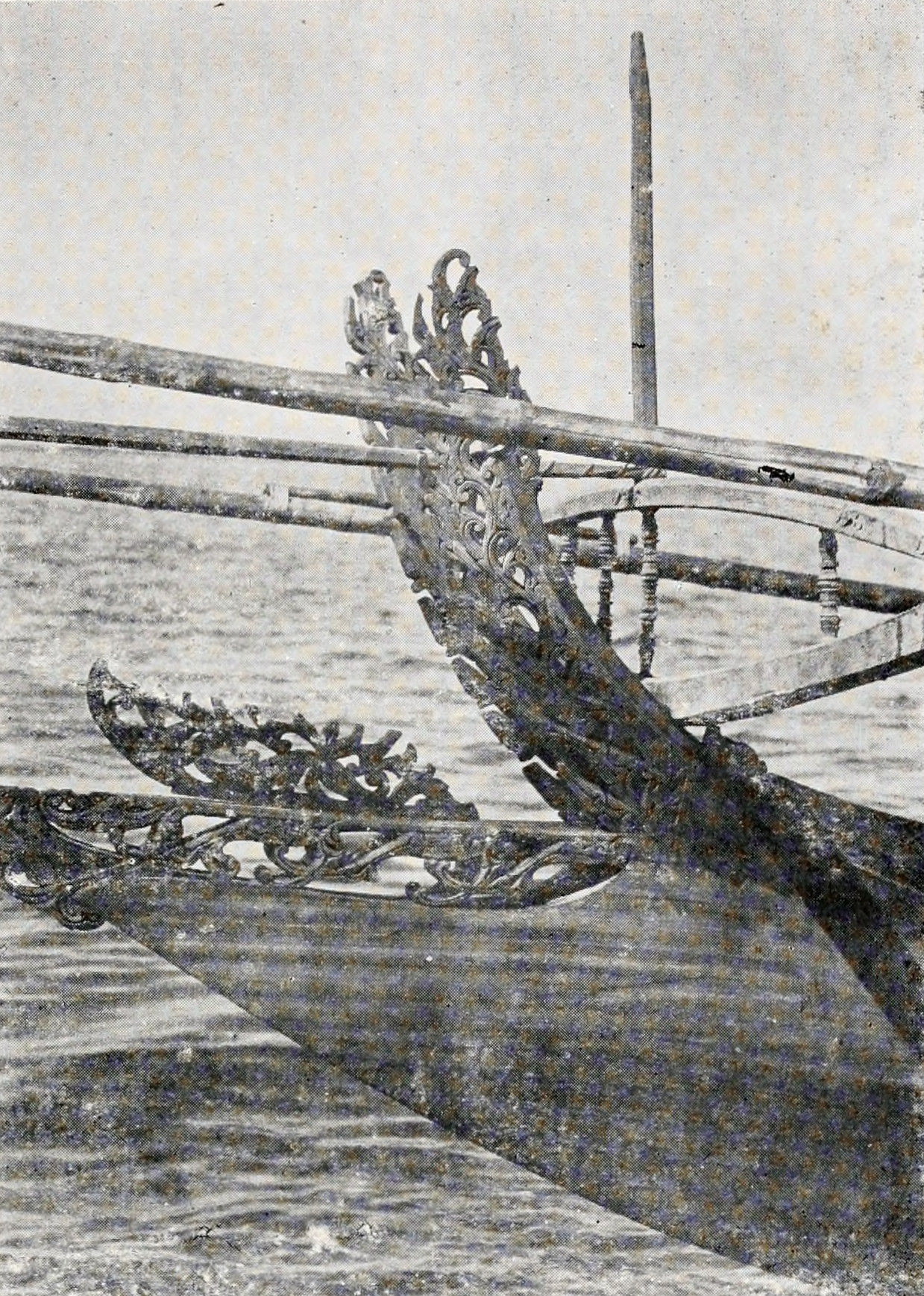
Detail of okil carvings on a Sama-Bajau vinta

The rectilinear designs of the Sama were adopted and refined by the Maranao to decorate the torogan houses of the ruling dato class. The most prominent parts of the torogan are the panolong, the carved floor beams modeled after awang boat prows. These protrude in the front of the house and styled with elaborate okir designs, usually that of a naga (a sea serpent or dragon). These were meant to drive away evil spirits. Okir were also featured in the central housebeam, the tinai a walai ("intestine of the house"), which had ritual significance.

Unlike the decorative carving traditions of the Sama, the panolong of the torogan became a symbol of power and status. As such, they increasingly became more and more elaborate, developing the flowing characteristics that it possesses today. It influenced other Maranao artforms greatly due to its association with rank and prestige, becoming used in textiles, musical instruments, betel quid containers, sculptures, weaponry, silver inlays, and so on. These designs became the standard for what came to be known as okir.

From the Maranao, this spread to nearby regions through the migrations of the Iranun people (the descendants of the merchant and outcast clans of Maranao). Elements of okir have been adopted by the neighboring Maguindanao, Lumad, Yakan, and Tausug peoples of the Mindanao and the Sulu Archipelago; even influencing the carving traditions of the Sama later on. However, it had limited penetration among the Visayan-descended heavily-Islamized Tausug, the dominant ethnic group of Sulu. They viewed such carvings as "pagan". Okir among the Tausug is usually limited to the hilts and scabbards of weapons.

== Elements and motifs ==
=== Sama ===
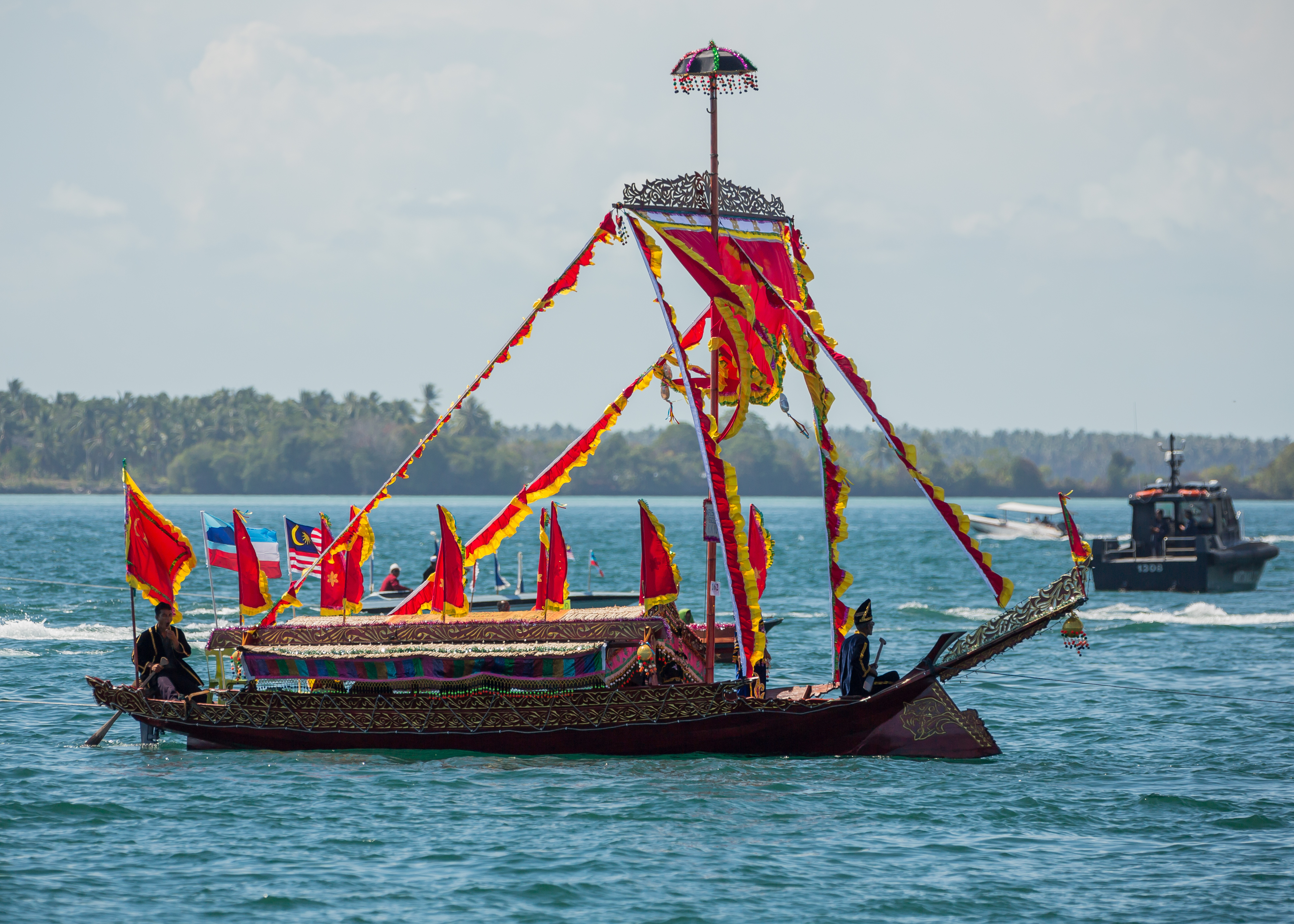
A Sama lepa with okil carvings

The older Sama carving traditions (okil or okil-okil, sometimes spelled ukkil among Malaysian Sama) differ markedly from the okir of the Maranao, although elements of the okir were incorporated into later Sama carvings. Sama okil aren't bound to rules like the okir, and thus tend to be highly variable. Each artist carves according to his own tastes. Despite this, there are still shared motifs that bind them all together as Sama.

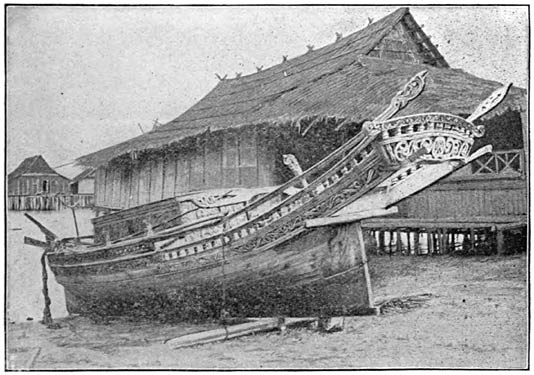
A Sama lepa houseboat with okil designs on the stern

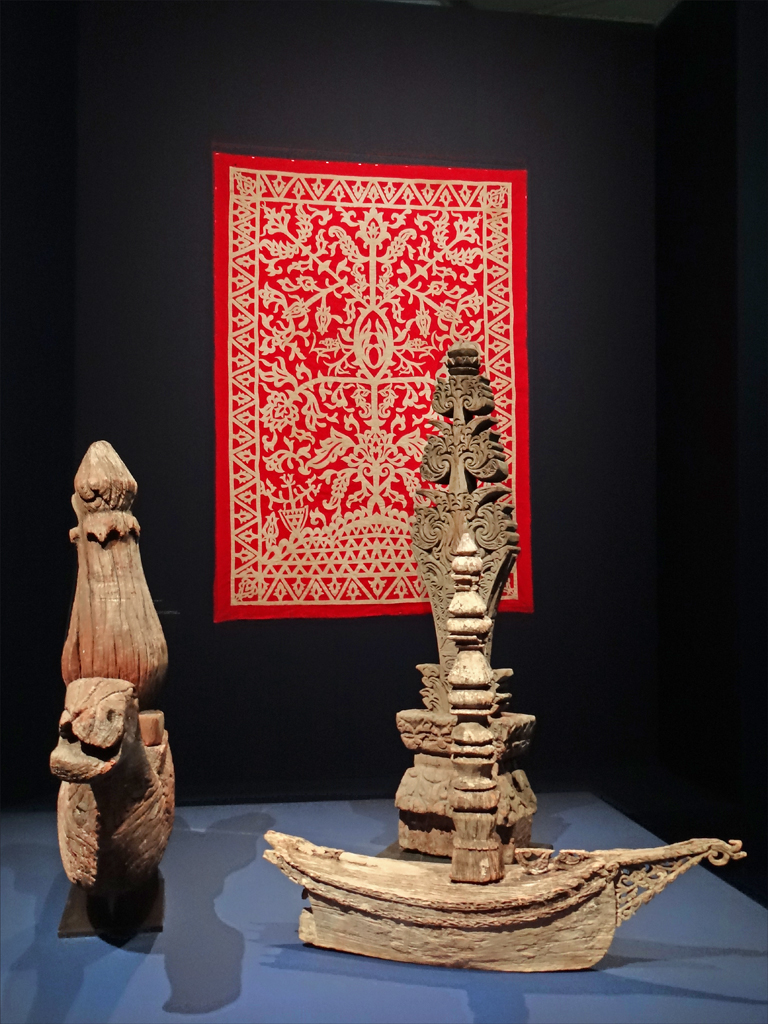
Sama sunduk grave markers

Sama okil can be divided into two types. The most ancient okil which still survive among the animist Sama, usually the sea-going Sama Dilaut branches, feature representational artforms like human figures. These are absent in the okil versions of the Sama that converted to Islam. Sama okil also feature designs which are realistic copies of natural forms, rather than stylized designs like in okir. Marine themes are particularly common, including depictions of dugongs (duyong), usually with a person riding on its back. The three most common okil motifs used by the Muslim Sama are dauan-dauan (leaf motifs), kaloon (curlicues and curved lines), and agta-agta or buaya (fish or crocodile motifs).

Nevertheless, Sama okil share some common motifs with okir. The Maranao naga (sea serpent) figure is believed to be related to the Sama agta-agta motifs. They are a particularly common motif in the beautifully-carved prows, sterns, and gunwales of various Sama-Bajau boats.

Okil are also highly important among Sama grave markers (sunduk) which are found in the ancient traditional burial grounds of the Sama people in some (usually uninhabited) islands of Sulu and Tawi-Tawi. These include some of the oldest examples of okil, which are usually carved from coral and limestone. Wooden carved grave markers are common later on, usually made from or carved from the boat belonging to the deceased. These are usually carved into human figures that represent the deceased. With graves of women identifiable by the presence of combs and mirrors, and graves of men by the depiction of head coverings. Graves of children usually have smaller figures. A common relatively recent tradition is the carving of elaborate stylized bed frames as grave markers. These graves are often decorated with buntings and food offerings, again reflecting the ancient ancestor worship (anito) traditions of the Sama.

=== Maranao ===
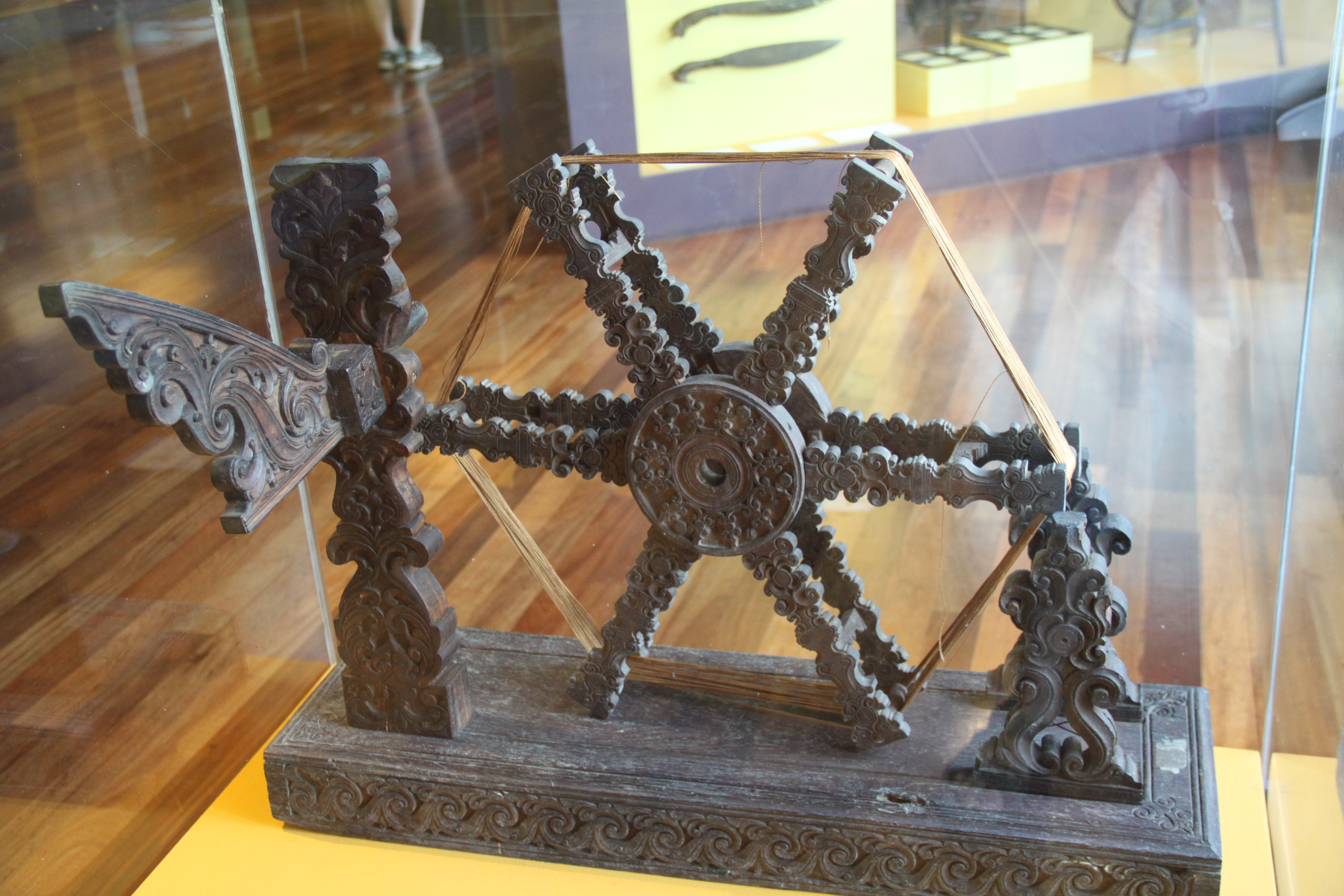
A Maranao spinning wheel (note the panolong-shaped projection)

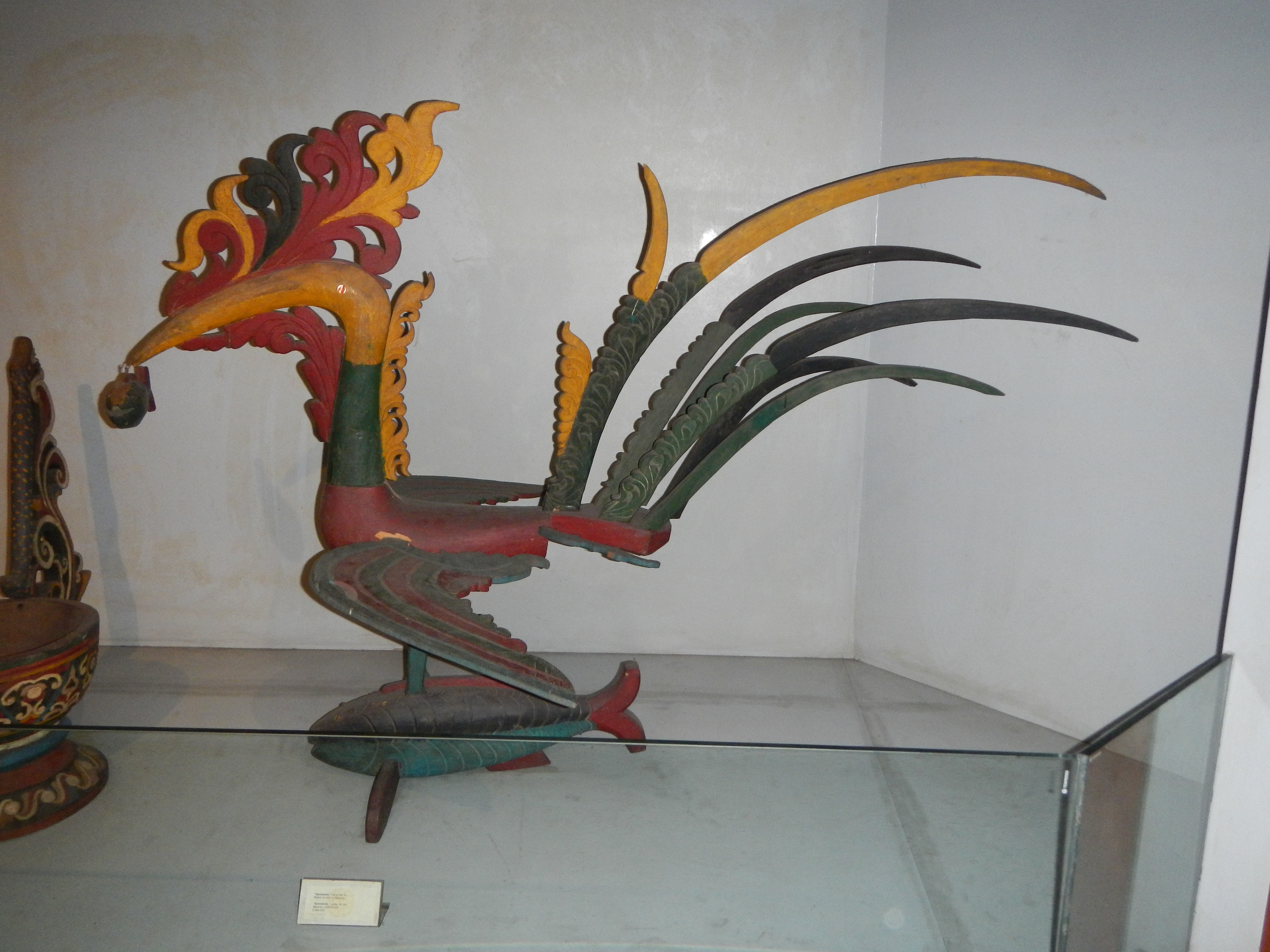
A sarimanok

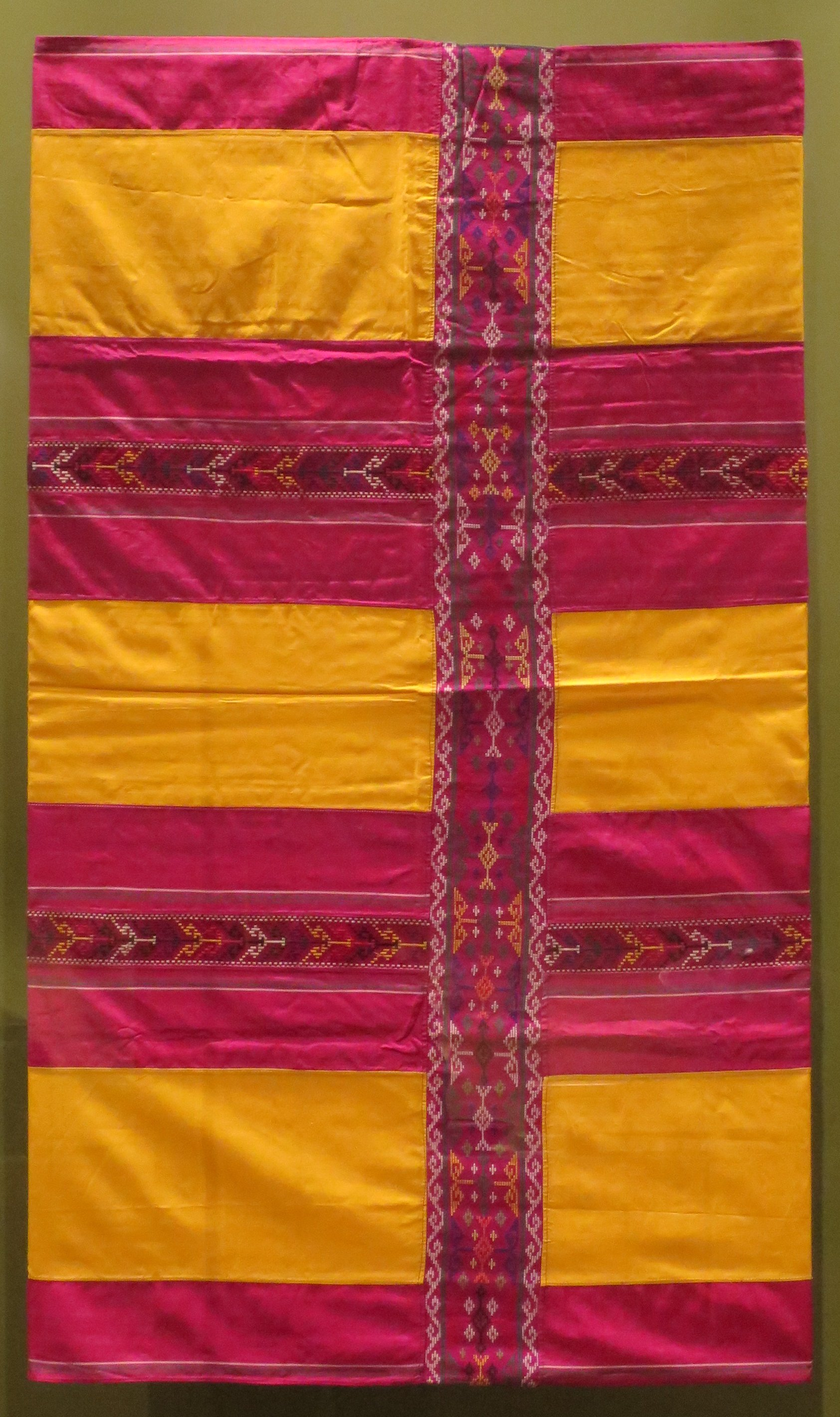
A Maranao malong with a langkit (decorative strip) featuring female okir designs

Maranao okir motifs are so stylized that it is often easy to tell whether a carving is Maranao or not. Other ethnic groups usually introduce other elements or motifs that are non-traditional to the original Maranao okir designs. In the past, okir designs, particularly for textiles, are distinctive enough that a Maranao can usually distinguish which region someone is from based only on the patterns of their malong and their woven decorative strips (langkit).

Maranao okir can be divided into two traditions, the predominantly curvilinear "male" okir-a-dato, and the predominantly rectilinear "female" okir-a-bai. Unlike Sama okil, okir designs are deliberately stylized when depicting living things, due to Islamic beliefs against idolatry. Traditional creatures featured in okir are the naga (sea serpent) and the sarimanok (feminine papanok, a rooster-like bird with a fish in its beak and another fish in its claws). The naga is common in the panolong designs, while sarimanok are usually placed on top of poles during celebrations. Other creature motifs traditionally depicted in okir include crocodiles, parrots, grasshopper heads, and swallowtails. After contact with other cultures, okir has also depicted non-native animals, including lions, peacocks, and elephants.

The most common individual elements of okir include the following:

Male (okir-a-dato)

- Dapal or raon - a leaf
- Dianawi - a pattern resembling a nawi, a bladed carpenter's tool
- Gaglat - a pattern resembling a glat, a small kitchen knife
- Kianoko - fingernail-like patterns
- Matilak - a circle
- Naga - a sea serpent in the shape of an 'S'
- Onga - fruit
- Pako - a fern frond or a spiral
- Pako lawi - a fern frond resembling a rooster feather
- Pako longat - a fern frond with a cut at one edge
- Pako nai - a fern frond with two or more cuts on one edge
- Piowas - betel nut seed
- Potyok - a bud
- Todi - a flower

Female (okir-a-bai)

- Olan-olan - a circle or moon
- Biangon - rectangle
- Pialang - square
- Katimbuang - diamond
- Onsod - zigzag

These elements can be put together to create motifs. Some examples include:

Male

- Armalis - a combination of a fern, leaf, and bud
- Birdo - a motif of combined complex designs propagating horizontally, vertically, or diagonally
- Magoyoda - a motif of simple elements repeating horizontally
- Niaga - a motif which features the naga along with todi designs of leaves, vines, and flowers
- Obid-obid or tiali-tali - rope-like designs that are usually used for borders
- Pako rabong - a motif of a fern growing vertically, with a central point from which the design radiates outwards

Female

- Binotoon - star patterns
- Pinagapat - four-sided designs in a series
- Pinatola - a pattern of squares of different colors
- Saragonting - a cross

Complete designs using these motifs are usually given poetic names like sapak a madanding ("branch of happiness"), raon a kayo ("tree leaves") or tring indawa ("yellow bamboo").

== Modern traditions ==
Okir-carving traditions among the Maranao is prominent in the town of Tugaya, Lanao del Sur. It is the traditional center of Maranao artisans and is the industrial capital of Lanao del Sur.

== See also ==
- T'nalak
