= Owong =

Traditional canoe

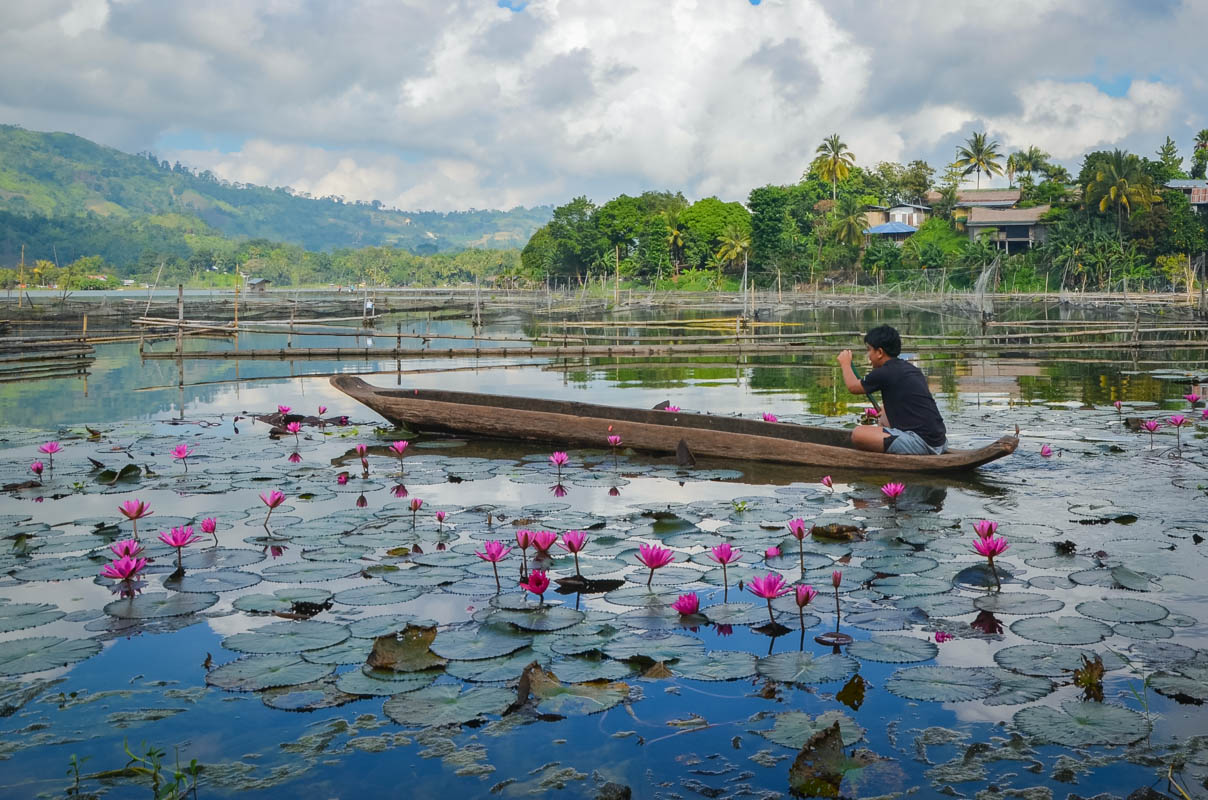
An owong in Lake Sebu

Owong, also spelled owung, are traditional small dugout canoes of the T'boli people in the Philippines. It is traditionally made from the hollowed out trunks of lawaan (Shorea spp.). It is propelled by paddling and can carry around three people. It is used by the T'boli people for fishing and transport in Lake Sebu, Lake Lahit, and Lake S'loton in their ancestral territory in southwestern Mindanao.

== See also ==
- Awang (boat)
- Buggoh
- Birau (boat)
- Junkun
- Balangay
