= Djenging =

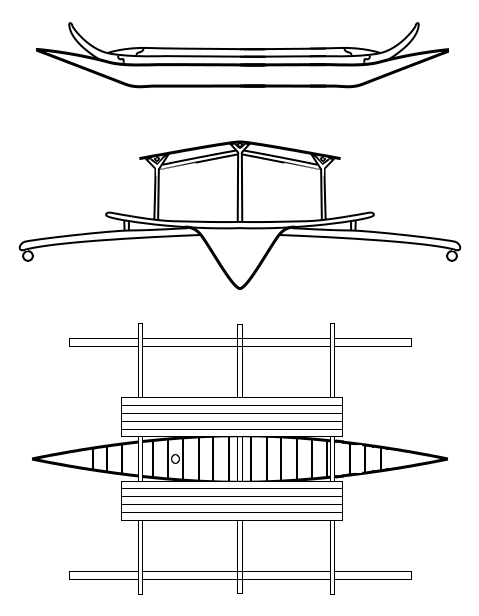
Side, front, and top view of a djenging

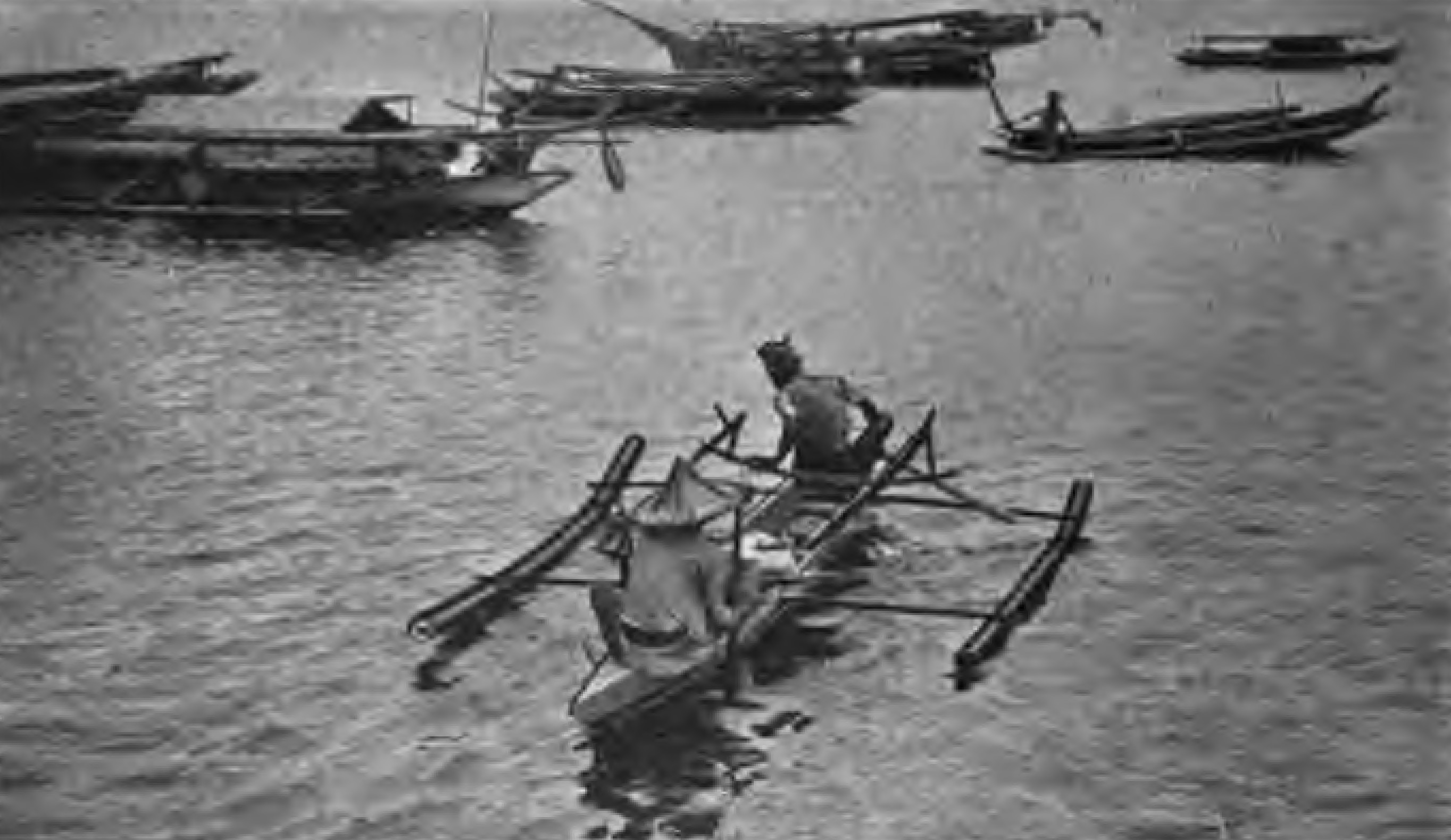
Fishing boats in Jolo, Sulu (c.1917). A djenging is visible on the upper left.

Djenging is a type of large double-outrigger plank boat built by the Sama-Bajau people of the Philippines. It is typically used as a houseboat, though it can be converted to a sailing ship. It was the original type of houseboat used by the Sama-Bajau before it was largely replaced by the lepa after World War II. Larger versions of djenging were also known as balutu or kubu, often elaborately carved with bifurcated extensions on the prow and stern.

== Description ==
The djenging is made from a dugout keel (baran balutu) built up at the sides with two planks (tapid and lingkam) attached by dowels. It is usually around 4.5 m (15 ft) long, though it can commonly reach up to 11 m (36 ft) in length. It is usually equal-ended, with the prow and the stern indistinguishable from each other. It has two to four outrigger booms (batangan) attached to bamboo floats (katig) which are parallel to the main hull. The tips of the floats do not extend beyond the prow and stern. Secondary booms (sa'am) also extend from the hull and function as extensions of the removable deck (lantay) made of split bamboo. A central house-like structure known as the palau is located in the middle, similar to the vinta and the lepa. The palau can be taken down to erect a mast and convert the ship into a sailing ship for transport or fishing.

Larger versions of djenging are known as balutu or kubu. They are often permanently moored around anchorages (sambuangan). They were elaborately carved with okil designs painted with bright colors, with the typical bifurcated extensions on both the prow and the stern known as buaya ("crocodile"). The house structure of the balutu is known as the kubu (hence the name), and unlike in smaller djenging, it is permanently attached. They are propelled by poling or by paddling.

Djenging and balutu are very similar to the vinta, but differs mainly in the shape of the hull section and the relative lengths and placement of the outriggers.

== Conservation ==
As of the 1990s, balutu have almost completely disappeared among the Sama-Bajau of Tawi-Tawi and the Sulu Archipelago. Djenging have also started to disappear. They are replaced by the outrigger-less lepa, which are easier to sail, as they do not require the house structure to be taken down.

== See also ==
- Vinta
- Balangay
- Tempel (boat)
- Sama-Bajau people
- Outrigger boat
- Austronesian people
