= Vinta =

Traditional outrigger boat from the Philippine island of Mindanao

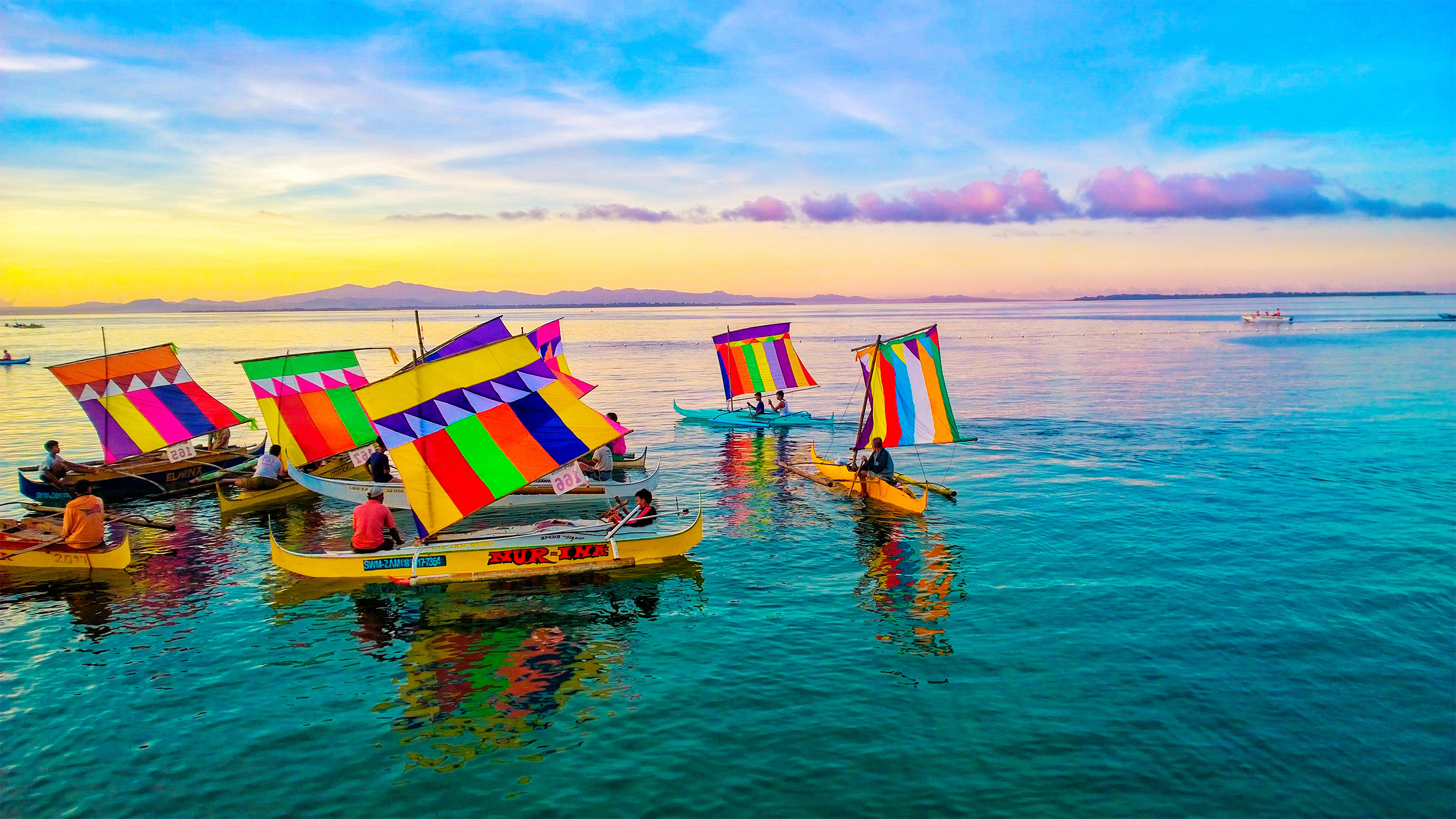
Vintas in Zamboanga City

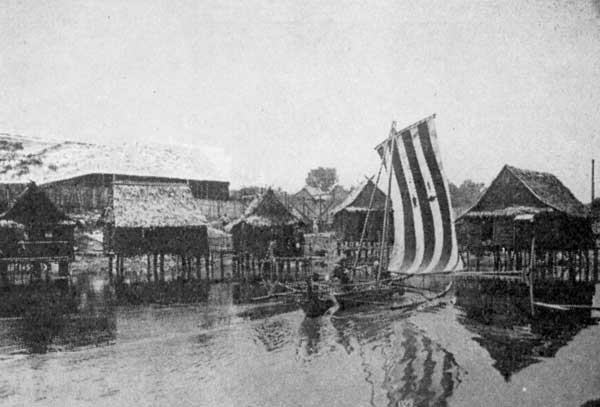
A Sama-Bajau fishing vinta in Zamboanga with the characteristic colorful sails (c.1923)

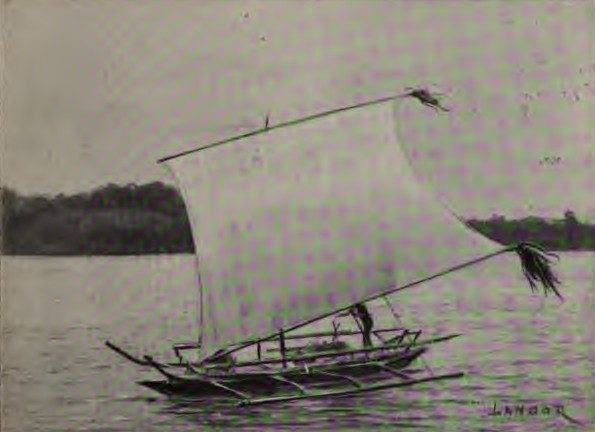
A small Sama-Bajau tondaan with sails deployed (c.1904)

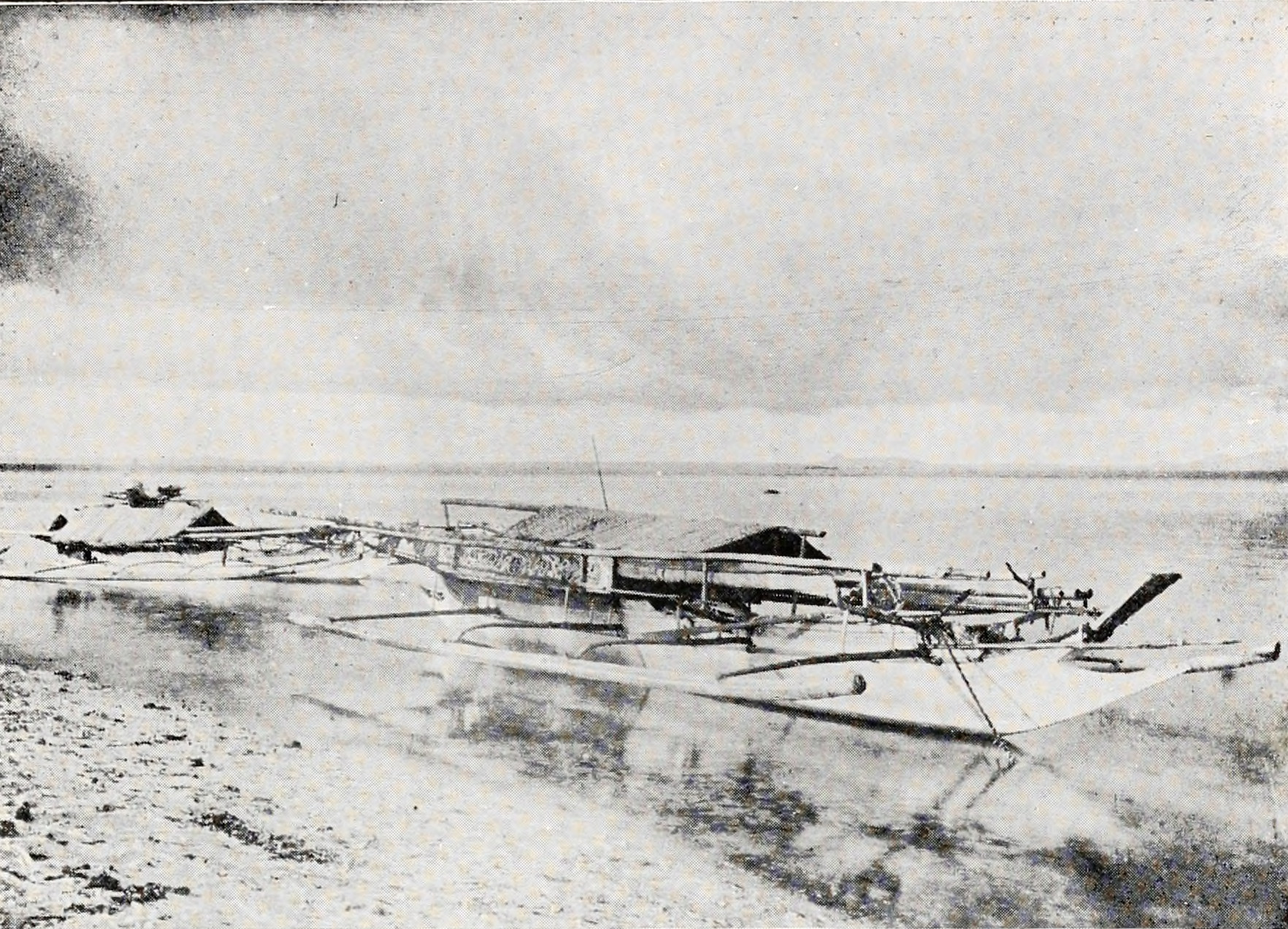
Two large Moro vinta from Mindanao in the houseboat (palau) configuration (c.1920)

The vinta is a traditional outrigger boat from the Philippine island of Mindanao. The boats are made by Sama-Bajau, Tausug and Yakan peoples living in the Sulu Archipelago, Zamboanga peninsula, and southern Mindanao. It is also made by the Sama-Bajau that lived in east coast of Sabah, Malaysia. Vinta are characterized by their colorful rectangular lug sails (bukay) and bifurcated prows and sterns, which resemble the gaping mouth of a crocodile. Vinta are used as fishing vessels, cargo ships, and houseboats. Smaller undecorated versions of the vinta used for fishing and transportation are known as tondaan and bogo-lamak.

The name "vinta" is predominantly used in Zamboanga, Basilan, and other parts of mainland Mindanao. It is also known as pilang or pelang among the Sama-Bajau of the Tawi-Tawi islands; dapang or depang among the Tausug in Sulu; balanda or binta among the Yakan in Basilan; and bogo-lamak among the Sama-Bajau in the east coast of Sabah. It can also be generically referred to as lepa-lepa, sakayan, or bangka, which are native names for small outrigger vessels.

== Description ==
The vinta has a deep and narrow hull formed from a U-shaped dugout keel (baran) built up with five planks on each side. It is usually around 4.5 to 10 m (15 to 33 ft) in length. The most distinctive feature of the vinta hull is the prow, which is carved in the likeness of the gaping mouth of a crocodile (buaya). It is composed of two parts, the lower part is known as saplun, while the flaring upper part is known as palansar, both are usually elaborately carved with okil motifs. The stern has two upper extensions (the sangpad-sangpad) which either emerge from the back in a V-shape, or are separated by a space in the middle. The stern may or may not feature okil carvings like the prow. Vinta hulls are traditionally made from red lawaan wood; while the dowels, ribs, and sometimes parts of the outrigger are made from bakawan (mangrove) wood.

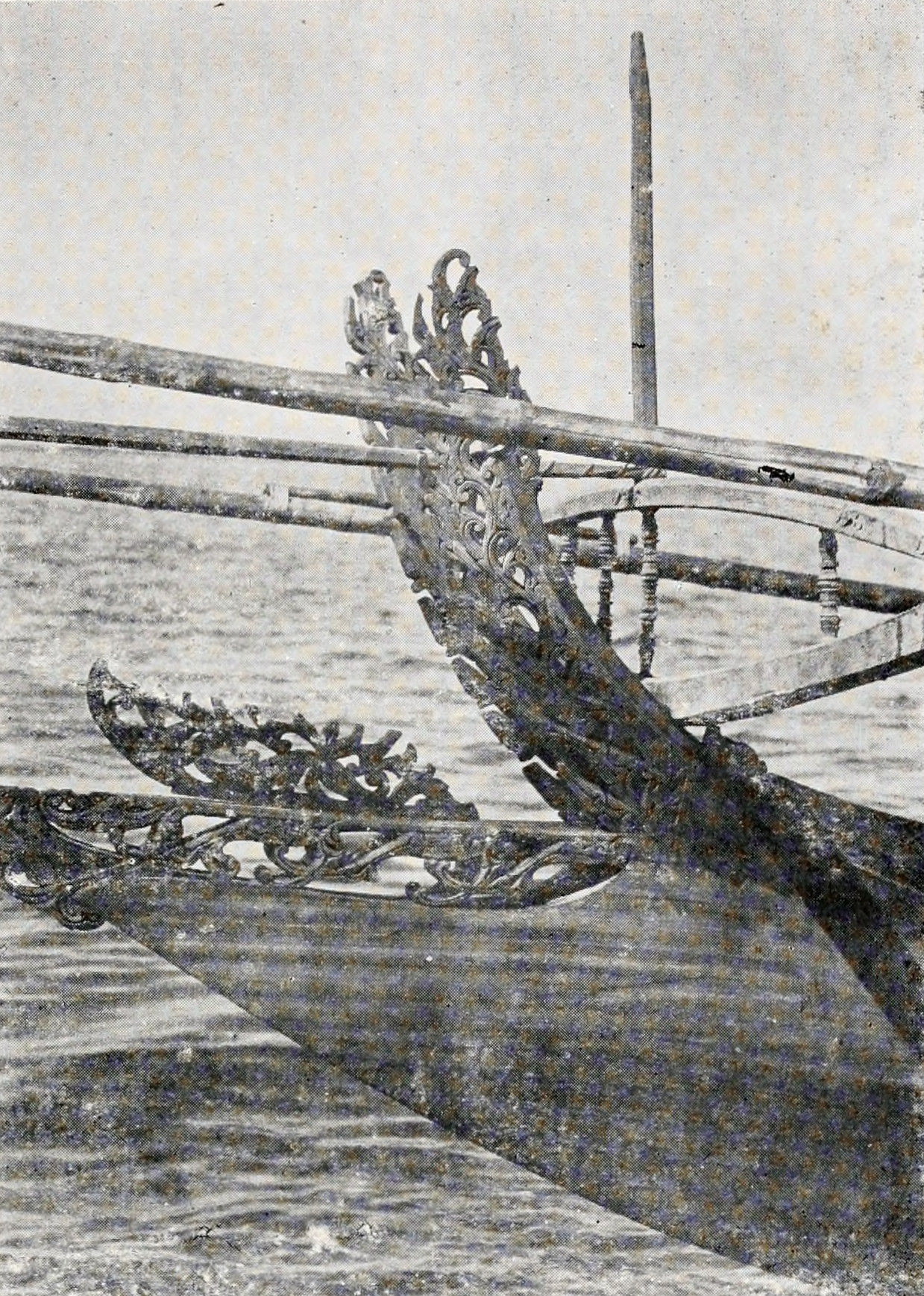
Detail of okil carvings on a vinta stern (c.1920)

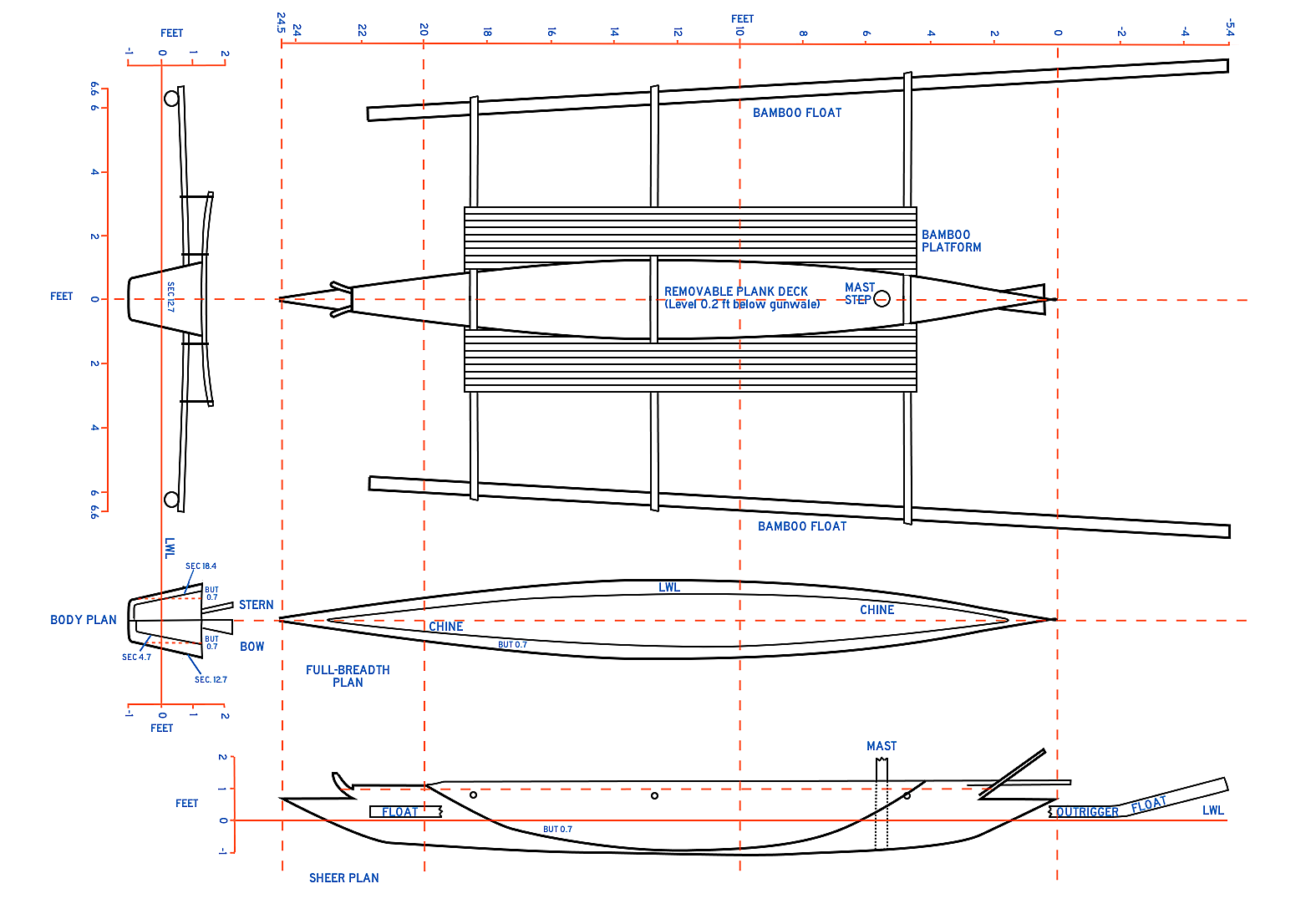
Plan, midships section, and lines of a vinta (Doran, 1972)

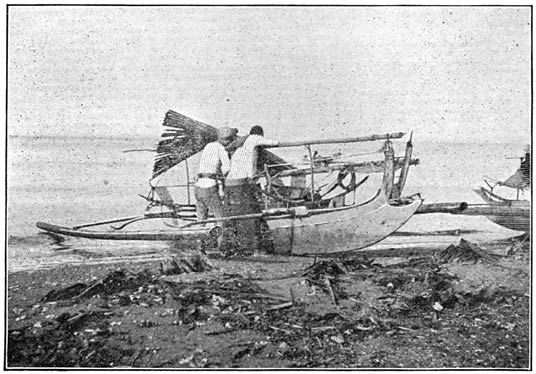
A small Moro vinta (tondaan) from the Philippines (c. 1905) showing the bifurcated stern

The hull is covered by a removable deck made of planks or split bamboo. It has a central house-like structure known as the palau. This is used as a living space especially for vinta which are used as houseboats by the Sama-Bajau. The palau can be taken down to convert the houseboat into a sailing boat. However, this is usually only done when absolutely necessary for vinta which function as houseboats. When traveling, vinta are usually paddled or poled in shallow and calm coastal waters, with frequent stops along the way for supplies. They only sail when crossing seas between islands in a hurry.

Vinta have two bamboo outrigger floats (katig) which are supported by booms (batangan). Large boats can have as many as four batangan for each outrigger. The floats are slightly diagonal, with the front tips wider apart than the rear tips. The front tips of the floats also extend past the prow and curve upwards, while the rear tips do not extend beyond the stern. Additional booms (sa'am) also extend out from the hull and the main booms. These provide support for a covering of planks (lantay) which serve as extensions of the deck.

Vinta are usually rigged with a rectangular lug sail locally known as bukay, on a biped mast slotted near the front section. These are traditionally decorated with colorful vertical strips of the traditional Sama-Bajau colors of red, blue, green, yellow, and white. The patterns and colors used are usually specific to a particular family or clan. Traditional vinta sails, like other sails of traditional Filipino vessels use woven mats (banig) of pandanus leaves.

Smaller sailing versions of the vinta used for fishing and transportation are known as "tondaan" or "bogo-lamak". They are usually undecorated and lack the upper prow and stern attachments. The tondaan are rigged with a mast and a sail at all times, though a temporary palau can be erected amidships if necessary. Bogo-lamak on the other hand can't be installed with temporary palau but they are built with detachable mast and sail. Modern vinta are usually tondaan or bogo-lamak instead of the larger houseboats. Like other traditional boats in the Philippines since the 1970s, they are almost always motorized and have largely lost their sails. The modern bogo-lamak from Sabah, Malaysia are also converted into pumpboat which still use sail to save its engine fuel. The sail will be used when there's a strong wind current and with this condition, it can even beat the engine power of the pumpboat itself.

Along with the balangay, lightly armed vinta were also used in the civilian squadrons of the Marina Sutil ("Light Navy") of Zamboanga City and Spanish-controlled settlements in Mindanao and the Visayas in the late 18th to early 19th centuries, as defense fleets against Moro Raiders.

== Carvings ==
Vinta are usually carved with okil designs, similar to the lepa and djenging boats of the Sama-Bajau people. The three most common motifs are dauan-dauan (leaf-like designs), kaloon (curved lines), and agta-agta (fish designs). All three are used in carving the buaya design of the prow. The hull of the vinta is decorated with one to three strips of curvilinear carvings known as bahan-bahan (meaning "bending" or "curving"), which are reminiscent of waves. In new boats, these designs can be painted with the same colors as the sails, but once the paint wears off, it is usually not repainted.

== Reconstructions ==
In 1985 the vinta Sarimanok was sailed from Bali to Madagascar to replicate ancient seafaring techniques.

Zamboanga City celebrates vintas in the annual Regatta de Zamboanga during the city's Zamboanga Hermosa Festival each October. The participants are usually Sama-Bajau fishermen from the coastal areas of Zamboanga. Many of these modern "vinta" however, are not vinta, but are other types of bangka (like bigiw) that merely use a vinta-patterned sail (often non-functional).

In 2016, Jolo, Sulu, also started holding an annual Vinta Festival each February 14.

== Other uses ==
"Vinta" is also the name of a Moro dance that commemorates the migration of Filipinos into the archipelago. In the dance, dancers imitating the movements of the vinta (vessel) by balancing perilously on top of poles. Parents for Education Foundation (PAREF) schools in the Philippines have adopted the vinta as their symbol.

== Gallery ==
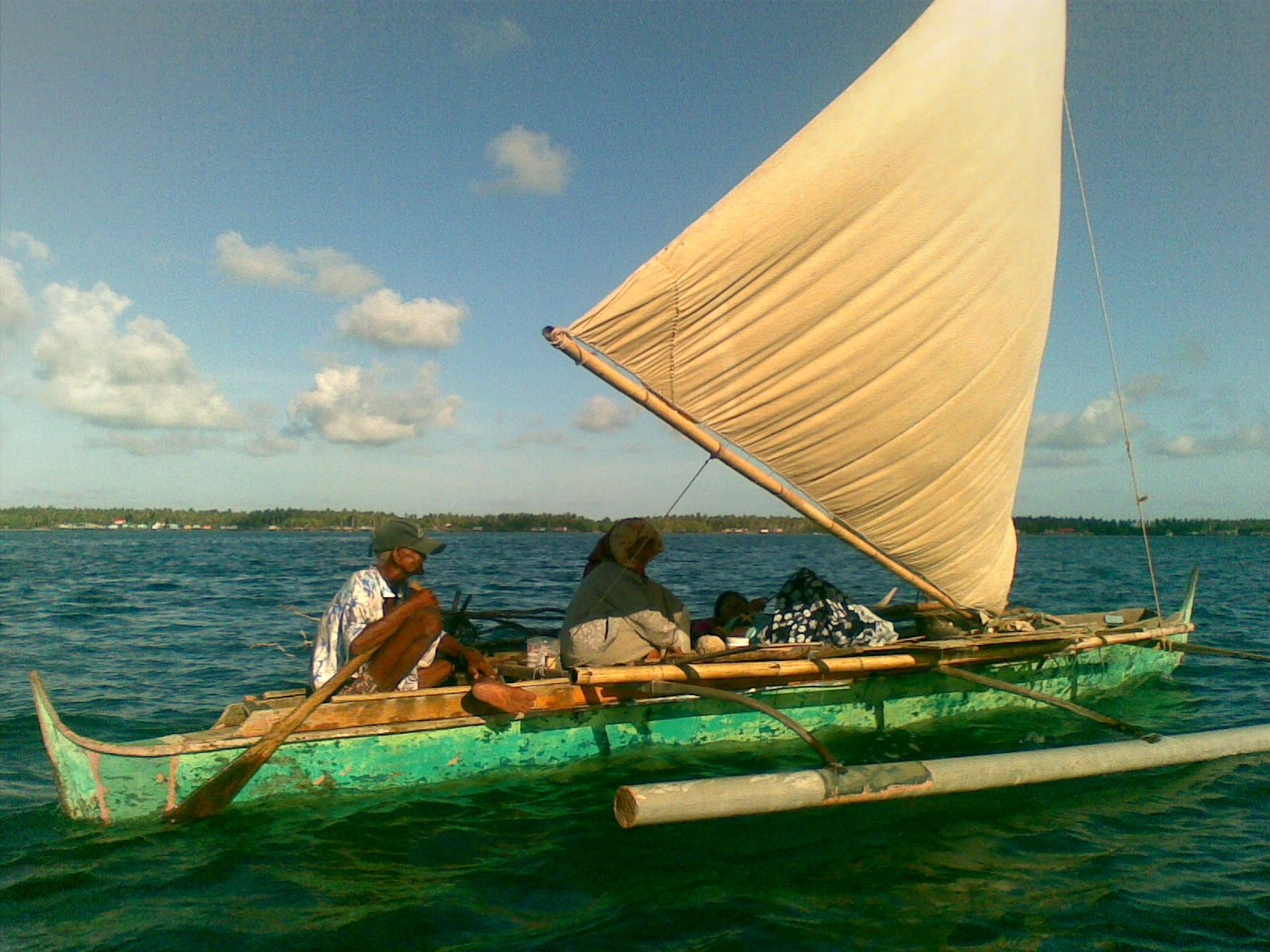
A modern undecorated tondaan or bogo-lamak without the prow and stern extensions and with a plain sail from the Sama-Bajau of Sabah

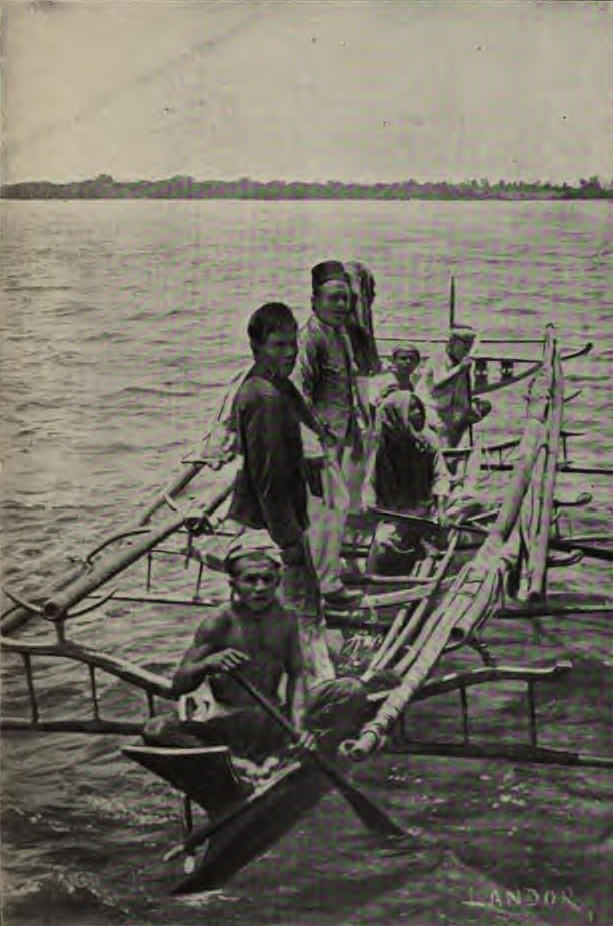
A tondaan with the sails detached and rolled up in Tawi-Tawi (c.1904)

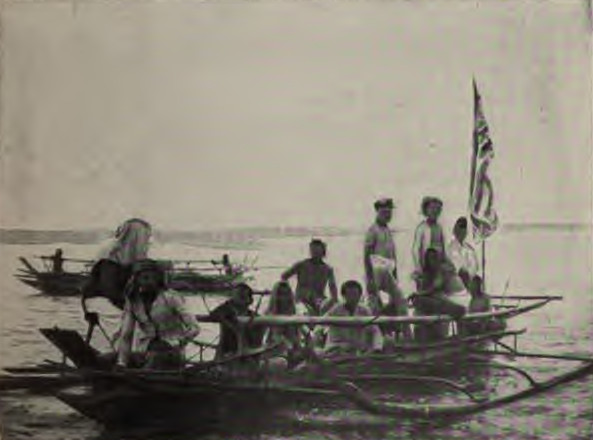
Two tondaan from Tawi-Tawi (c.1904)

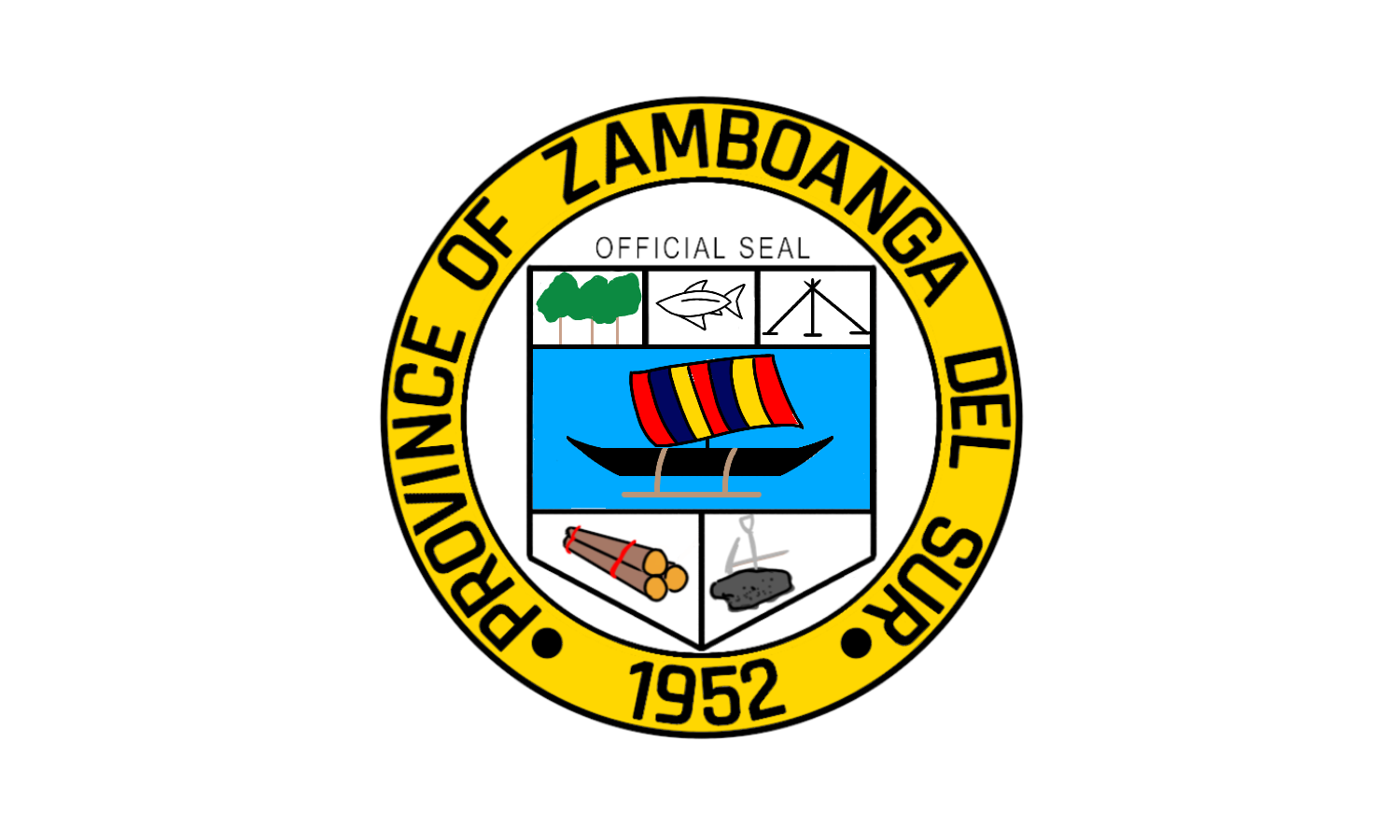
Flag of Zamboanga del Sur with a stylized depiction of a vinta in full sail

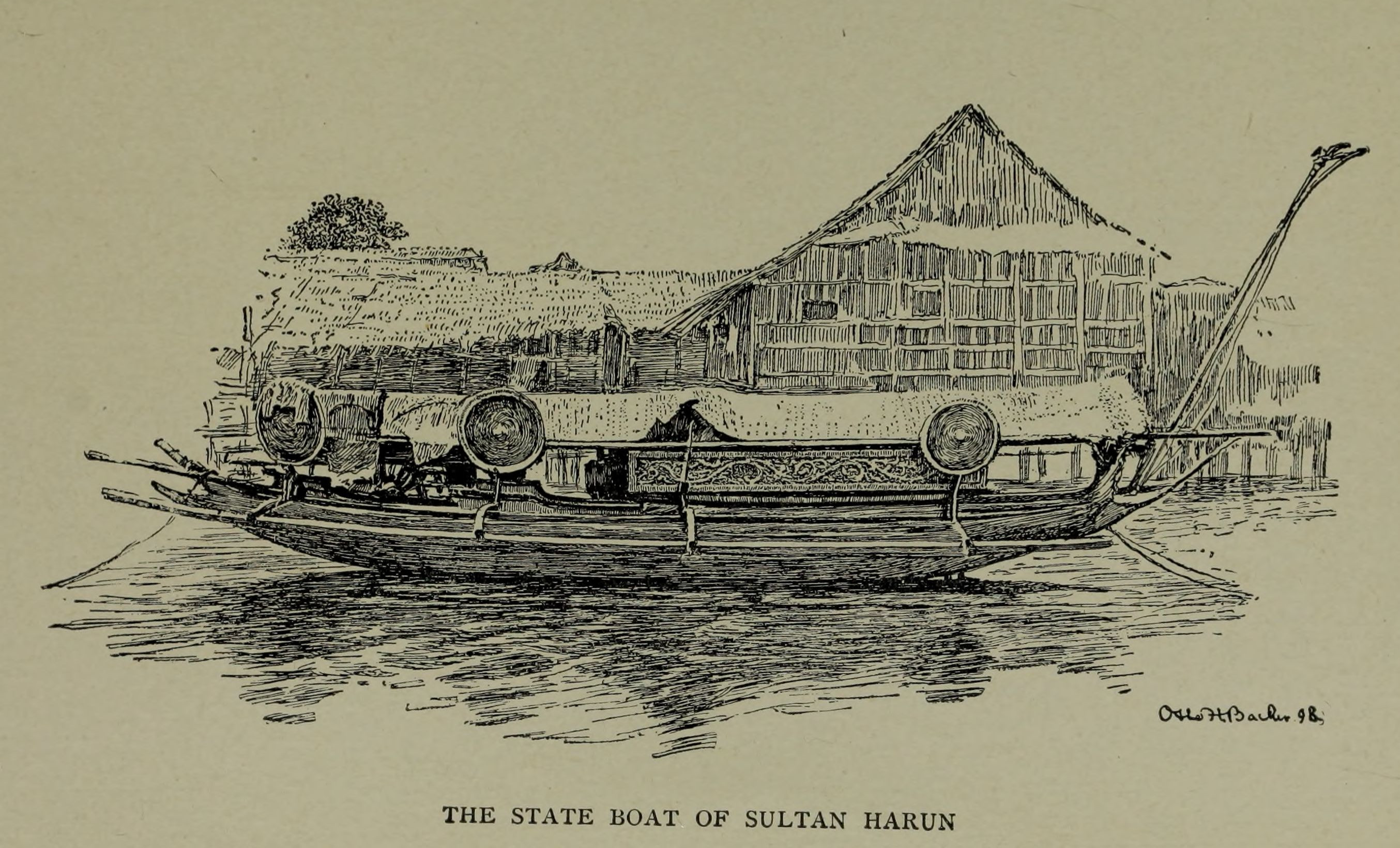
The state boat of Sultan Harun Ar-Rashid of Sulu is a large vinta (c.1898)

== See also ==
- Marina Sutil
- Londe (bininta), a related boat from the Sangir Islands
- Jukung, a similar outrigger boat from Indonesia
- Djenging
- Tempel (boat)
- Lepa (ship)
- Bigiw
- Paraw
- Outrigger canoe
- Balangay
- Sama-Bajau people
- Austronesian people
