= Garay (ship) =

Traditional Banguingui Philippine warships

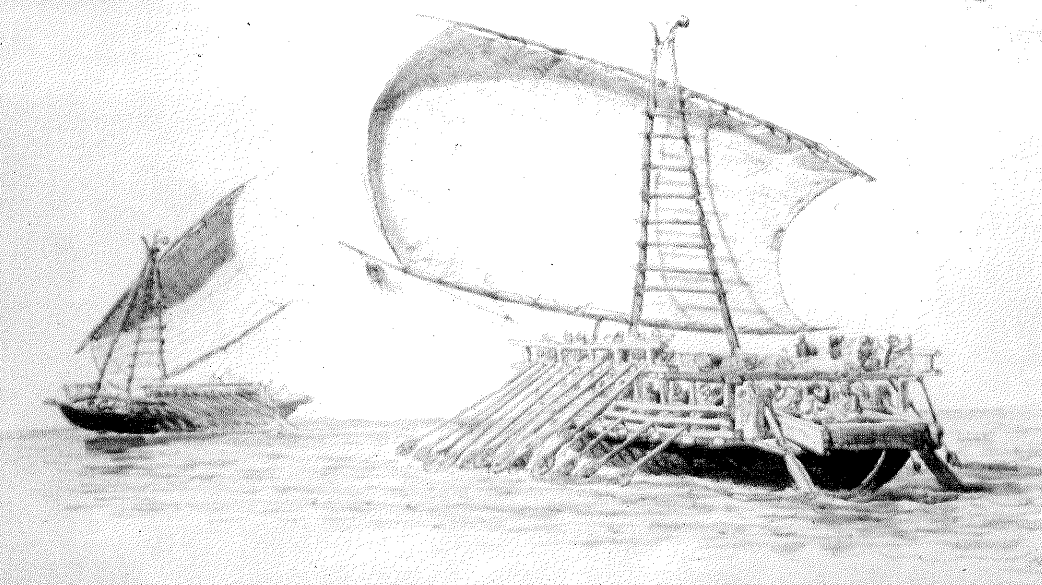
Banguingui garay ships by Rafael Monleón (1890)

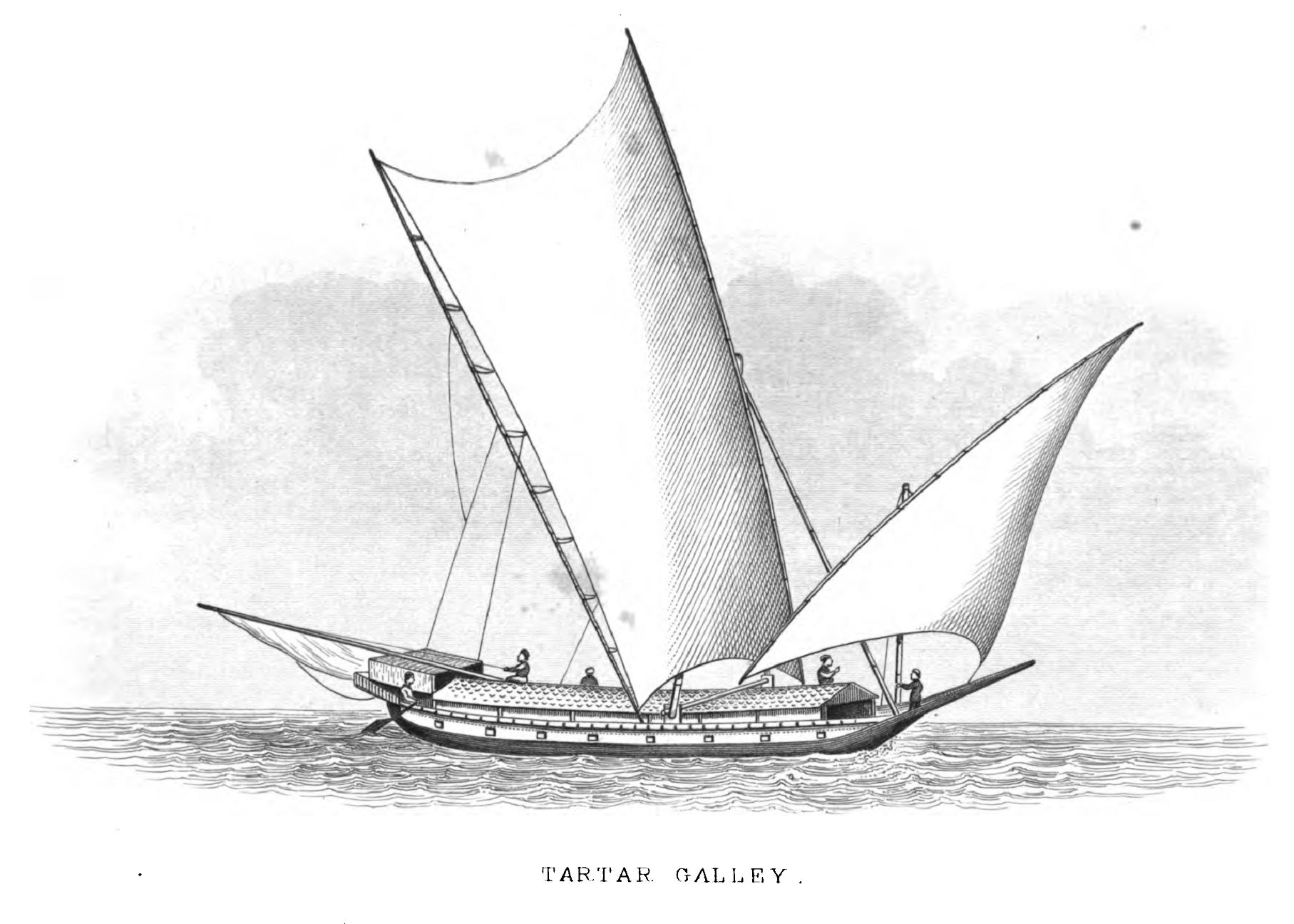
1863 illustration of the Tartar, a garay from Sulu commissioned by Thomas Forrest in his 1774 expedition to New Guinea

Garay were traditional native warships of the Banguingui people in the Philippines and were used by the Bruneian Navy. In the 18th and 19th centuries, they were commonly used for Slave Trade and Raiding Ships in the Sulu Sea by the Banguingui and Iranun people against unarmed trading ships and raids on coastal settlements in the regions surrounding the Sulu Sea and Sulu Zone

== History ==
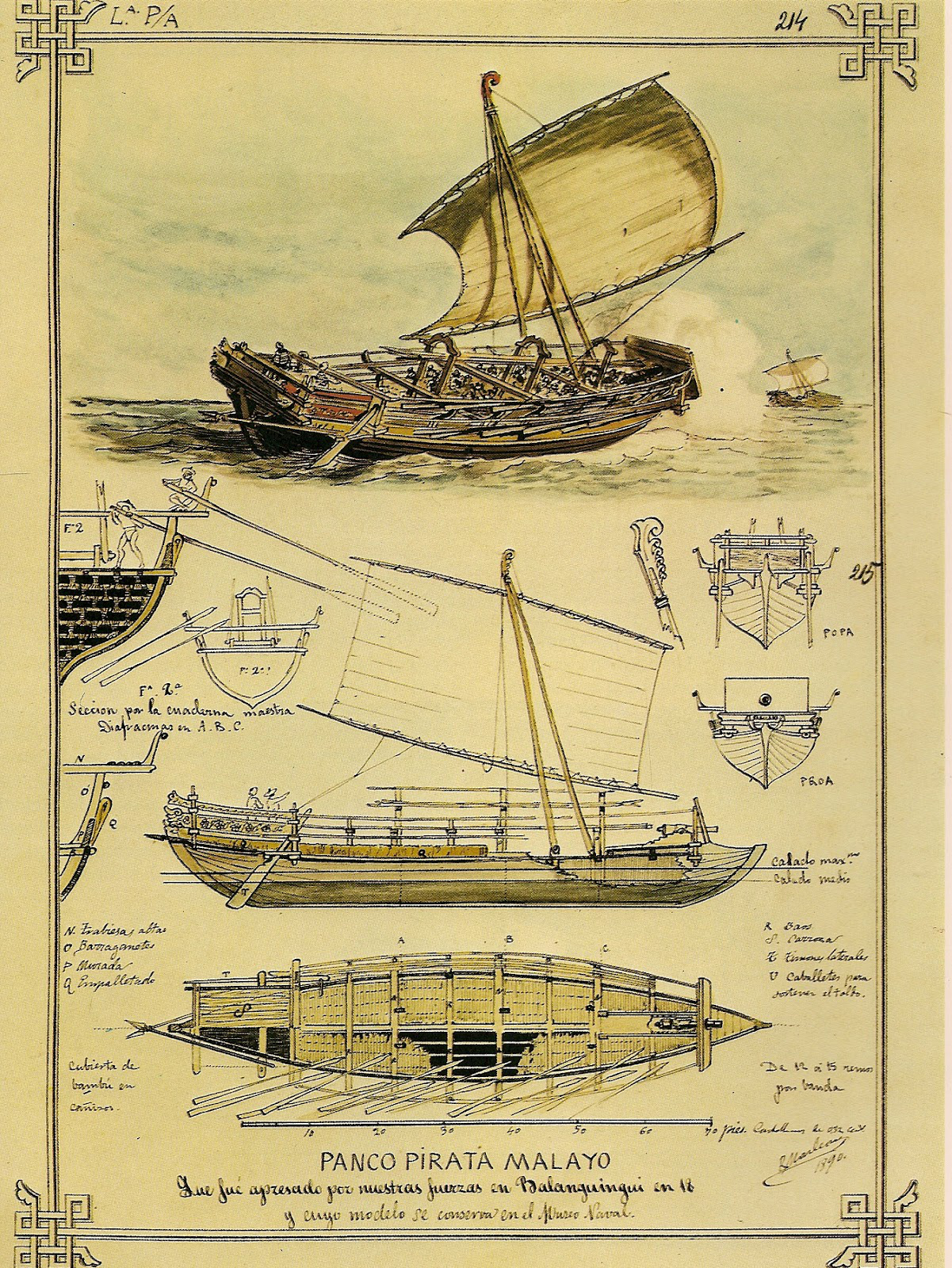
Garay illustrations by Rafael Monleón (1890)

Most garay were built in the shipyards of Parang, Sulu in the late 18th century. During the early 19th century, Banguingui garay squadrons regularly plagued the straits of southern Palawan from the months of March to November each year. They raided coastal areas in northern Borneo for slaves as well as cut off trade into the Sultanate of Brunei. These attacks severely affected the economy of Brunei, leading to its decline. The Banguingui purportedly had a saying: "It is difficult to catch fish, but easy to catch Borneans."

== Description ==
Garay were smaller, faster, and more maneuverable than the Iranun lanong warships. They had a much broader beam and a somewhat round hull with a shallow draft. They had a single tripod main-mast made of three bamboo poles, which was rigged with a large rectangular sail with tilted upper corners (a layar tanja). They also had a foremast and sometimes a mizzenmast, which were rigged with smaller triangular crab claw sails. When the wind was heavy, the mainsail was lowered and only the foresail and the mizzen sails were set.

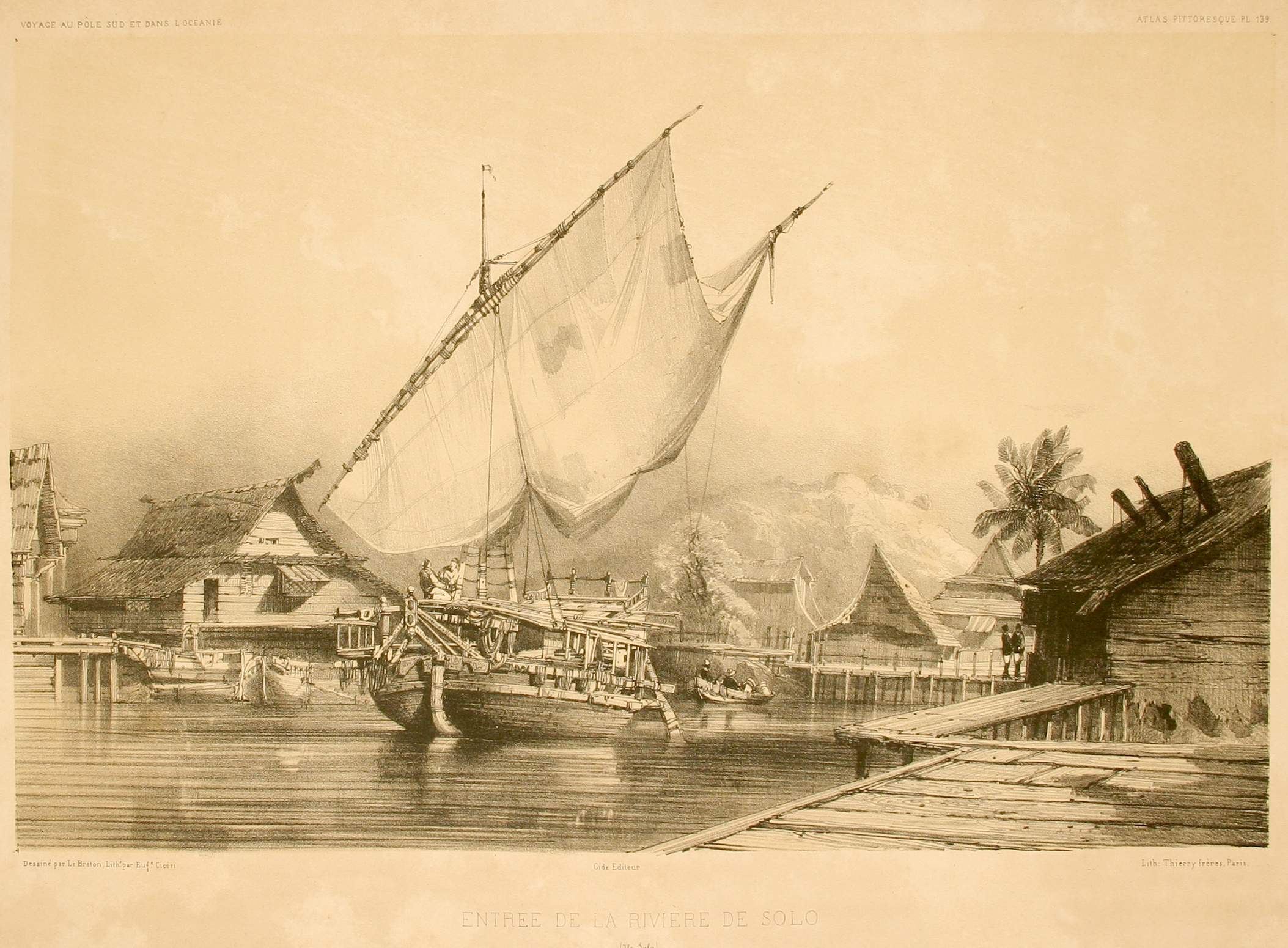
Garay anchored in Sulu, from the Voyage au Pôle Sud et dans l'Océanie sur les corvettes L'Astrolabe et La Zélée by Jules Dumont d'Urville (1846)

They were also propelled by oars. Large garay could have around 30 to 60 oars, usually arranged into two banks, one on top of the other. They were rowed by either people belonging to the alipin caste, or by captured slaves. The hull was partially or fully decked. The deck was made of split bamboo slats, divided into square sections that could be removed as required. Most of the length of the ship was covered by a house-like structure roofed with nipa leaves. A raised platform over a clay stove was used for cooking. At the sides of the hull were overhanging catwalks, about 1 to 2 ft (0.30 to 0.61 m) in width. The ship did not have a central rudder, but had two steering oars located near the stern.

The largest garay were around 70 to 80 ft (21 to 24 m) long and could carry up to 80 men, but most garay averaged at 60 to 70 ft (18 to 21 m) with around 60 men. Even smaller garay also existed with an average crew (sakay) of 25 to 30 men. Large garay can serve as motherships to smaller salisipan (a covered banca, shielded against arrows and spears), which could carry an additional 15 people.

Garay were led by a nakura or nakuda (commander) who in turn is led by a squadron leader, the panglima. The julmuri (first mate) is in charge of the crew and also controls the rudder (bausan). Another officer, the julbato stays at the prow of the ship and watches out for reefs and enemy ships. The julbato is also in charge of the anchor (sao).

Garay did not possess outriggers (unlike the lanong and other karakoa warships). Despite this fact, garay were commonly incorrectly referred to as prahu or proa (both outrigger vessels) in historical records. However, the projecting catwalks can function as a sort of outrigger in instances where the hull was flooded, keeping the ship afloat. In Malay, Javanese, and Portuguese sources, garay are also sometimes (incorrectly) referred to as penjajap. This term, however, referred specifically to penjajap (mangaio in Iranun), very long and narrow warships used mostly in Nusantara. They differed from garay in the width of their beams (penjajap were extremely narrow), and the fact that large penjajap usually had outriggers and two layar tanja sails. Garay were also sometimes referred to generically as panco (bangka).

== Role ==
Garay were lightly armed, in comparison to the lanong. They usually only had a single large cannon (lela). While the lanong specialized in ship-to-ship combat, the garay was more suited to raiding coastal villages and attacking unarmed or lightly armed trade ships.

== See also ==
- Spanish expedition to Balanguingui
- Lepa (ship)
- Balangay
- Kora kora
- History of slavery in the Muslim world
