= Austronesian vessels =

Sailing vessels of Austronesian peoples

Austronesian vessels are the traditional seafaring vessels of the Austronesian peoples of Taiwan, Maritime Southeast Asia, Micronesia, coastal New Guinea, Island Melanesia, Polynesia, and Madagascar. They also include indigenous ethnic minorities in Vietnam, Cambodia, Myanmar, Thailand, Hainan, the Comoros, and the Torres Strait Islands.

They range from small dugout canoes to large lashed-lug plank-built vessels. Their hull configurations include monohulls as well as catamarans and outrigger boats (single-outrigger boats and trimarans). Traditional sail types include a variety of distinctively Austronesian crab-claw and tanja configurations, though modern vessels are typically motorized. These vessels allowed the migrations of the Austronesian peoples during the Austronesian expansion (starting at around 3000 to 1500 BC from Taiwan and Island Southeast Asia) throughout the islands of the Indo-Pacific, reaching as far as Madagascar, New Zealand, and Easter Island. They were also used to establish trading routes, including the Austronesian maritime trade network which formed the maritime leg of the spice trade and later, the Maritime Silk Road.

== History ==
Map showing the migration and expansion of the Austronesians which began at about 3000 BC from Taiwan

Austronesians used distinctive sailing technologies, namely the catamaran, the outrigger ship, tanja sail and the crab claw sail. This allowed them to colonize a large part of the Indo-Pacific region during the Austronesian expansion starting at around 3000 to 1500 BC, and ending with the colonization of Easter Island and New Zealand in the 10th to 13th centuries AD. Prior to the 16th century Colonial Era, Austronesians were the most widespread ethnolinguistic group, spanning half the planet from Easter Island in the eastern Pacific Ocean to Madagascar in the western Indian Ocean. They also established vast maritime trading networks, among which is the Neolithic precursor to what would become the Maritime Silk Road.

The simplest form of all ancestral Austronesian boats had five parts. The bottom part consists of a single piece of hollowed-out log. At the sides were two planks, and two horseshoe-shaped wood pieces formed the prow and stern. These were fitted tightly together edge-to-edge by sewing or with dowels inserted into holes in between, and then lashed to each other with ropes (made from rattan or fibre) wrapped around protruding lugs on the planks. This characteristic and ancient Austronesian boatbuilding practice is known as the "lashed-lug" technique. They were commonly caulked with pastes made from various plants as well as tapa bark and fibres which would expand when wet, further tightening joints and making the hull watertight. They formed the shell of the boat, which was then reinforced by horizontal ribs. Shipwrecks of Austronesian ships can be identified from this construction, as well as the absence of metal nails. Austronesian ships traditionally had no central rudders but were instead steered using an oar on one side.

They also independently developed various sail types during the Neolithic, beginning with the crab claw sail (more usually called the "oceanic lateen" or the "oceanic sprit") at around 1500 BCE. They are used throughout the range of the Austronesian Expansion, from Maritime Southeast Asia, to Micronesia, Island Melanesia, Polynesia, and Madagascar. Crab claw sails are rigged fore-and-aft and can be tilted and rotated relative to the wind. They evolved from V-shaped perpendicular square sails in which the two spars converge at the base of the hull. The simplest form of the crab claw sail (also with the widest distribution) is composed of a triangular sail supported by two light spars (sometimes erroneously called "sprits") on each side. They were originally mastless, and the entire assembly was taken down when the sails were lowered.

== Hull and sail configurations ==
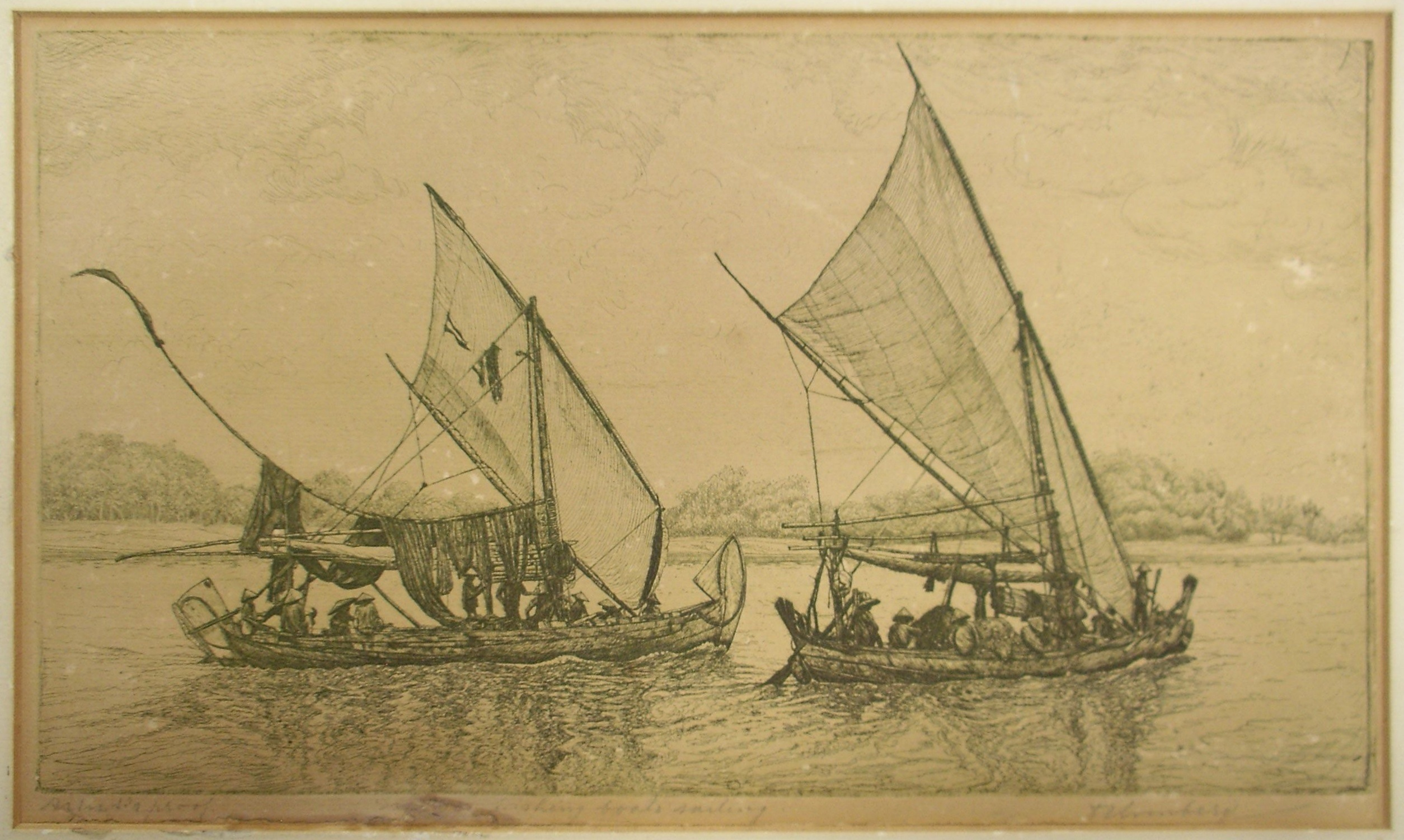
Both crab claw and tanja sails used by Javanese fishing boats (c. 1920)

Austronesian rigs were used for double-canoe (catamaran), single-outrigger (on the windward side), or double-outrigger boat configurations, in addition to monohulls.

=== Crab claw ===
There are several distinct types of crab claw rigs, but unlike western rigs, they do not have fixed conventional names. Crab claw sails are rigged fore-and-aft and can be tilted and rotated relative to the wind. They evolved from V-shaped perpendicular square sails in which the two spars converge at the base of the hull. The simplest form of the crab claw sail (also with the widest distribution) is composed of a triangular sail supported by two light spars (sometimes erroneously called "sprits") on each side. They were originally mastless, and the entire assembly was taken down when the sails were lowered.

Shunting technique on a single-outrigger double-ended kaep from Palau. The entire rig is moved to the other end of the boat, and the prow becomes the stern and vice versa

The need to propel larger and more heavily laden boats led to the increase in vertical sail. However this introduced more instability to the vessels. In addition to the unique invention of outriggers to solve this, the sails were also leaned backwards and the converging point moved further forward on the hull. This new configuration required a loose "prop" in the middle of the hull to hold the spars up, as well as rope supports on the windward side. This allowed more sail area (and thus more power) while keeping the center of effort low and thus making the boats more stable. The prop was later converted into fixed or removable canted masts where the spars of the sails were actually suspended by a halyard from the masthead. This type of sail is most refined in Micronesian proas which could reach very high speeds. These configurations are sometimes known as the "crane sprit" or the "crane spritsail".

Micronesian, Island Melanesian, and Polynesian single-outrigger vessels also used the canted mast configuration to uniquely develop shunting. In shunting vessels, both ends are alike, and the boat is sailed in either direction, but it has a fixed leeward side and a windward side. The boat is shunted from beam reach to beam reach to change direction, with the wind over the side, a low-force procedure. The bottom corner of the crab claw sail is moved to the other end, which becomes the bow as the boat sets off back the way it came. The mast usually hinges, adjusting the rake or angle of the mast. The crab claw configuration used on these vessels is a low-stress rig, which can be built with simple tools and low-tech materials, but it is extremely fast. On a beam reach, it may be the fastest simple rig.

Another evolution of the basic crab claw sail is the conversion of the upper spar into a fixed mast. In Polynesia, this gave the sail more height while also making it narrower, giving it a shape reminiscent of crab pincers (hence "crab claw" sail). This was also usually accompanied by the lower spar becoming more curved.

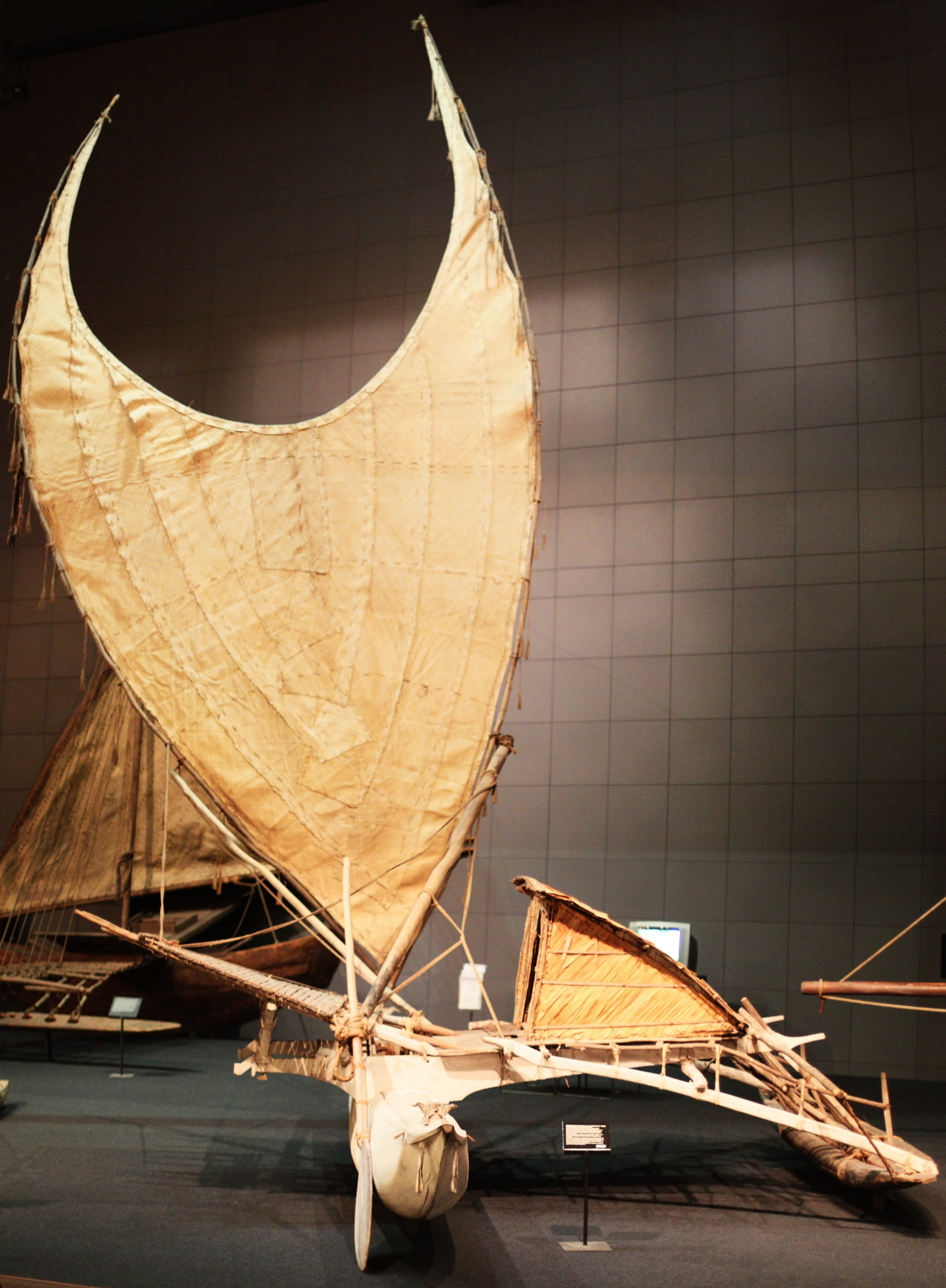
Taumako single-outrigger tepukei, an example of the basic mastless crab claw sail

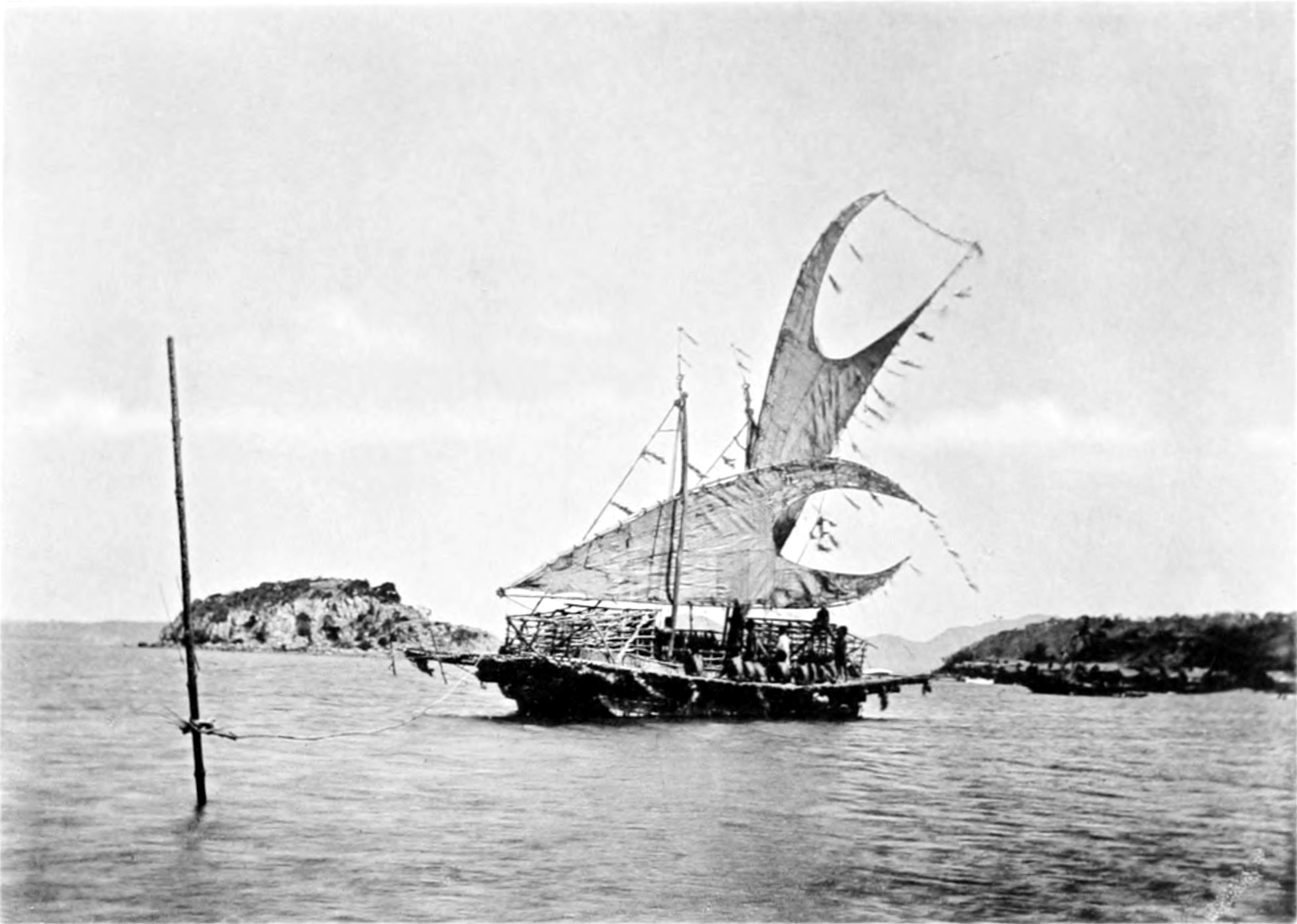
Motuan catamaran lakatoi with crab claw sails on fixed masts

Visayan double-outrigger paraw with a "crane sprit" crab claw sail and a jib

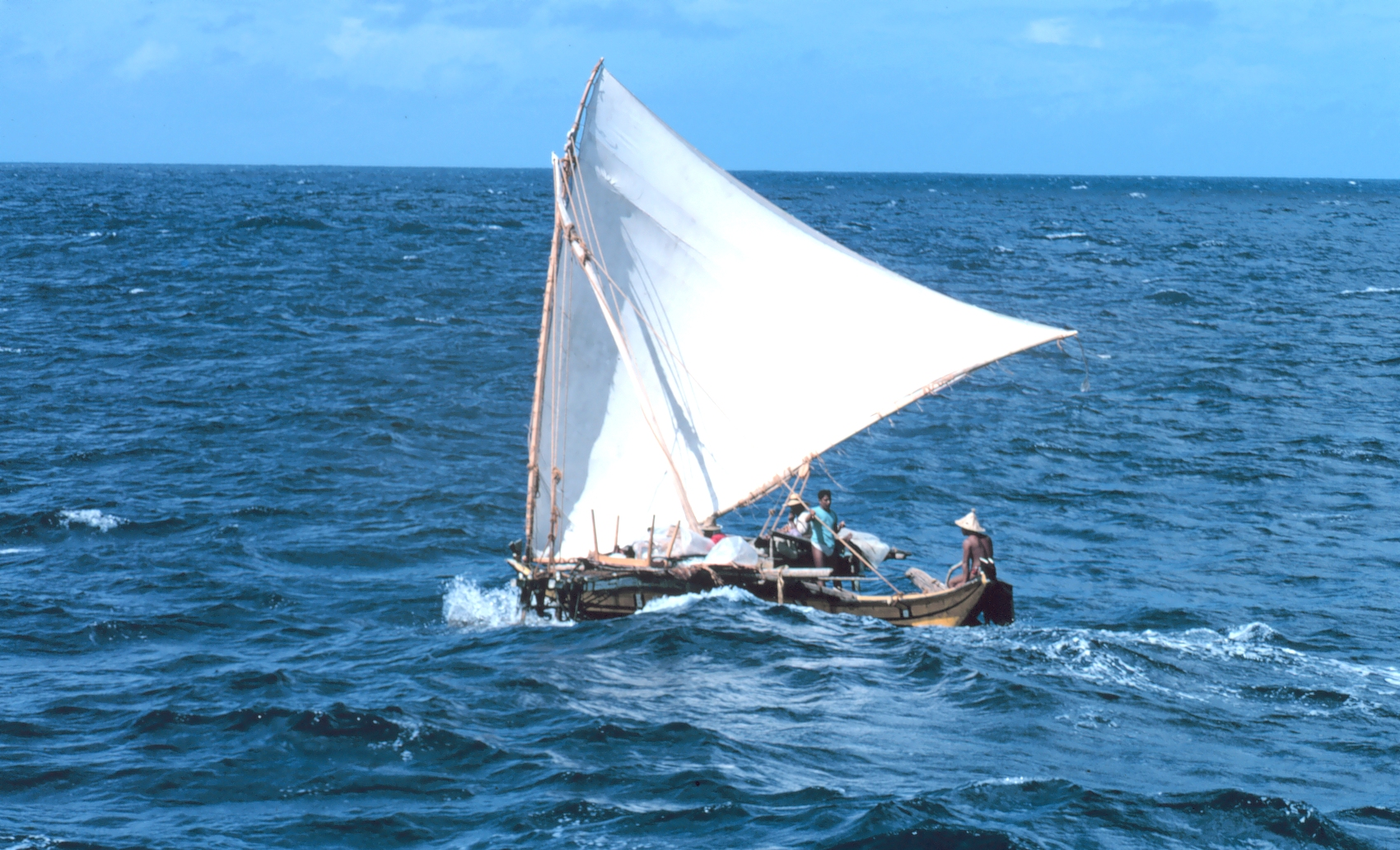
Carolinian single-outrigger shunting wa with a "crane sprit" crab claw sail on a canted mast

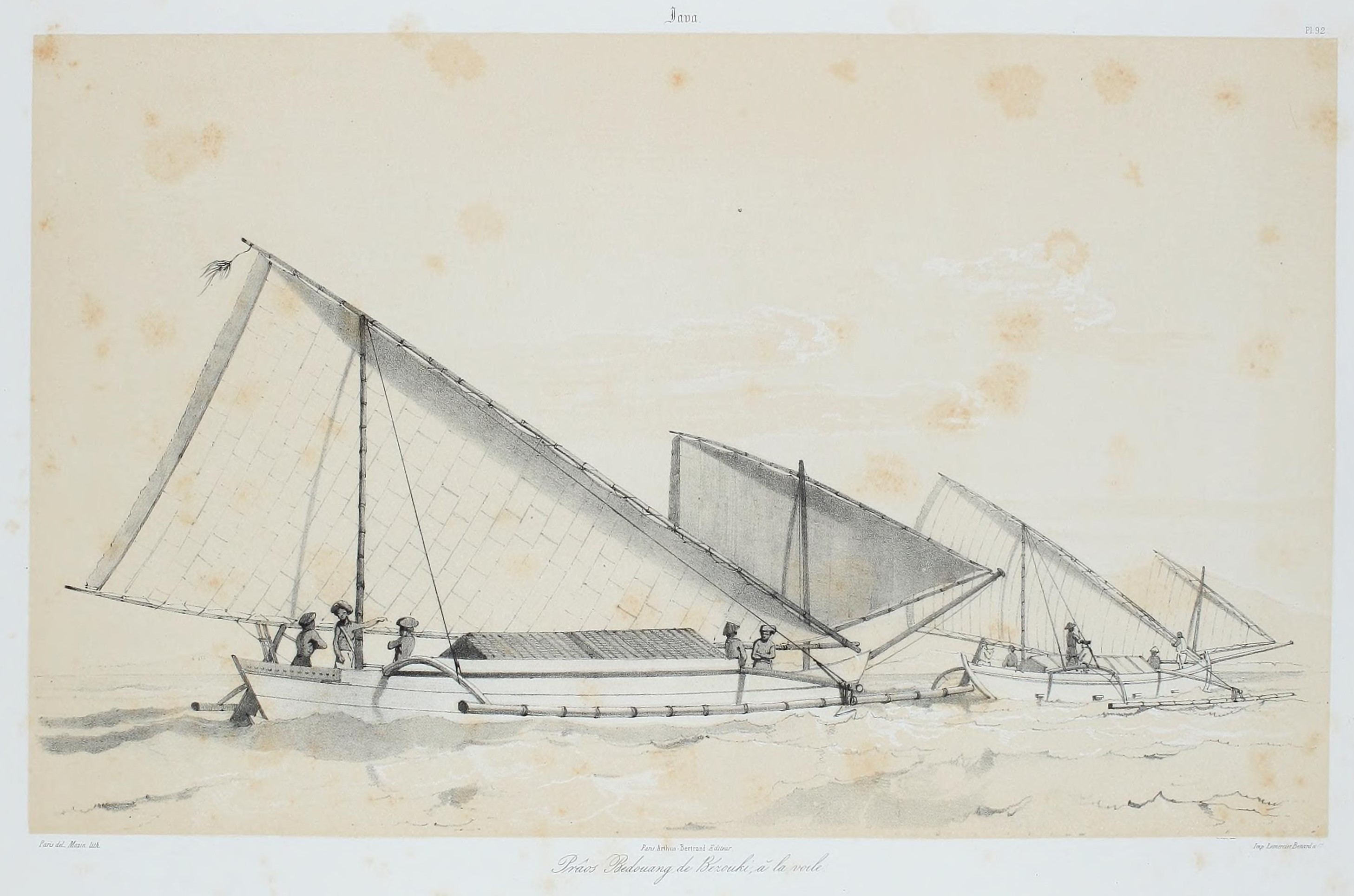
Madurese paduwang with crab claw sails on fixed masts

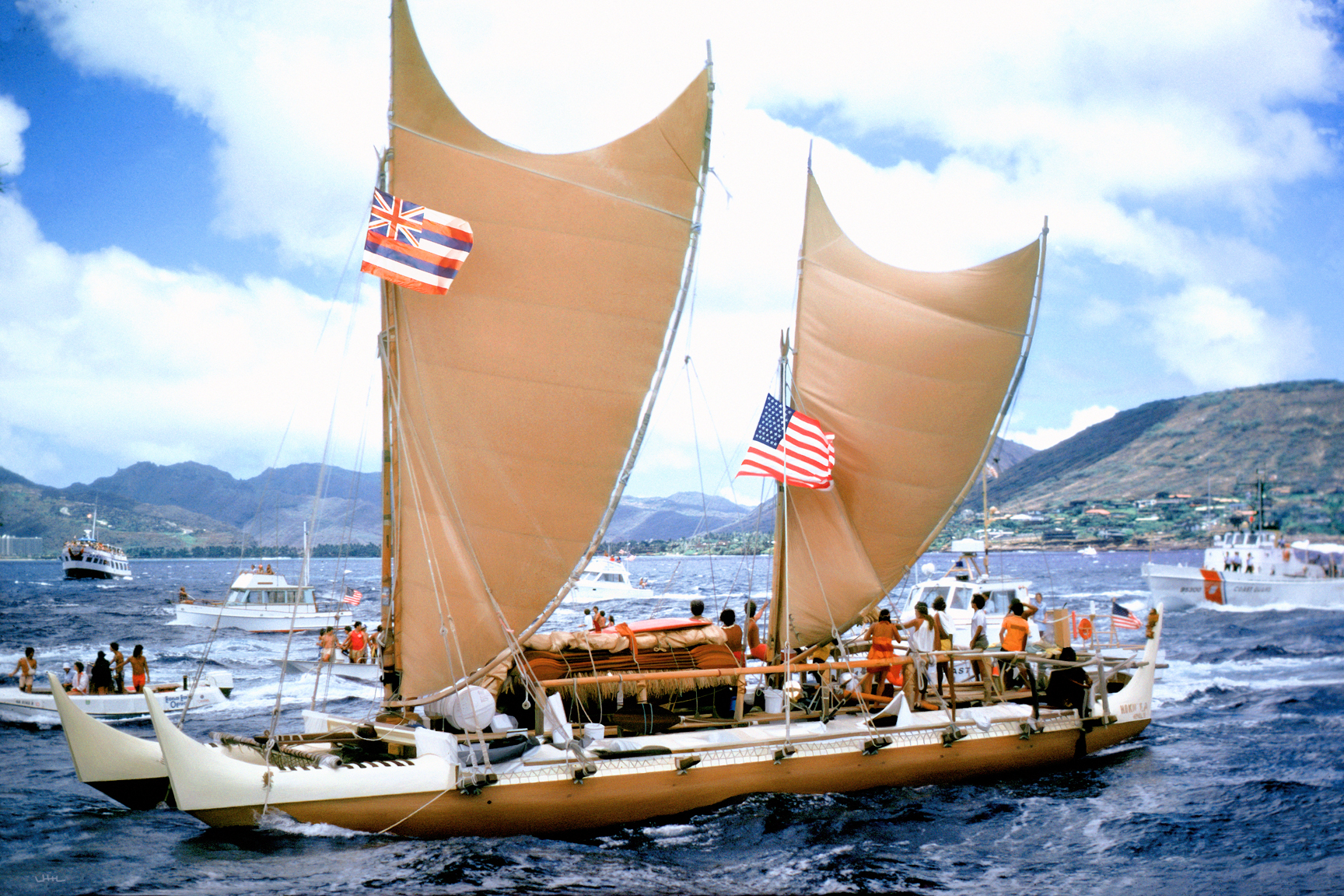
Hokule'a, a fibreglass replica of a Hawaiian catamaran waʻa kaulua, with curved-spar, curved-leech crab claw sails
Melanesian V-shaped square sail

New Zealand V-shaped square sail

Polynesian crab claw sail

New Guinea crab claw sail

Hawaiian crab claw sail with the upper spar merged with the fixed mast

=== Tanja ===
The conversion of the prop to a fixed mast in the crab claw sail led to the much later invention of the tanja sail (also known variously and misleadingly as the canted square sail, canted rectangular sail, boomed lugsail, or balance lugsail). Tanja sails were rigged similarly to crab claw sails and also had spars on both the head and the foot of the sails; but they were square or rectangular with the spars not converging into a point. They are generally mounted on one or two (rarely three or more) bipod or tripod masts, usually made from thick bamboo. The masts have curved heads with grooves for attaching the halyards. The lower part of two of the bamboo poles of the mast assembly have holes that are fitted unto the ends of a cross-wise length of timber on the deck, functioning like a hinge. The forward part of the mast assembly had a forelock. By unlocking it, the mast can be lowered across the ship.

Despite the similarity of its appearance to western square rigs, the tanja is a fore-and-aft rig similar to a lugsail. The sail was suspended from the upper spar ("yard"), while the lower spar functioned like a boom. When set fore-and-aft, the spars extend forward of the mast by about a third of their lengths. When running before the wind, they are set perpendicular to the hull, similar to a square rig. The sail can be rotated around the mast (lessening the need for steering with the rudders) and tilted to move the center of pull forward or aft. The sail can even be tilted completely horizontally, becoming wing-like, to lift the bow above incoming waves. The sail is reefed by rolling it around the lower spar.

In addition to the tanja sails, ships with the tanja rigs also have bowsprits set with a quadrilateral headsail, sometimes also canted as depicted in the Borobudur ships. In the colonial era, these were replaced by triangular western-style jibs (often several in later periods), and the tanja sails themselves were slowly replaced with western rigs like gaff rigs.

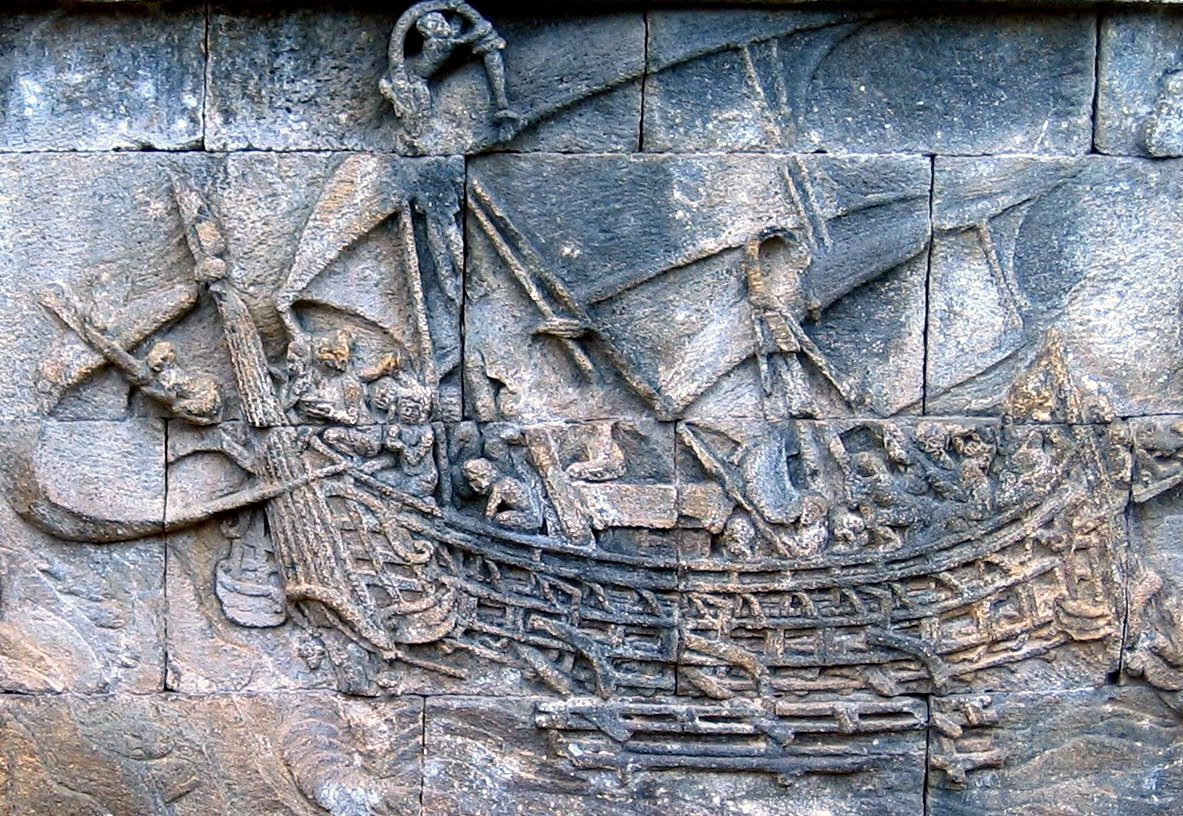
One of the ships in Borobudur depicting a double-outrigger vessel with tanja sails in bas-relief (c. 8th–9th century)

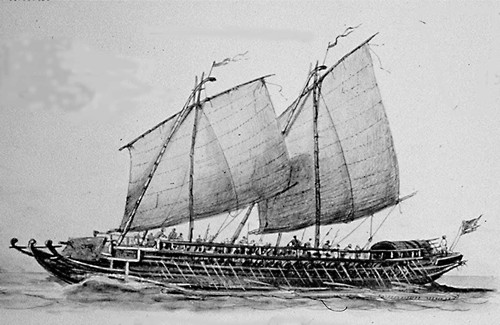
Iranun double-outrigger lanong with tanja sails on removable bipod masts

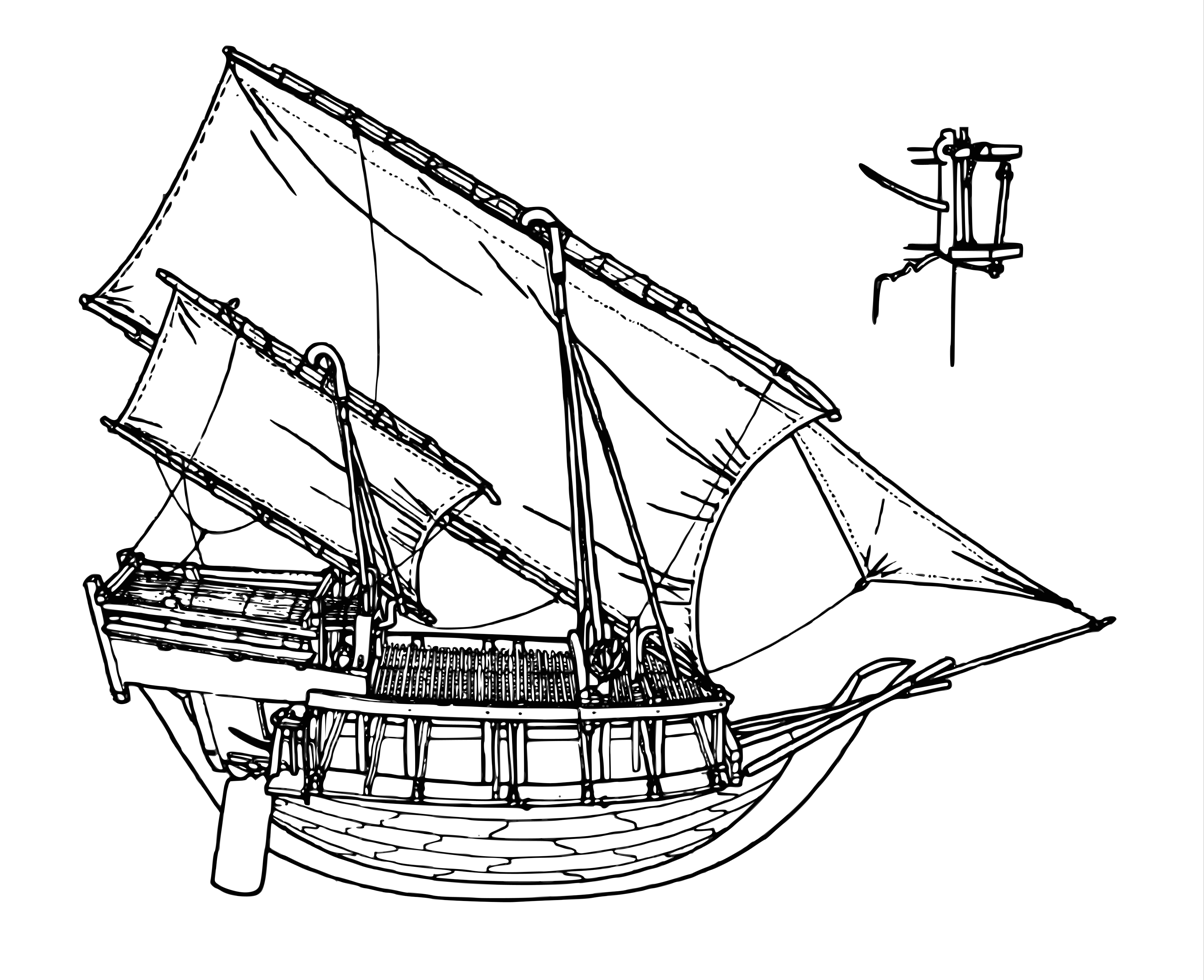
Makassar benawa with tanja sails on removable tripod masts and a jib

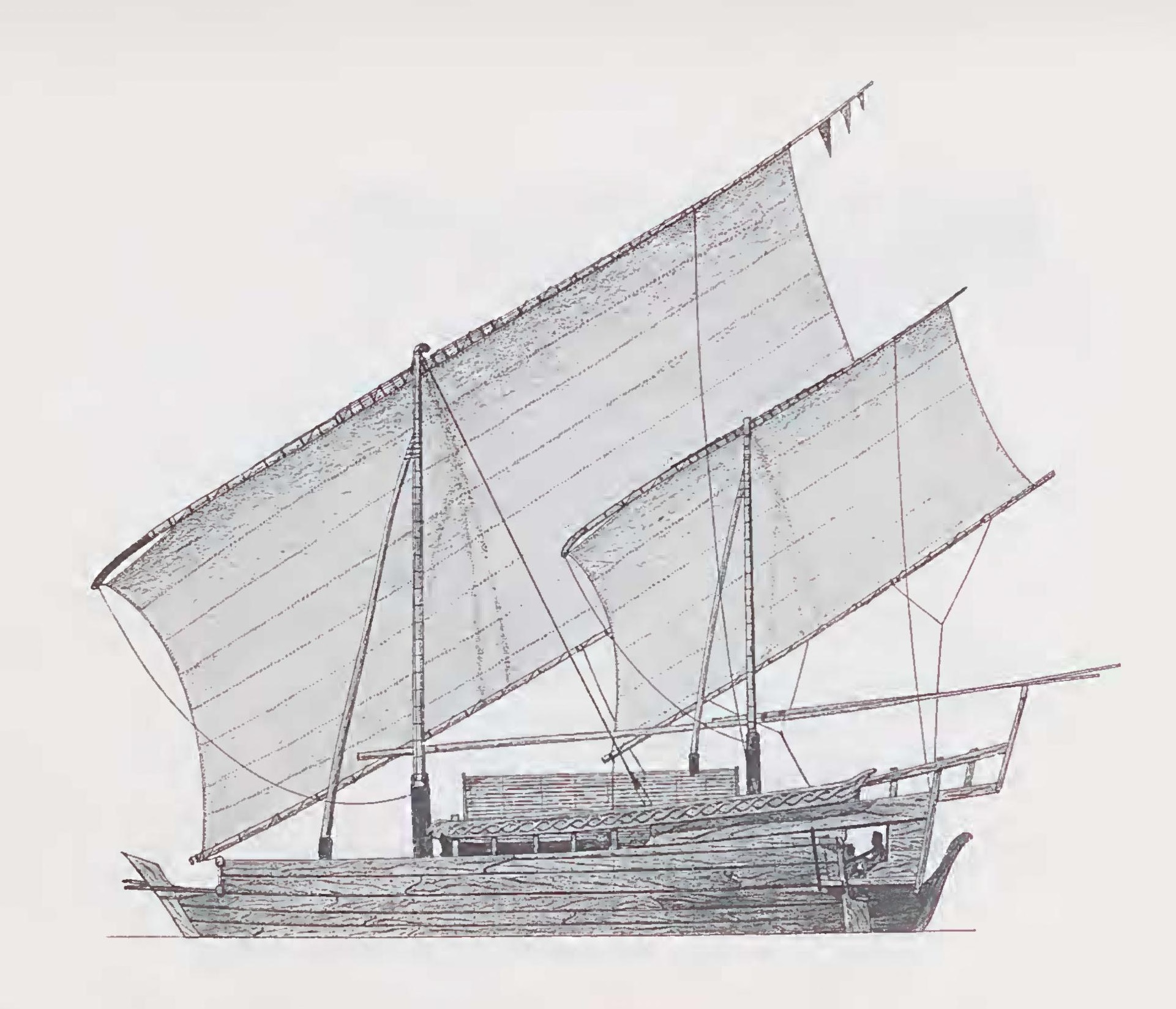
Makassar padewakang with tanja sails on bipod masts

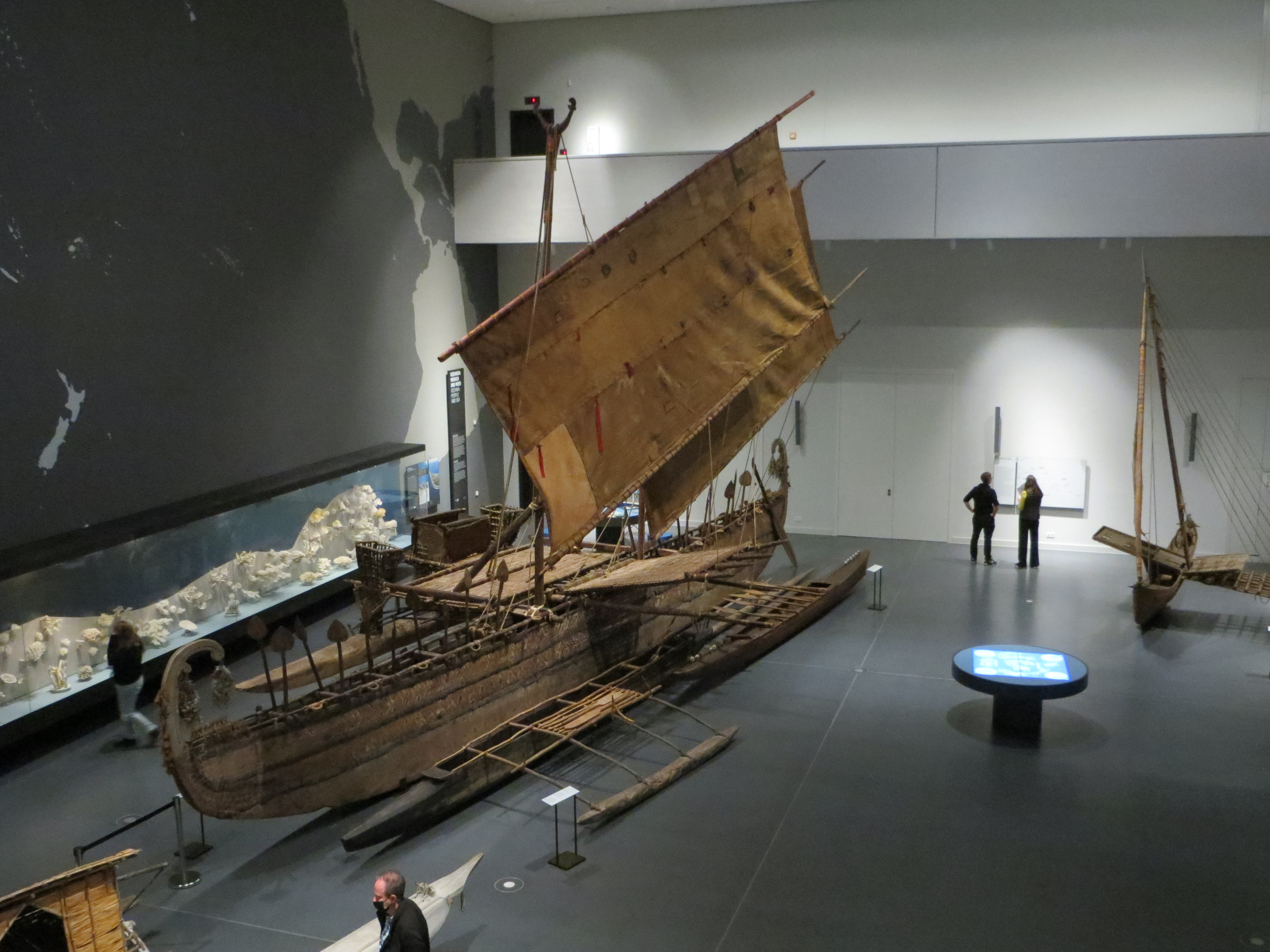
Micronesian catamaran with tanja sails from Luf Island, Hermit Islands, Bismarck Archipelago

== List of Austronesian vessels by region ==
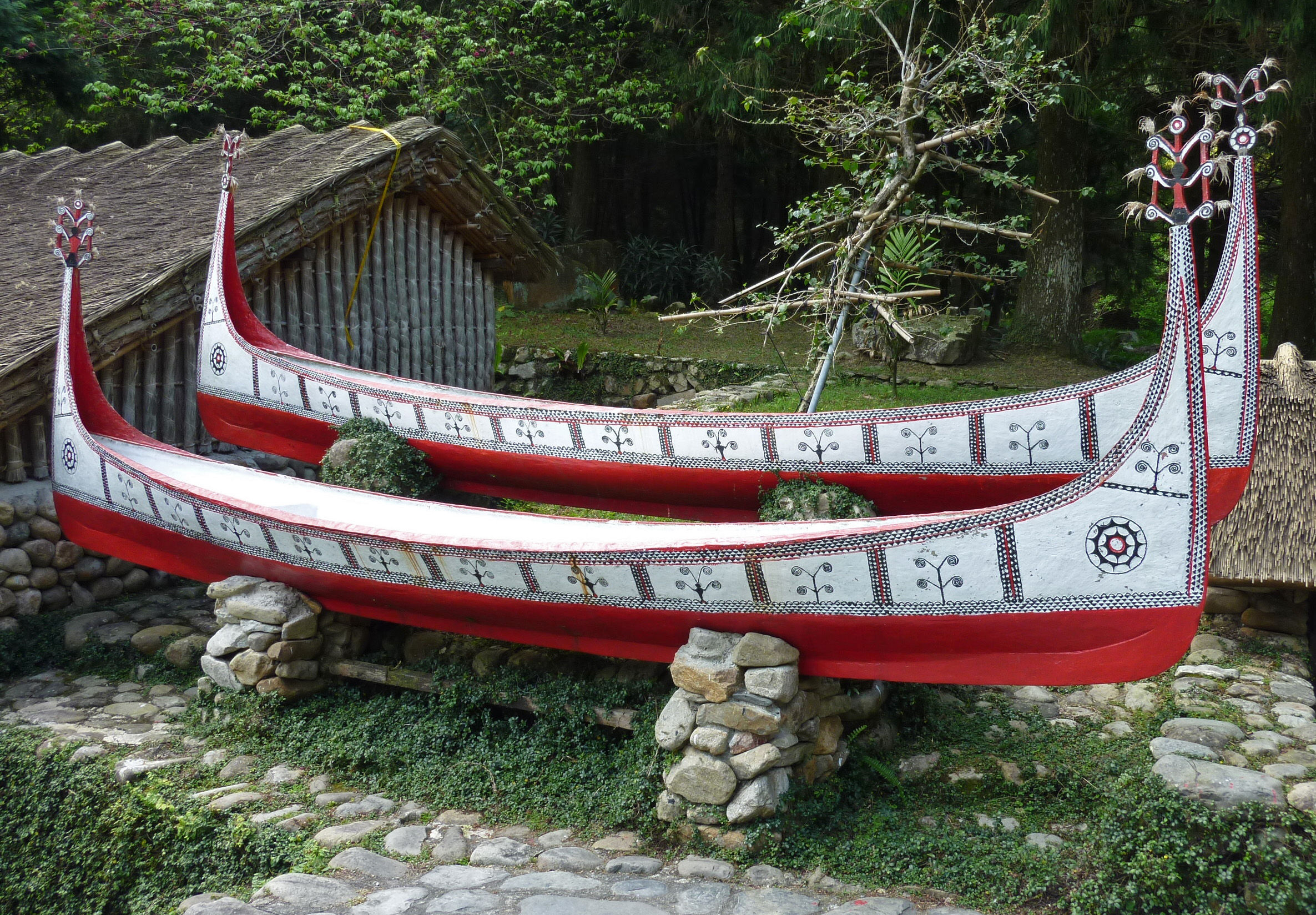
Ipanitika of the Tao people of Taiwan

The following is an incomplete list of traditional Austronesian vessels.

=== Taiwan ===
==== Orchid Island ====
- Ipanitika
- Tatara

=== Island Southeast Asia ===
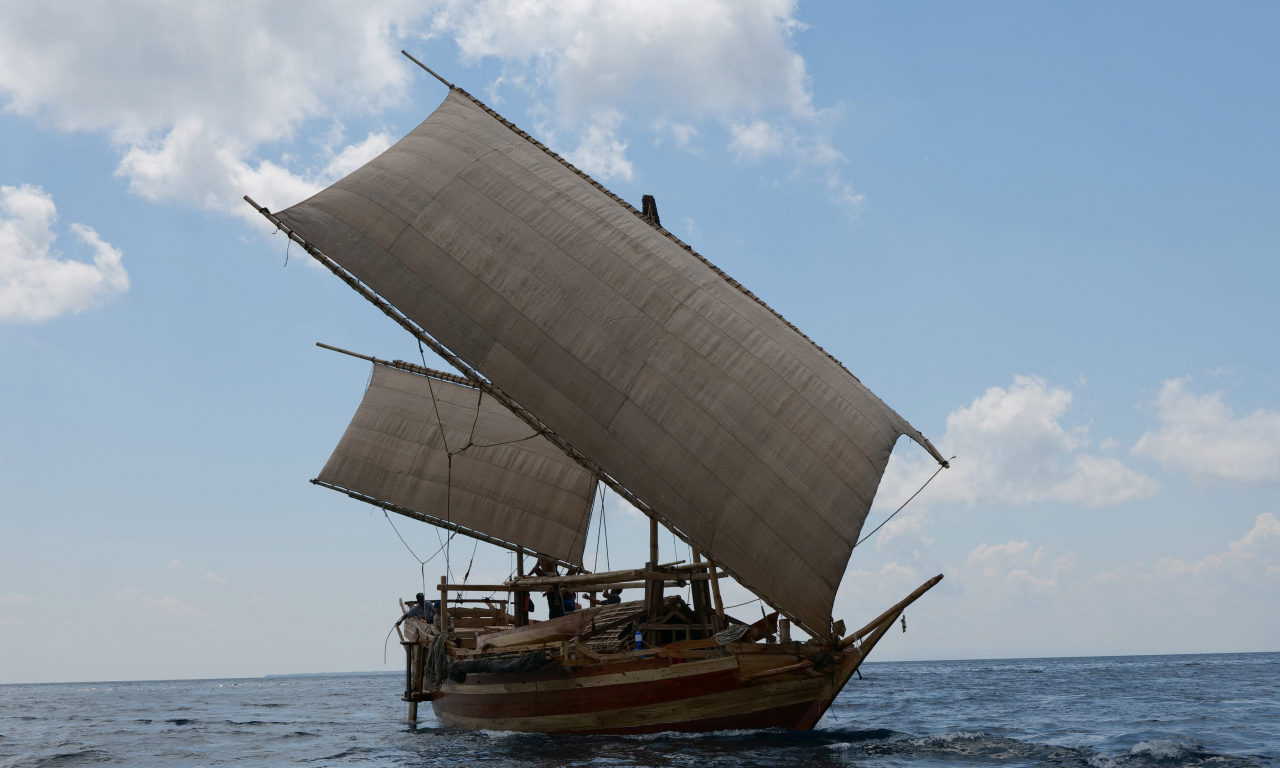
The Kapal Nur Al Marege, a Makassar padewakang from Indonesia

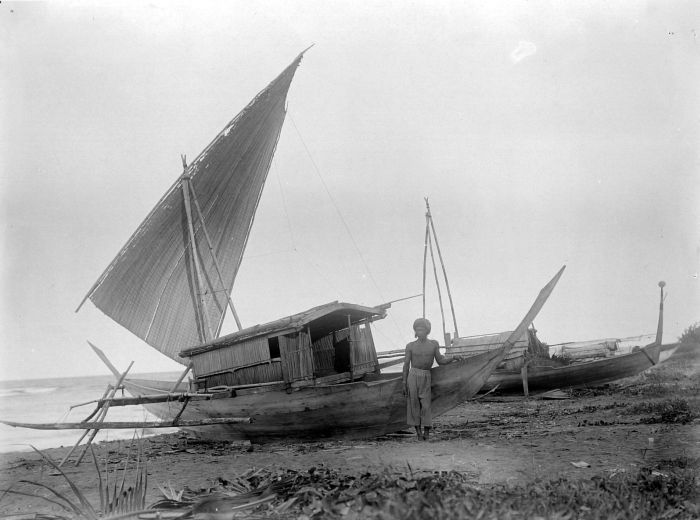
A kora-kora from Halmahera, Maluku Islands, Indonesia (c. 1920)

==== Brunei ====
- Bajak
- Bangkong
- Gubang
- Jong
- Kakap
- Penjajap
- Tongkang

==== Indonesia ====
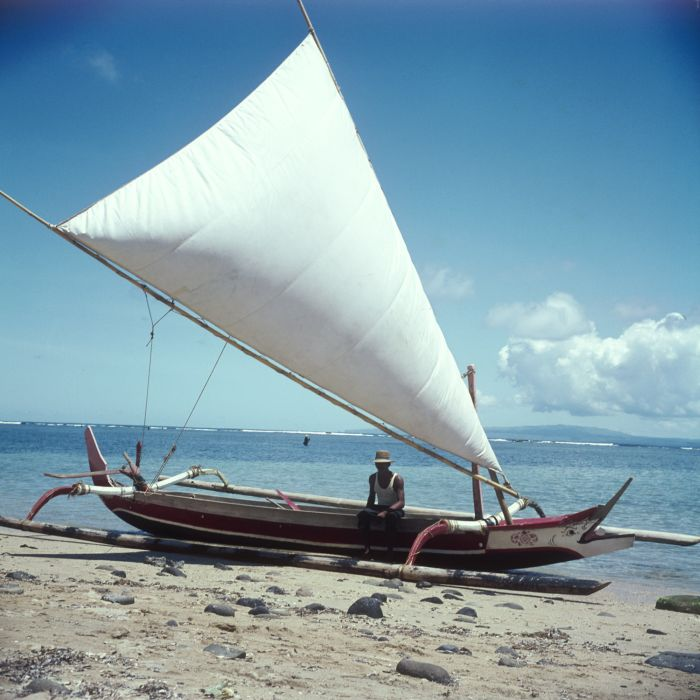
A jukung from Indonesia

- Abak
- Bagan
- Bago
- Bajak
- Bangkong
- Banting
- Benawa
- Borobudur ship
- Cerucuh
- Chialoup
- Eloha
- Fakatora
- Ghali
- Ghurab
- Golekan
- Janggolan
- Jellore
- Jong
- Jongkong
- Juanga
- Jukung
- Jukung tambangan
- Kakap
- Kalulis
- Kelulus
- Kolay
- Kolekole
- Knabat bogolu
- Kora kora
- Kotta mara
- K'un-lun po
- Lancang
- Lancaran
- Lepa
- Lepa-Lepa
- Leti leti
- Lis-alis
- Londe
- Malangbang
- Mayang
- Orembai
- Padewakang
- Paduwang
- Pajala
- Paledang
- Penjajap
- Pangkur
- Patorani
- Pelang
- Pencalang
- Perahu
- Pinisi (Lambo, Palari)
- Sampan panjang
- Sandeq
- Sarua
- Sekong
- Solu
- Teneh
- Tongkang
- Toop

==== Malaysia ====
- Bajak
- Bangkong
- Banting
- Bedar
- Buggoh
- Birau
- Cerucuh
- Ghali
- Ghurab
- Jong
- Juanga
- Kakap
- Kolek
- Lancang
- Lancaran
- Lepa
- Pelang
- Pencalang
- Penjajap
- Perahu payang
- Perahu tambangan
- Pinas
- Sampan panjang
- Tongkang

==== Philippines ====
The double-outrigger paraw in Boracay, Philippines

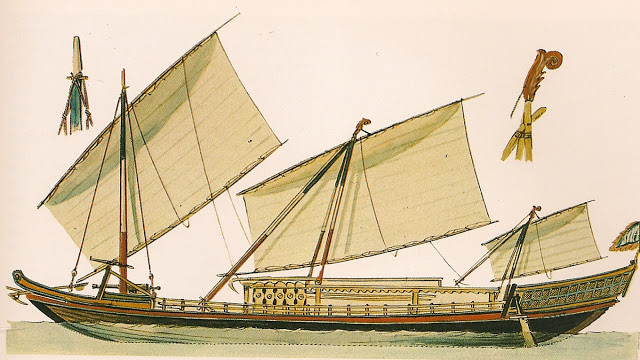
An Iranun lanong warship from the Philippines

- Armadahan
- Avang
- Awang
- Balación
- Balangay (Barangay)
- Baloto
- Bangka
- Bangka anak-anak
- Basnigan
- Batil
- Bigiw
- Bilo
- Birau
- Biray
- Biroko (Birok, Bidok)
- Buggoh
- Casco
- Chinarem
- Chinedkeran
- Dinahit
- Djenging (Balutu)
- Falua
- Garay
- Guilalo
- Juanga
- Junkun
- Junkung
- Karakoa
- Kulibo
- Lanong
- Lapis
- Lepa (Kumpit, Pidlas)
- Ontang
- Owong
- Panineman
- Pasaplap
- Pangayaw
- Paraw
- Salambaw
- Salisipan
- Sapyaw
- Seberen
- Tapake
- Tataya
- Tempel
- Tilimbao (Tinimbao)
- Tiririt (Buti)
- Vinta (Dapang, Pilang)

==== Singapore ====
- Sampan panjang
- Tongkang

=== Micronesia ===
A single-outrigger wa from Yap, Caroline Islands

==== Caroline Islands ====
- Wa
- Wahr
- Waserak

==== Kiribati ====
- Baurua

==== Marshall Islands ====
- Korkor
- Tipnol
- Walap

==== Mariana Islands, incl. Guam ====
- Ladjak
- Sakman (Flying proa)

==== Palau ====
- Kaep
- Wa

==== Yap ====
- Chugpin
- Popow
- Wa

=== Island Melanesia ===
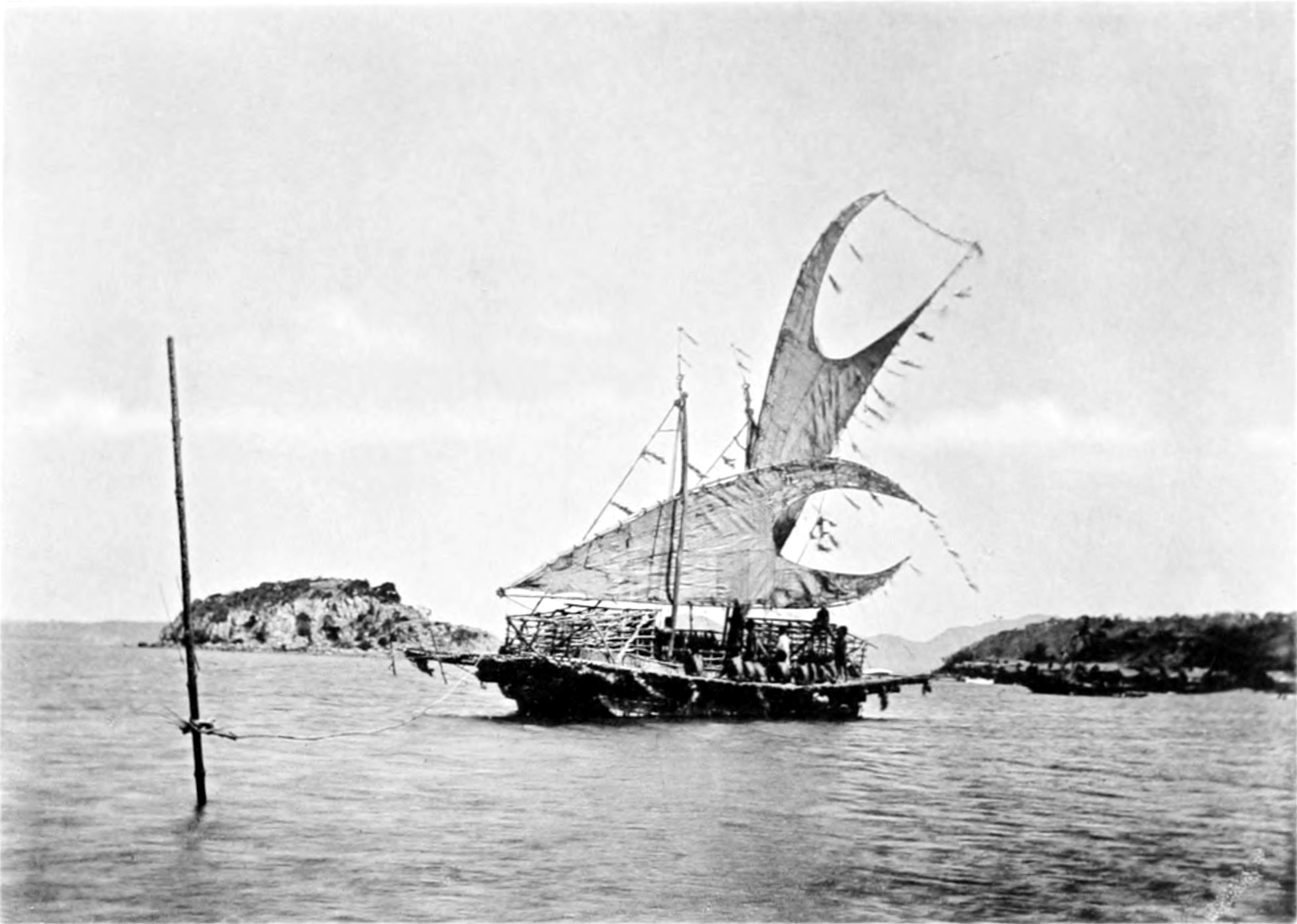
Lakatoi of the Motu people of Papua New Guinea

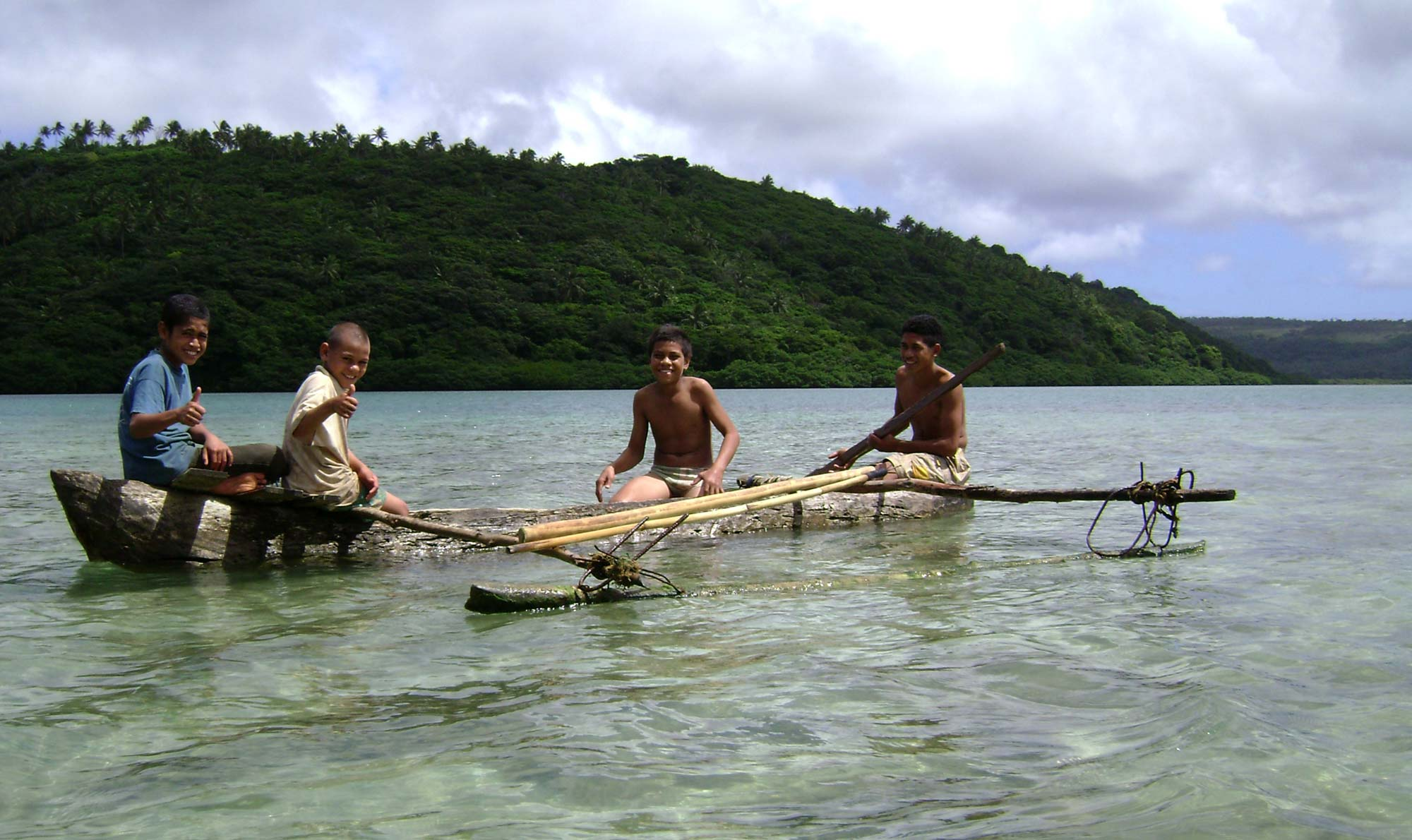
The traditional pōpao of Tonga

==== Fiji ====
- Camakau
- Drua (Wangga tabu)
- Takia

==== Papua New Guinea ====
- Lakatoi

==== Solomon Islands ====
- Tepukei

==== Vanuatu ====
- Aka
- Angga
- Wangga

=== Polynesia ===
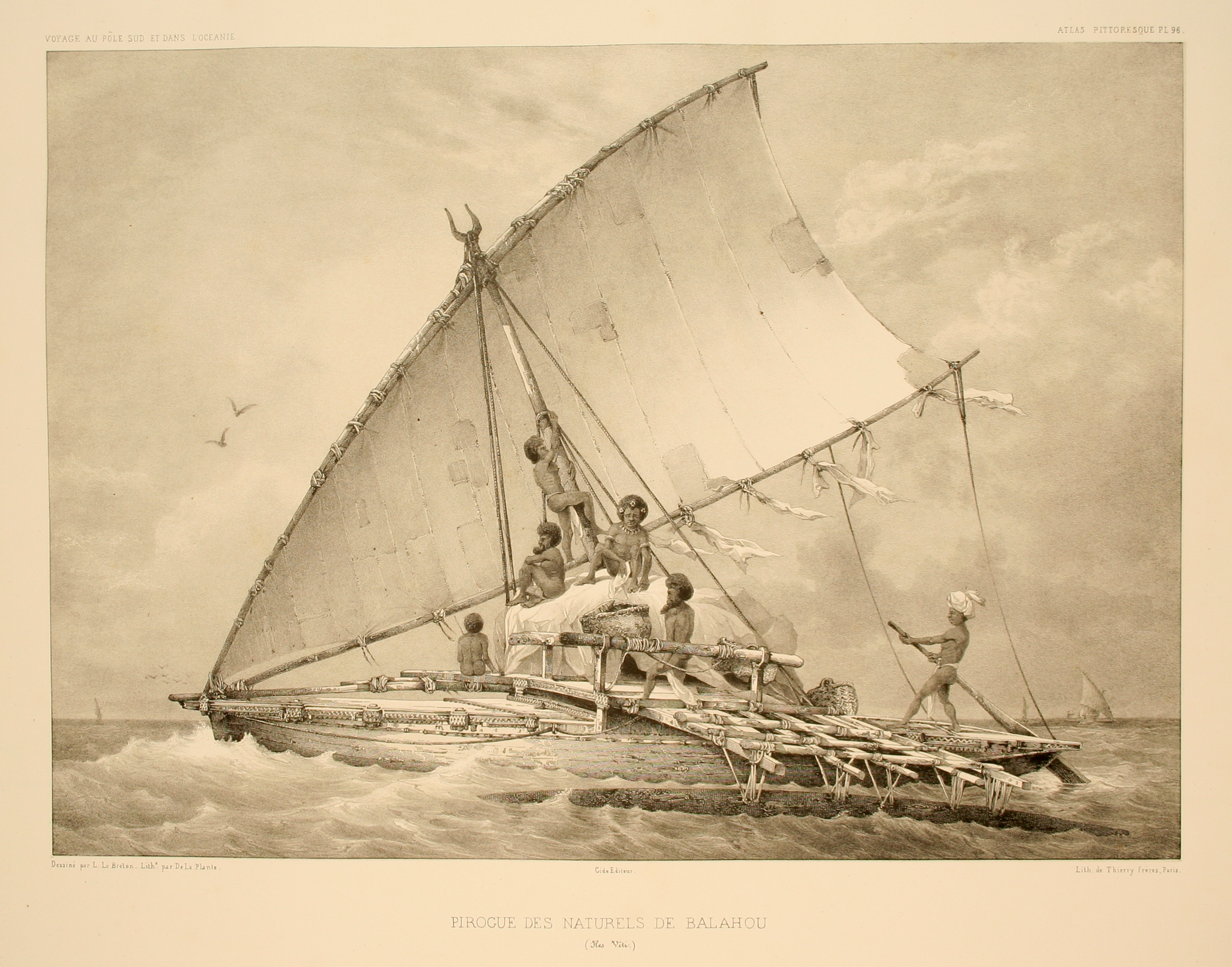
Illustration of a Fijian camakau (1846)

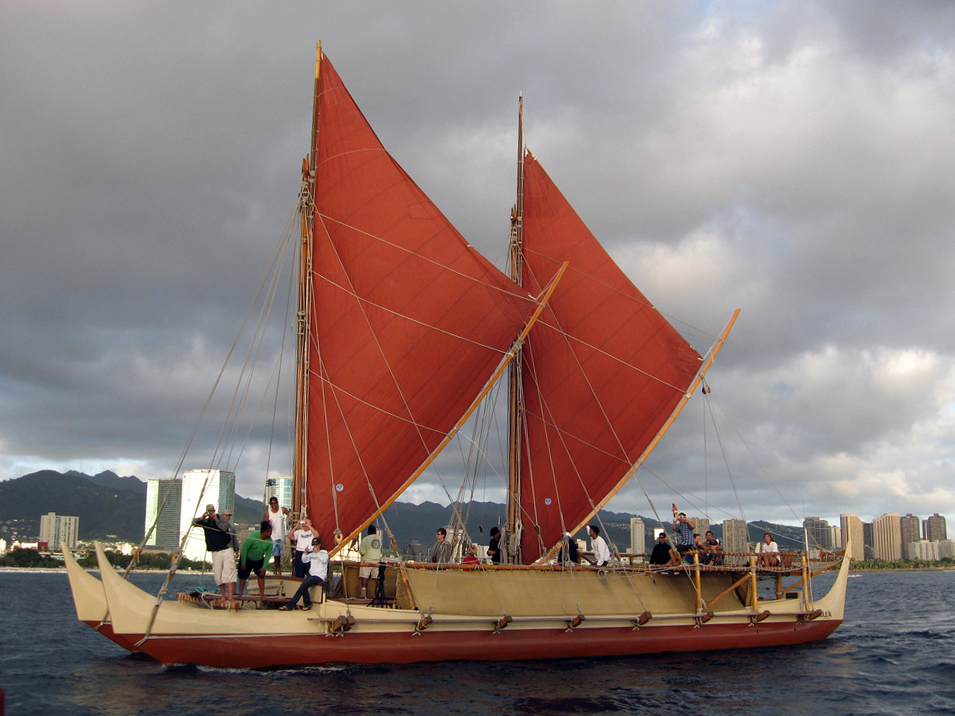
The Hōkūleʻa, a waka hourua from Hawaii

==== Cook Islands ====
- Vaka
- Vaka katea

==== Hawaiʻi ====
- Malia
- Wa'a
- Wa'a kaulua

==== Marquesas ====
- Vaka touʻua

==== New Zealand ====
- Waka ama
- Waka hourua

==== Samoa ====
- ʻAlia
- Amatasi
- Laʻau
- Lualua (Foulua)
- Paopao
- Vaʻa
- Vaʻa-alo
- Vaʻa-tele

==== Society Islands ====
- Ivahah
- Pahi
- Tipairua
- Vaʻa

==== Tonga ====
- Hamatafua
- Kalia
- Pōpao
- Tongiaki

==== Tuvalu ====
- Paopao

=== Madagascar ===
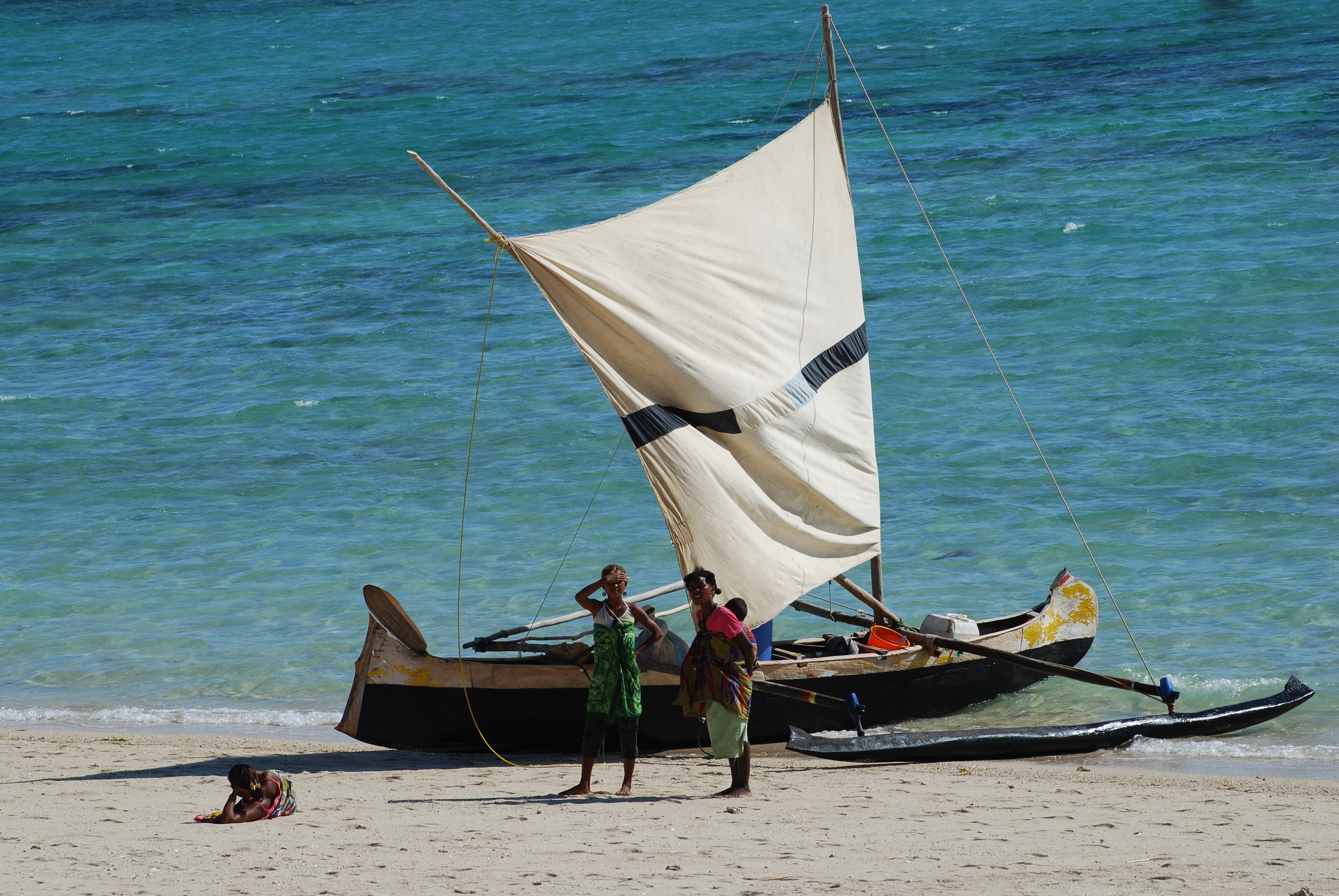
A single-outrigger lakana from Madagascar

- Lakana

== See also ==
- Lashed-lug boat
- Proa
- Crab claw sail
- Tanja sail
