= Kaep (disambiguation) =

Kaep is a nickname for athlete Colin Kaepernick (although he prefers "Kap"). It may also refer to:

- Kaep, a Micronesian sailboat
- KAEP-LP, a TV station in El Paso, Texas
- KAEP-FM, a radio station in Spokane, Washington
