= Jellore =

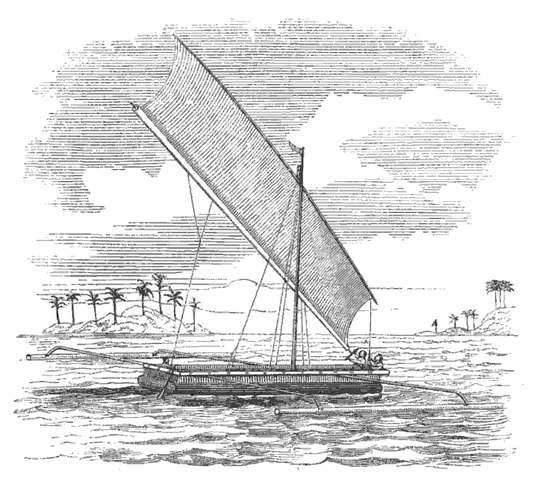
A jellore in 1863.

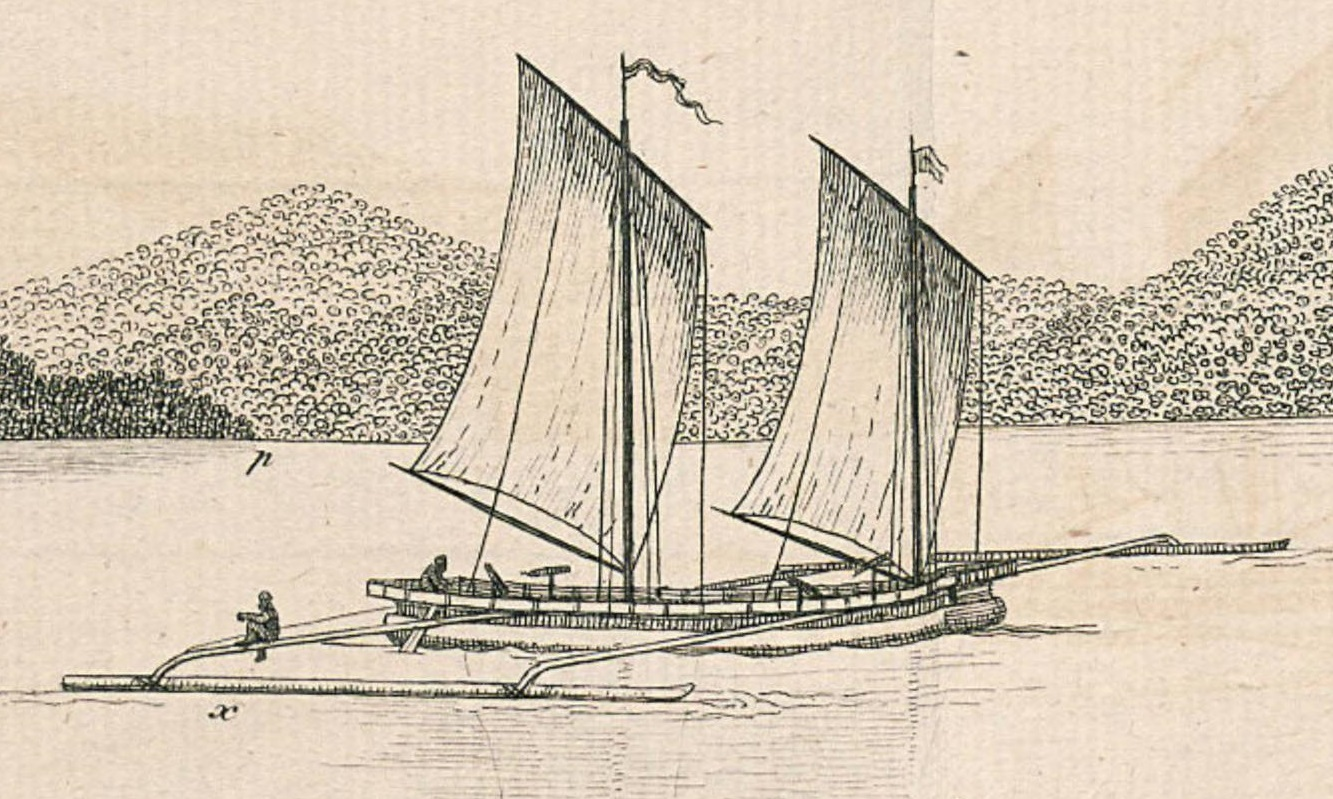
Jellore with 2 lug sails.

Jellore is a traditional Sumatran sailing craft. These boats are long and narrow, and fitted with double outriggers that stands out considerable distance from the sides. Sometimes they only have one outrigger, which is alternately set in windward and leeward. These boats are rigged with tanja rig. When the sail is partly furled, the ends of the two booms curve downwardly and inserted into the floats of the outrigger.

== See also ==
- Paduwang
- Knabat bogolu
- Sampan panjang
- Jongkong
