= Londe =

Traditional outrigger boat from North Sulawesi

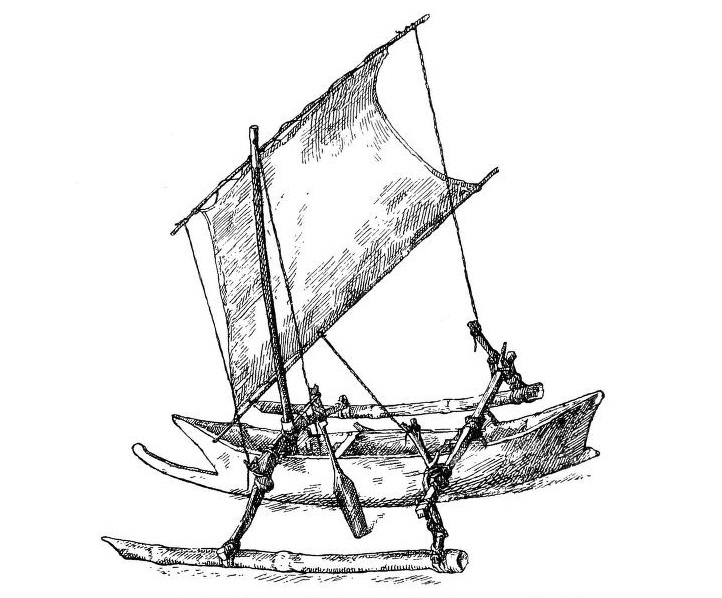
Model of a londi with tanja sail, 1889.

Londe or londi is a traditional boat from North Sulawesi, Indonesia. They are thought to have existed since the 1500s, developed from ancient an Sangir islands boat called bininta which is now enshrined in the symbol of the region of Sangir Islands District.

== Description ==
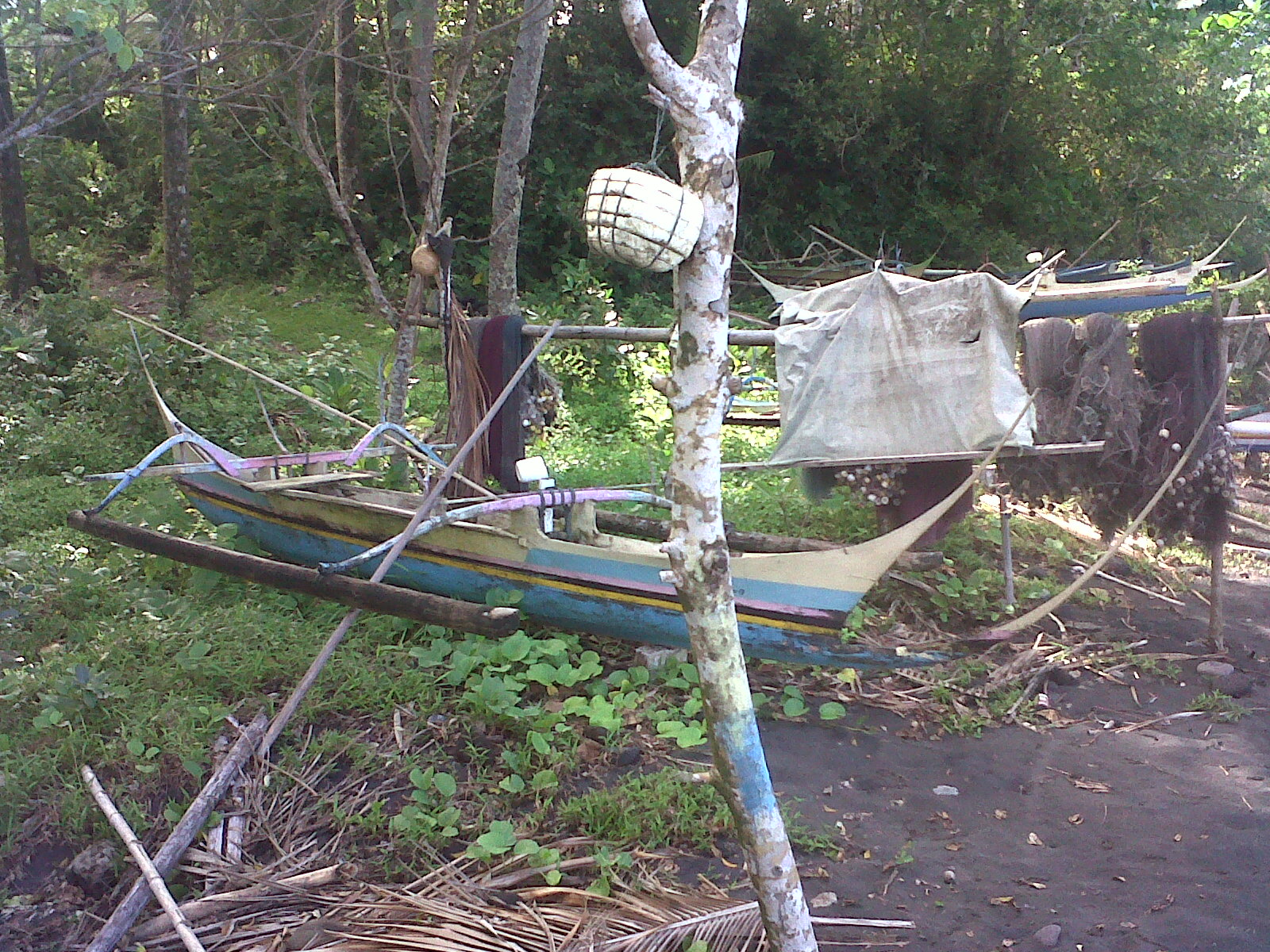
The bininta, a type of prahu which has been used before the arrival of the Europeans.

They are about 5 m in length, generally they are driven by paddle but sail may also be used. Modern londe can be equipped with an outboard motor. The sail can be of tanja, lete, or lug sail type. Sometimes they are 25–30 ft (7.6-9.1 m) long with a 30 in (76.2 cm) beam. They are usually operated by 1–3 men, but large ones could carry 5 men. A londe can be identified by its unique bow and stern. A kind of "horn" pokes out from the bottom of the bow protruding forward and curling upwards like an elephant tusk. At the stern the horn is not so prominent but the form can be seen, protruding backward. Its supposed predecessor, bininta, has on its bow and stern a horn that pokes toward the front and back. Another distinguishing feature from other outrigger canoe, the londe has different bahateng (outrigger boom/beam) on the front and the back. The fore boom is a strongly curved piece of wood lashed to the atiq (outrigger float made of bamboo) without a tadiq (the linking piece between bahateng and atiq). The atiq is made by two or three pieces of thick bamboo lashed together. While the aft boom is a straight piece of wood linked to the atiq with a curved rattan tadiq, the so-called S-shaped Halmaheran attachment. Londe is constructed with added planks on the side of its mahera (dugout base). The main material is nantu/nato wood, gopasa wood, or kapuraca wood. With a fair wind, londe can go very fast but somewhat difficult to tack and cannot sail very close to the wind.

== Distribution ==
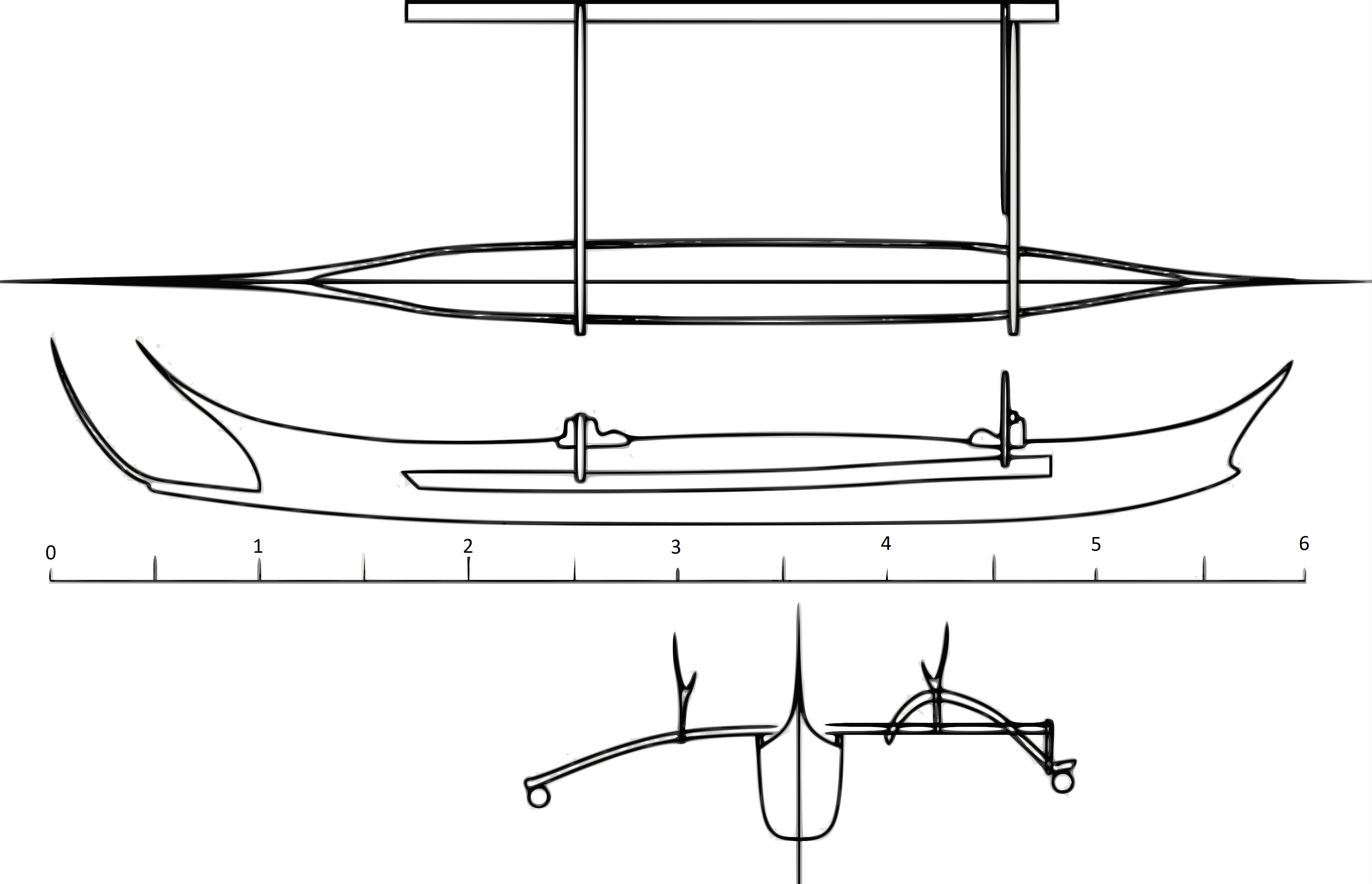
Londe of Sangir island.

In the 1980s londe boats were still widely found along the coast through Manado from Ranayapo, Poopo, Sario (Manado), Likupang to Batulubang near Bitung. Also found in Barangka, Tahuna, Naha and Lirung in the Sangihe Islands. The londe boat at that time was a sailboat used extensively in Sangir fisherman settlements. In 2012, on Miangas Island, the outermost island on the border with the Philippines, there are still many londe boats. However, in the same year, on the island of Marore in the Talaud Islands londe is no longer found which according to local residents there are many on the island in the past.

The extinction of a londe boat is not because fishermen no longer need boats of the same size and functionality. The londe type began to go extinct because fishermen now no longer need the function of the "horns", so they no longer order such boats. The horns were used as a place to hold, to rest, or to look into the sea at the time of collecting or capturing fishes by diving.

== See also ==
- Vinta
- Pelang
- Jukung
- Paduwang
- Knabat bogolu
