= Jukung tambangan =

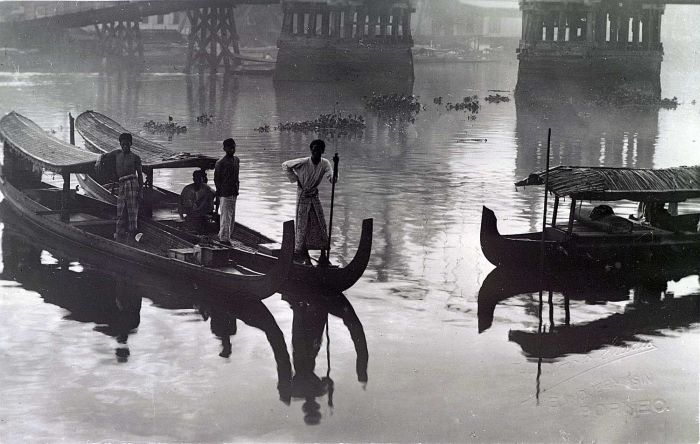
Three jukung tambangan on Martapura river.

Jukung tambangan is a traditional boat made by the Banjar people of South Kalimantan. They are mainly used for riverine transportation. It is already present at least since mid-18th century. They were not seen anymore in Banjarmasin ca. 1950s and around the 1970s on the Nagara River, Hulu Sungai Selatan Regency.

== Etymology ==
The word jukung is used as umbrella term to describe all types of boats, mainly to wooden boats. The Dayak and the Banjarese word jukung are therefore especially associated with those boat types. It may have its root from Austronesian word d’u(n)kung.

== Description ==
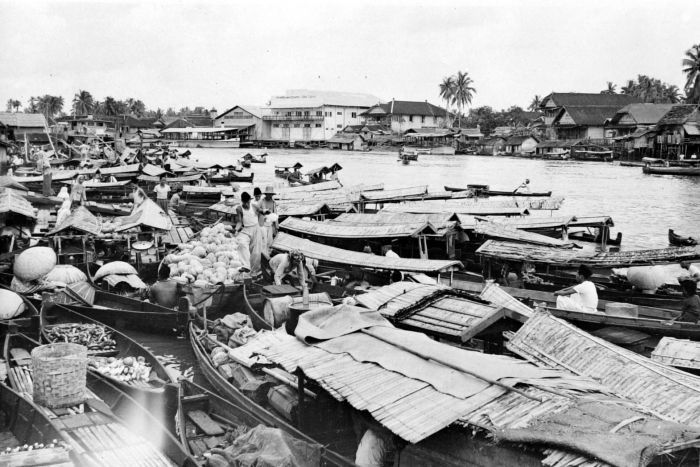
Banjarmasin floating market

Jukung tambangan is made from kayu ulin (Bornean ironwood). There is a carving of daun jaruju (Acanthus ilicifolius) near the waterline. Jukung tambangan is not a dugout canoe, it needs a keel in construction. It is intentionally not built using iron nails, but using dowel technique. Arrangement of boards is using carvel built. In the mid-19th century, sirap (wooden shingle) roofing from ulin wood were used and traded. The roofing is produced in the Dusun Hulu and sold or bartered to Banjarmasin. The sirap roofing can only be installed with a type of iron nails, not with wooden pegs. An example of a jukung tambangan is 12,40 meter long, 1,34 meter wide, and 59 cm in depth.

== Role ==
The function of jukung tambangan is for transportation, formerly they are only used by merchant, nobleman, and rich persons. But then since the early 20th century (or at least until the end of the 19th century), it has been widely used by commoners for passenger transportation, family reunions, funeral, marriages, and more. They also took part in local pasar terapung (floating market). The floating market of Banjar people is already exist since at least 1600s.

During the Banjar war (1859–1906), the jukung tambangan was used by Banjar fighters, among others, when they attacked the Dutch at Margasari on the night of December 16, 1861, and used to flee to the Jaya river, a tributary of Nagara river.

== Gallery ==
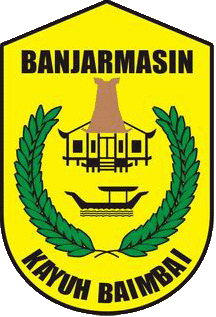
Jukung tambangan can be seen on Banjarmasin emblem.

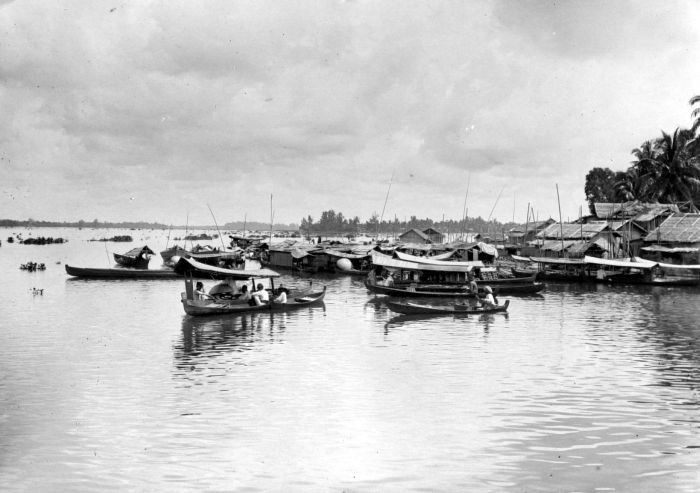
In Barito river, waiting for favorable tide to sail to the capital.

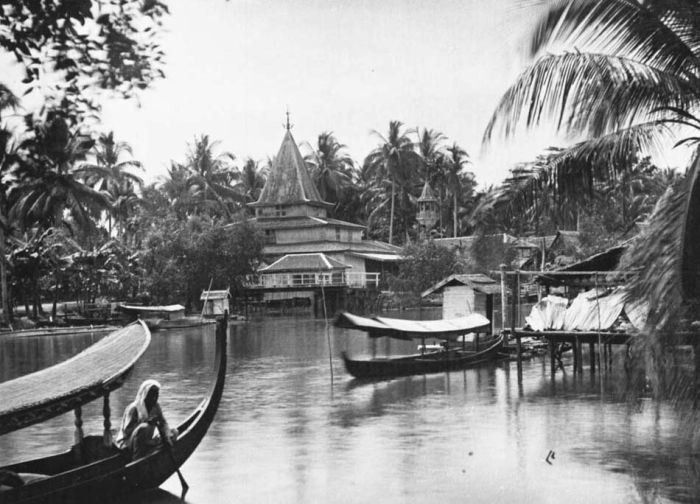
Near a mosque.

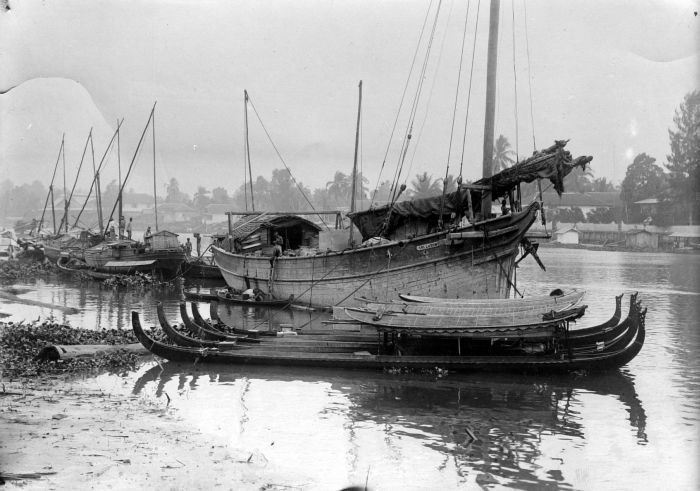
Ship from Madura along the banks of the Martapura River in Banjarmasin, South Borneo, where (in the foreground) also typical Banjarese gondola-shaped prahus (jukung tambangan) are situated.

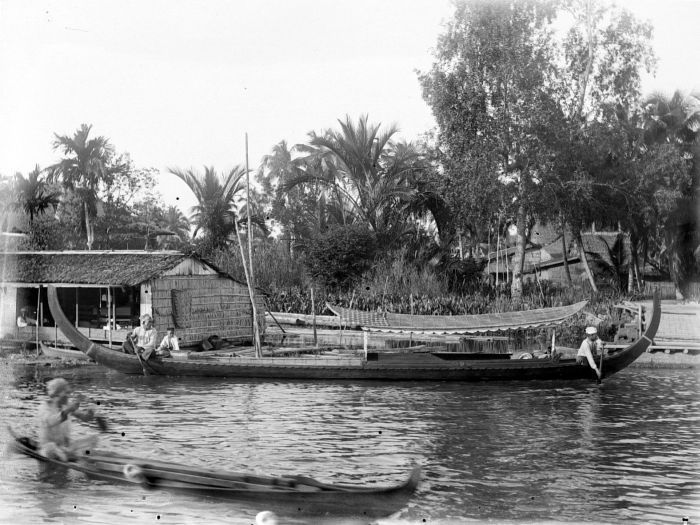
View from the side

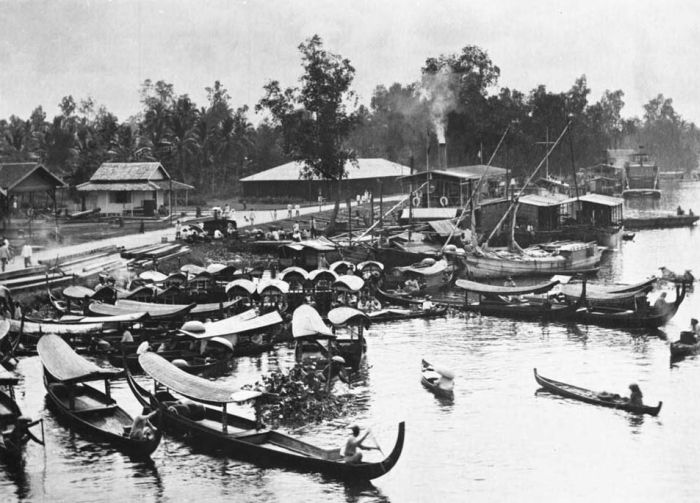
Jukung tambangan and a paddle steamer on the riverside

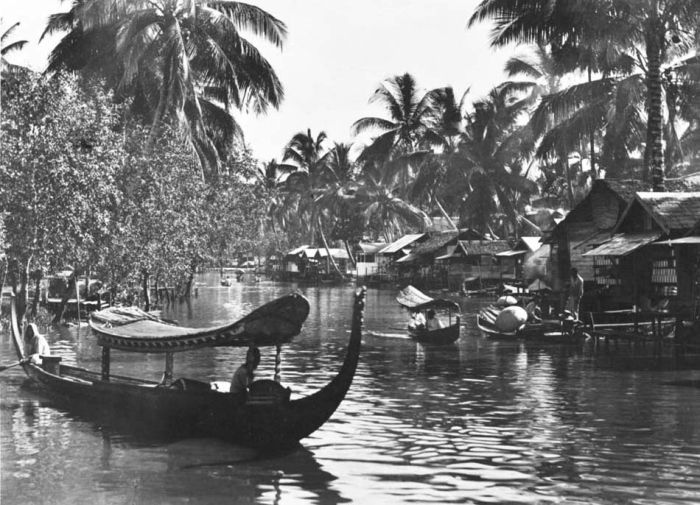
Prahu and houses

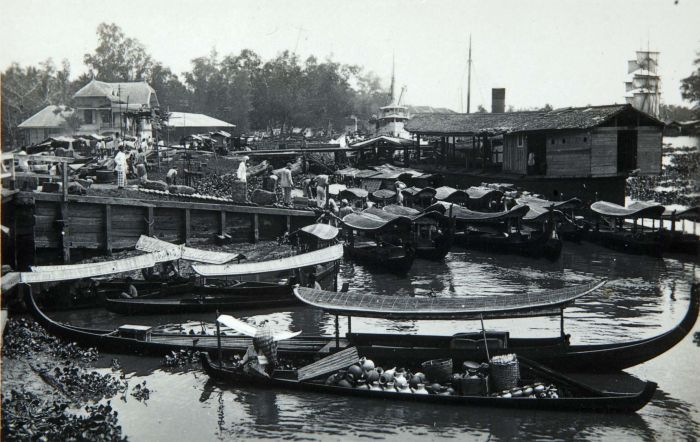
View over the market along the Martapura river in Banjarmasin

== See also ==
- Sampan panjang, racing boat from 19th century
- Toop, merchant boat used widely in the 19th century Malay archipelago
- Lepa-lepa (dugout canoe)
- Palari
- Tongkang
- Sampan
