= Kulibo =

Filipino motor boat

Kulibo, or Kulibu, is a small wooden motorized traditional fishing boat with short double outriggers used by Tausug, Sama-Bajau, and Yakan people of the Philippines. Characterized as "ring-netters," they are classified as "small-scale commercial fishing vessels." This type of boat is commonly used by fisherfolk in Tawi-Tawi to catch small fishes, usually during the night.

== See also ==
- Bangka (boat)
- Jungkung
- Lepa
- Vinta
- Djenging
- Garay (ship)
- Balangay
