= Banting (boat) =

Traditional boat of Aceh

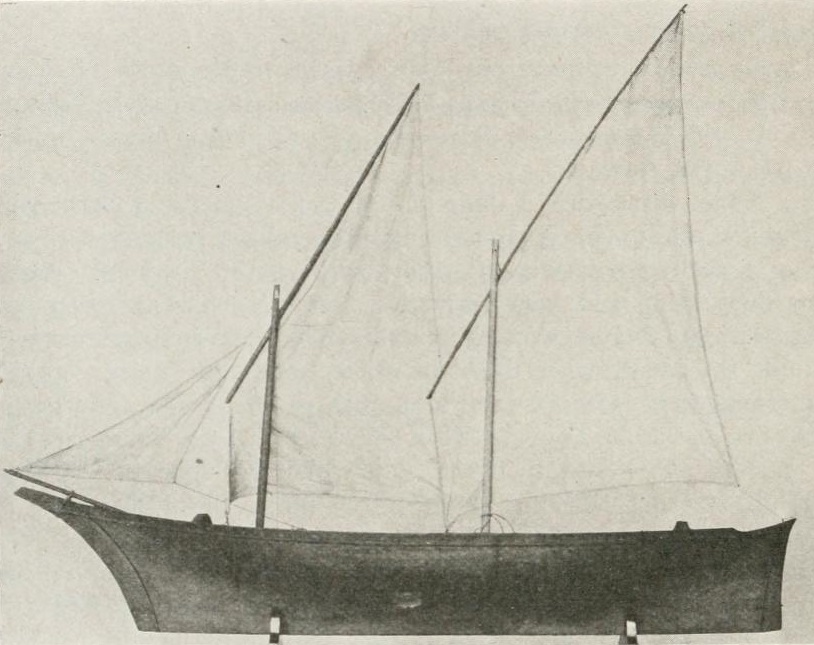
This type of lug-rigged dugout, locally called "banting" or "atcheen" (Aceh) boat commonly used at Johor.

Banting is a traditional boat from Aceh, Indonesia. It is also used in other areas near Malacca strait, such as Johor, where they are called "fast boat". Eredia's account of Malacca (1613) described banting of Ujontana (Malay peninsula) as a kind of skiff, smaller than jalea, carrying oars and 2 masts, with 2 rudders (one on both sides), and used for naval warfare.

In Johor, they are dugout canoe with long, sharp, hollow bow, with hollow, sharp floor. Banting is an open boat, with the inside of gunwales or ribbands fitted with holes for thole pins. It has two masts and bowsprit; carries two loosefooted balance lug (or settee) sails and small jib. Mitman recorded a banting's dimensions as follows: 33 ft 4 in (10.16 m) LOA; 5 ft 10 in (1.78 m) width; 2 ft 11 in (0.89 m) depth. The bowsprit protrude 10 in (25 cm) over the bow; the foremast is 10 ft 10 in (3.30 m) above gunwale. The yard of foresail is 16 ft 6.75 in (5.0483 m) in length. The mainmast is 12 ft 8.5 in (3.874 m) above the gunwale, with 20 ft 10 in (6.35 m) yard.

In 1902 H. Warington Smyth stated that the banting was frequently used by traders from Aceh; he further describes the boat as a two-masted trader type, built of giam wood. The boat's dimension was 90 feet (27 m) long, 27 feet (8.2 m) wide, 7 feet (2.1 m) depth, 2 ft (61 cm) freeboard; it had a capacity of 12 koyan (29 tons) and the number of on-board crew was 6. The length of the mainmast was 50 feet (15 m).

== See also ==
- Sampan panjang
- Bangkong
- Kelulus
