= Cerucuh =

Ancient Malay trading boat

Cerucuh (also written as cheruchoh, charochah, cheruchup, cerucah, and cerucup) is an ancient, small Malay trading boat. One of the earliest record of cerucuh has a background of 14th century, being mentioned in Malay Annals which was composed no earlier than 17th century, being used by Majapahit empire during the first Majapahit attack on Singapura (1350). Malay Annals recorded:

Maka betara Majapahitpun menitahkan hulubalangnya berlengkap perahu akan menyerang Singapura itu, seratus buah jung; lain dari itu beberapa melangbing dan kelulus, jongkong, cerucuh, tongkang, tiada terhisabkan lagi banyaknya.
So the king of Majapahit ordered his war commander to equip vessels for attacking Singapore, a hundred jong; other than that a few melangbing and kelulus; jongkong, cerucuh, tongkang, all in uncountable numbers.

== See also ==
- Kelulus
- Jongkong
- Pelang
