= Pajala (boat) =

Traditional fishing boat from Indonesia

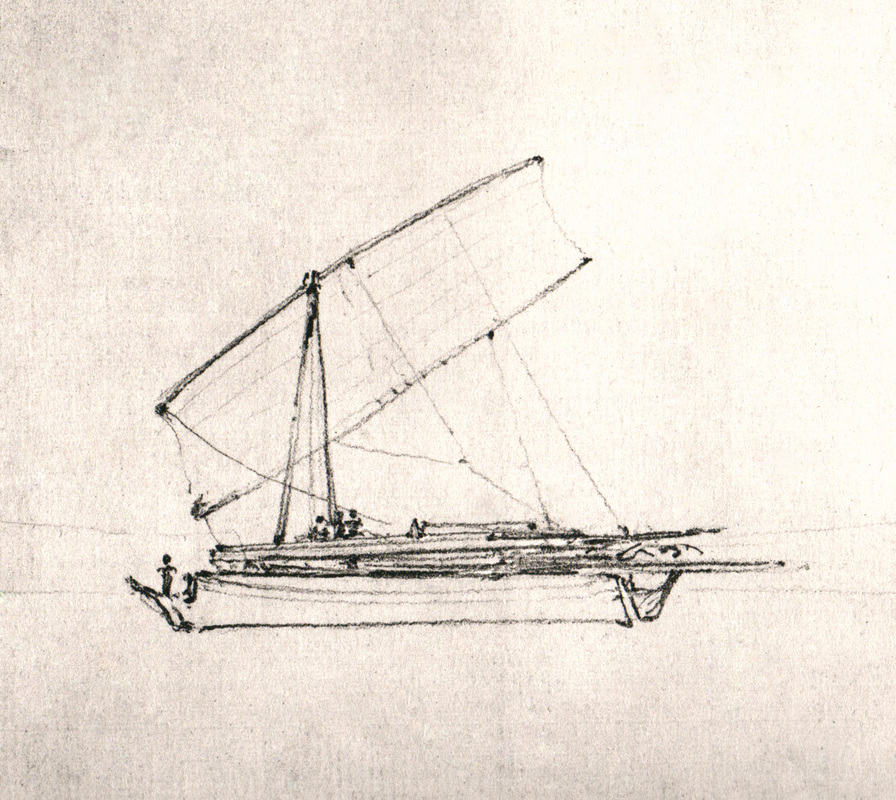
Double-ended Bugis-Makassan pajala-style ship with tripod masts and canted rectangular sails (some of them lowered and stowed on deck), as well as quarter-hung rudders. This picture is made in 1803 by artist William Westall about a Bugis prahu in the Arnhem coast. The chance comes when Flinders met with Makassan prahu fleet when they're collecting tripang. This prahu weights 25 tons and armed with small cannons.

Pajala is a type of traditional perahu from western South Sulawesi, Indonesia. It is used mainly for fishing, but in the present it is a Bugis/Makassar name for small to medium-sized boat hull.

== Etymology ==
The name comes from Indonesian/Malay word jala, which means net. The prefix pa- is an equivalent to English suffix -or/-er. Thus the name "pajala" can be translated as "fishing boat that use net".

== Description ==
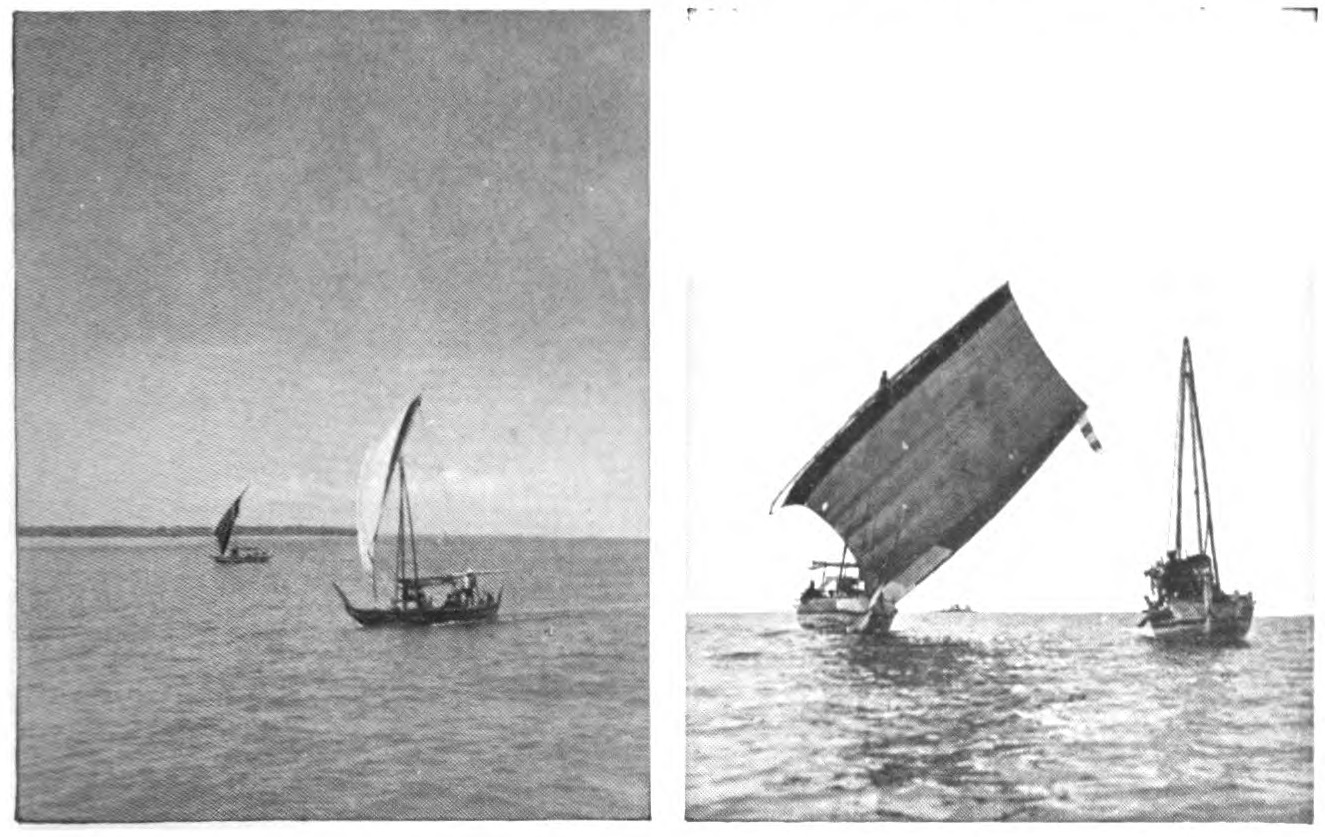
Pajala boats, ca. 1937.

Pajala is an undecked coasting boat which usually has a tripod mast carrying a single large tanja sail. It is carvel-built, and like other Austronesian boat, it is a double ender (the bow and stern of the boat is sharp, i.e. having stem and sternpost). The bow and stern were similar in shape, usually turn sharply because the board is cut, not bent, into shapes. The pattern of the planks indicates that it was no different from traditional boats from 1000 years ago. The first plank is longer than the keel. The plank is arranged from corner to corner with internal dowels. While mainly deckless, there is a low deck abaft the stempost, behind it is a place for washing. It is built using smooth curved planks, with double quarter rudders, used as a frame and the ribs are placed thereafter.

== See also ==
- Palari
- Patorani
- Mayang
- Benawa
