= Tipairua =

Tahitian canoe

Tipairua were large traditional sailing canoes of Tahiti that were of stately bearing and significance. They were often used for deep sea voyages, had low heads, high upturned sterns, and could be either paddled or sailed. They could carry 4-20 people and it could become 21 metres. The ship was meant for local chiefs and leaders.
