= Bajak =

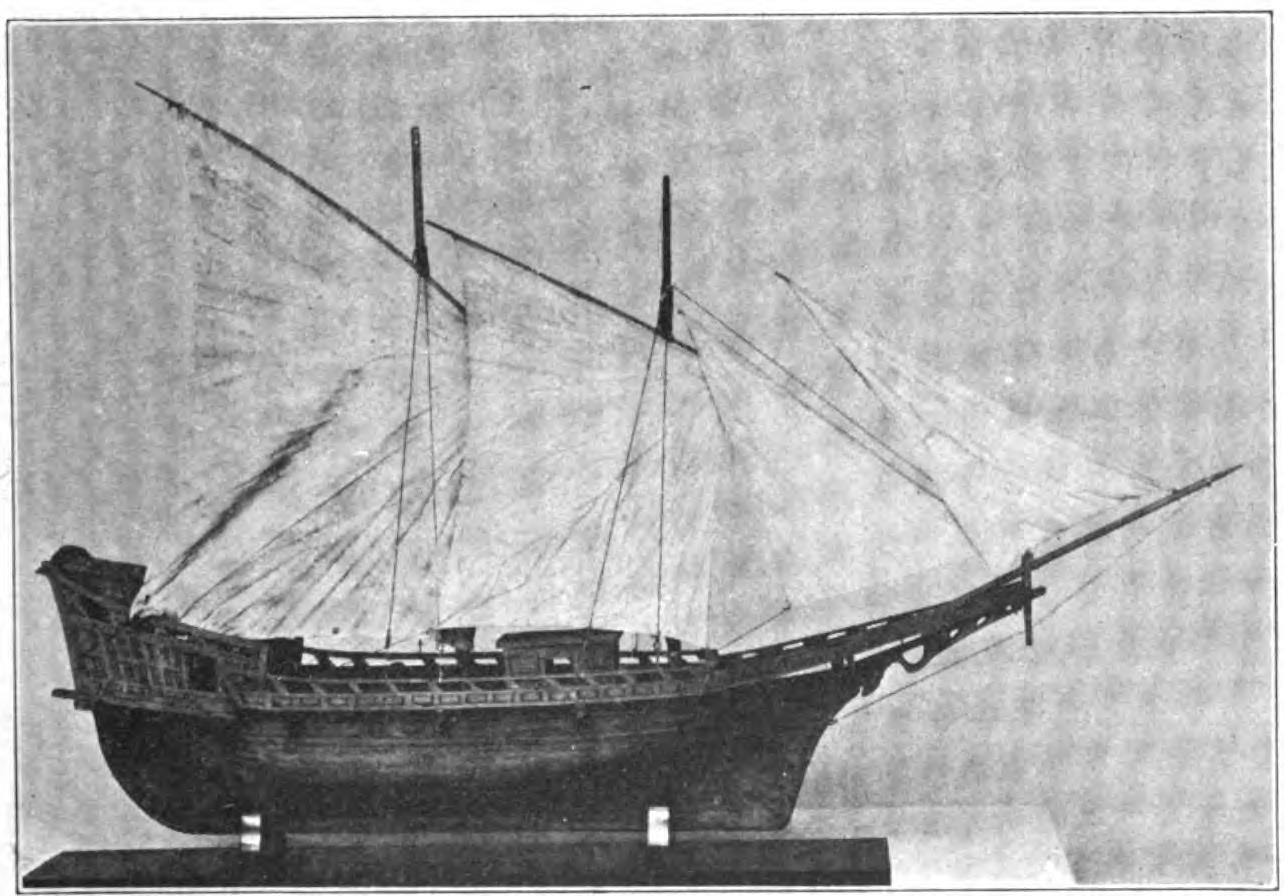
Dayak lug-rigged prahu, called bajak.

Bajak is a type of sailing prahu of the Dayak people of Borneo. It is propelled by both sail and oars. The bajak has a sharp but hollow bow, with projection at top. It has large square stern which projects at the sides of the hull and supported by two strong beams. On the side of the vessel are projecting open galleries for oarsmen. Bajak has two mast with lug rig, and a bowsprit which support headsails (fore staysail and jib). The sail of bajak is made of cotton. It has a large deckhouse between the foremast and mainmast, a hatchway is present abaft the mainmast. The name may have originated from Malay word bajak means "plow", or membajak, "to plow". This prahu may have been used by Sea Dayak for use in piracy owing to its double type of propulsion (sail and oar) which is very common amongst pirate prahu of the region, and may have influenced the Javanese word bajak, which means hijack or piracy. Javanese word bajak laut means sea pirate.

A bajak recorded by Dr. G. Brown Goode is about 17.6 m LOA, 13.7 m in hull length, 3.7 m hull width, with total width of 4.6 m. It has a depth of 4.9 m. The foremast is 10.5 m tall above the deck, with 8.6 m long main yard, and the mizzenmast and mizzen yard themselves are 6.4 m and 4.6 m, respectively.

== See also ==
- Lancang
- Bangkong
- Lambo
