= Benawa =

Type of ship from Gowa

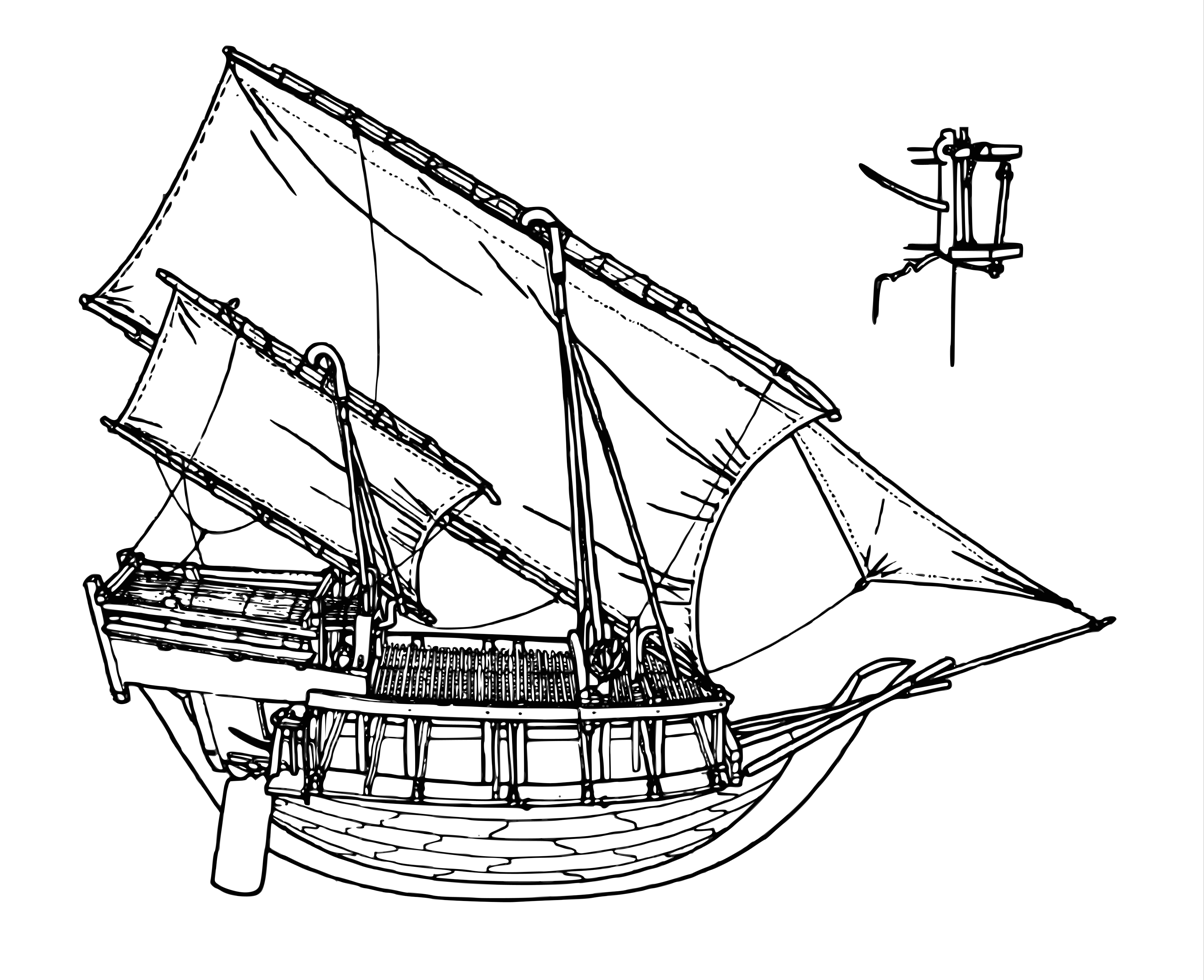
Vector drawing of a banawa of Gowa, Sulawesi island. There is an inset of the rudder mounting. This ship showed a headsail, which is a European influence.

Benawa or banawa is a type of ship from Gowa, an old principality in the southwest corner of Sulawesi, Indonesia. The earliest record of this vessel is from Hikayat Banjar, which was written in or not long after 1663. In the present, this vessel is already extinct; being replaced by vessels with a similar hull, namely palari and padewakang.

== Etymology ==
The word benawa or banawa comes from the Old Javanese language, which means boat or ship. In different languages, the word may refer to a different type of vessel, depending on the context of the sentence.

== Description ==
The benawa was made for transporting horses and buffaloes. The hull is wide with a convex keel, with a high front and back stem and sternpost. On either side, there are paths attached to a number of transverse beams that are attached to the supports. The secondary function of these beams is to divide the deck space into equal compartments for animals. The deck above the "stable" consist of bamboo lattice.

It is steered with two quarter rudders, with helmsmen standing on the outboard galleries. The rudders are mounted on heavy crossbeams in such a way as to allow rapid emergency release. There is a cramped cabin for the captain below the poop deck. The vessel has two or three masts, three-legged posts with the hind legs attached to heavy tabernacles. The mast can be lowered easily if the forelegs pop out of the hooks that hold them in place. The sails are tanja and made with karoro matting. With European influence in the latter centuries, western-styled sails can also be used. In the past, Makassarese sailors may have sailed them as far as New Guinea and Singapore.

== See also ==
- Toop
- Padewakang
- Jong
- Golekan
