= Knabat bogolu =

Traditional war vessel from Mentawai, Indonesia

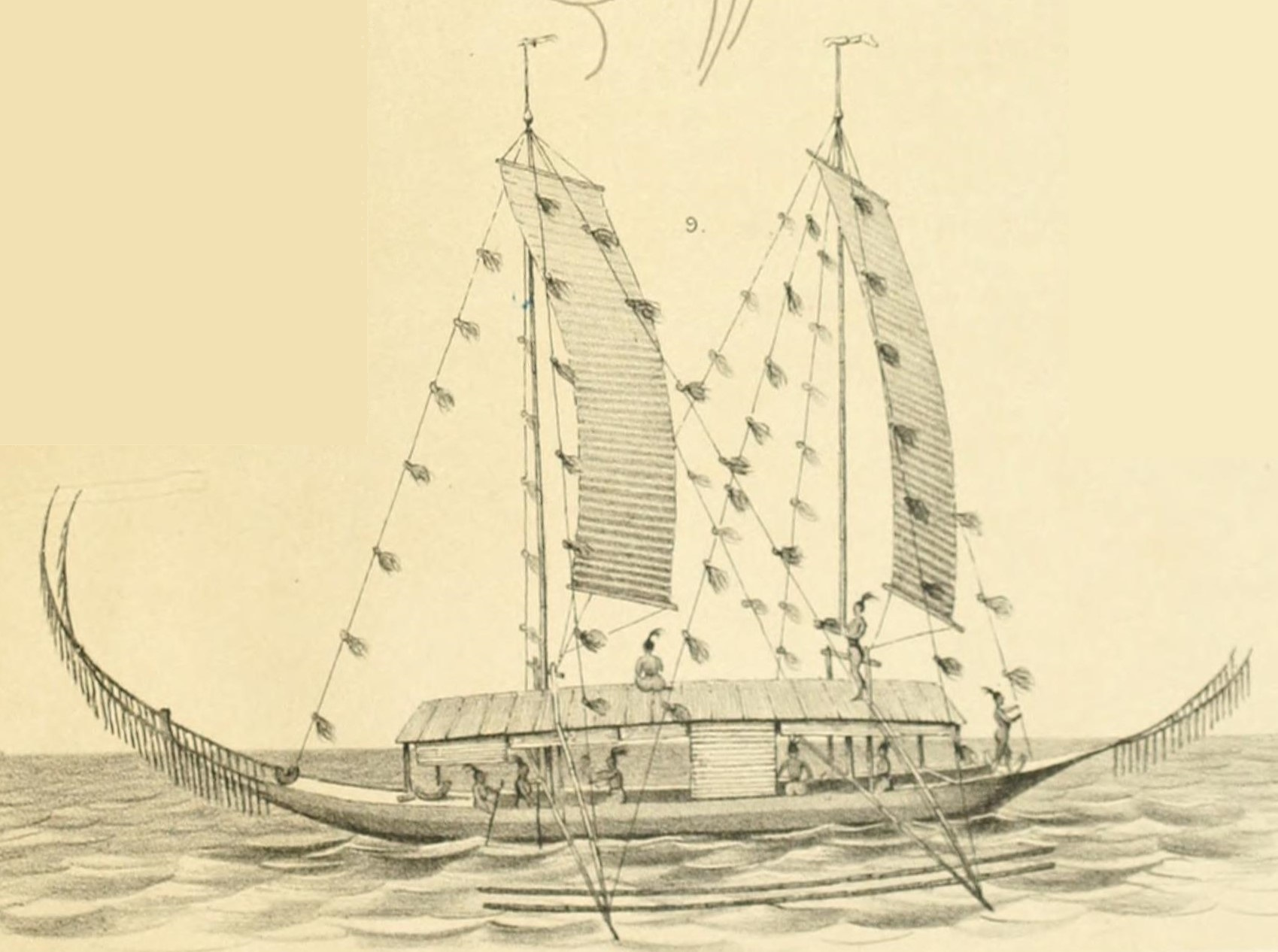
A Knabat Bogolu from 1847

Knabat bogolu is a type of traditional war vessel from Mentawai islands, west Sumatra, Indonesia.

== Background ==
This vessel is shaped like a kora kora, but with different outrigger boom placement. Like kora kora, it also has deckhouse at the center of the hull. It has two main booms which slope down to the float (katir in Malay language) and each has an accessory boom. A boom-spar is located above the vessel, one end of which rests on the roof. The float (katir) is double on each side. It has two masts, each rigged with narrow, very high sails from bamboo and palm leaf.

The stern of the vessel is more highly arched than the bow. Both the bow and the stern had decorative tufts and ropes. The roofing is solid through the entire length, about 30–40 ft (9.1–12.2 m) long. At the bottom of this shelter weapons and food are stored in the hold of the vessel. When going to war it will be stocked full of provisions. On such a journey from which the women are excluded, all fighters are adorned in full armor. The number of crew they carry could be up to 100 men.

== See also ==
- Paduwang
- Sandeq
- Jongkong
