= Junkung =

Filipino motor boat

Junkung, also spelled jungkung or jungkong, is a small wooden sail to motorized boat used by Tausug, Sama-Bajau, and Yakan people of the Philippines. It is a fast cargo ship and is commonly used as a smuggling vessel in the maritime borders of the Philippines, Sabah, Malaysia and Eastern Indonesia. They are also sometimes used by pirates and Abu Sayyaf terrorists in and around the Sulu Sea.

The junkung is smaller than the tempel and can accommodate around 25 to 30 people. Unlike the similarly named junkun and jukung, it does not have outriggers. It is also a much larger ship than the jongkong, which is a dugout canoe.

== See also ==
- Lepa
- Vinta
- Djenging
- Garay (ship)
- Balangay
