= Lepa-lepa (dugout canoe) =

Traditional canoe from East Indonesia

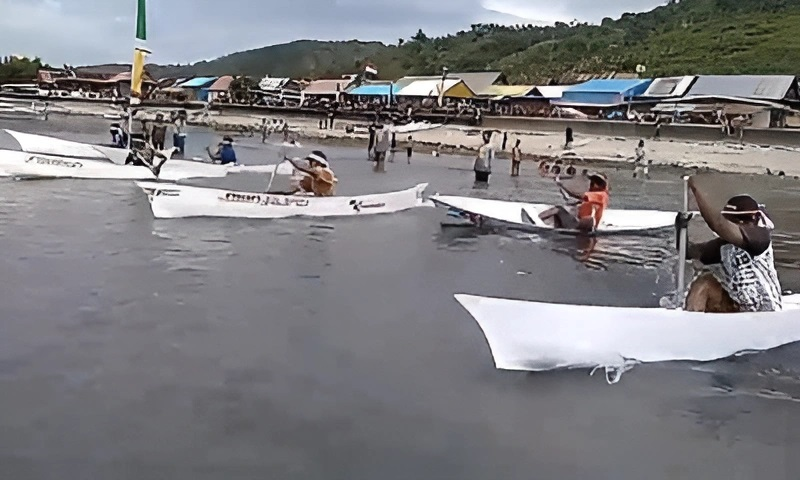
A lepa-lepa race in Pambusuang, 2016.

Lepa-lepa is a traditional canoe from the eastern part of the Indonesian archipelago. They are short range coastal fishing craft, but they can also be used for inter island voyages. The routes they took, among others are between Seram and Ambon-Lease, Geser island and Seram Laut, within Banda and Kei group of islands. They are already existed since at least 1500 A.D.

== Description ==
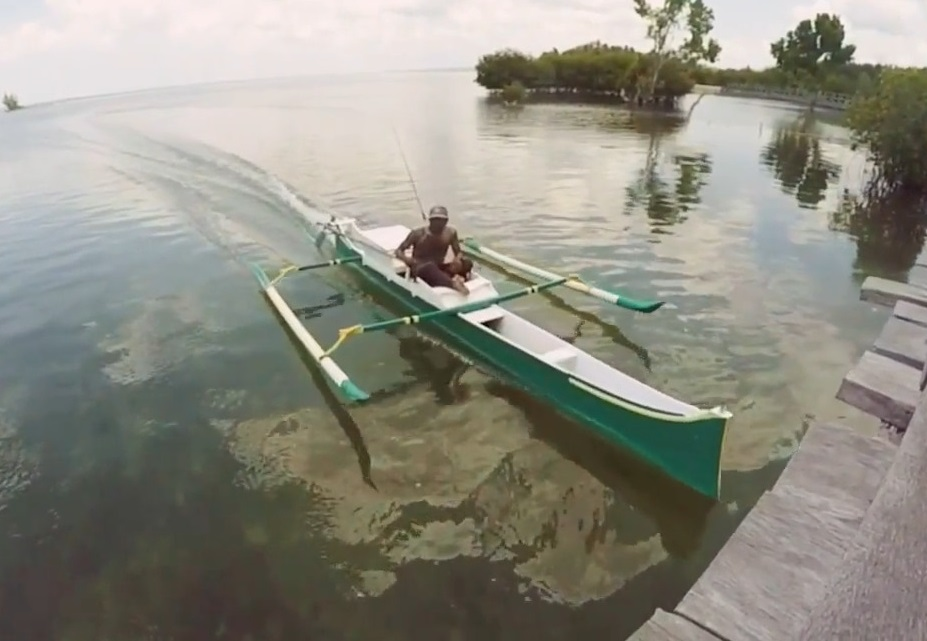
Motorized lepa-lepa with double outrigger.

Traditional lepa-lepa canoe is made from single piece of hollowed wood (dugout base). The wood can be of various sizes. They can be used with or without a sail, as they can be propelled with paddles (called wosa in native language) and quant poles (doan). Some of them may be equipped with double outrigger. Lepa-lepa may be enlarged by adding additional planks to its sides. A boat that has been added with a kalulis prow is called lepa-lepa kalulis. The sails used are from nade, gaff, and tanja types. After 1980s lepa-lepa began to be modernized by adding outboard motor. Modern lepa-lepa is made by fiberglass. A lepa-lepa may be 3.4–9.3 m long, with 40–80 cm width, and depth of 30–55 cm.

== Role ==
Lepa-lepa is mainly used for fishing. They are also used for transporting, such as transporting trading products (sago, fish, green vegetables), and people. Lepa-lepa is suitable for maneuvering through narrow shallow channel using combination of quant poles and paddles. In the present however, it is not considered appropriate to sail or paddle for long distances using them, and motorized lepa-lepa are more often used.

== See also ==
- Orembai
- Kalulis
- Lambo
