= Kaep =

Micronesian sailboat

Shunting technique on a kaep

Kaep is a traditional type of double-ended Proa sailboat native to Palau. Some of the essential design elements have also been adopted as a modern smaller multihull prototype variant. (Note: That uses a modified and patented Windsurfer rig.)

== Larger context ==
The Pacific Ocean and particularly Micronesia gave birth to many different forms of simple sailing craft. Sail plan and hull form differ. Sail plans may include lateen, also known as crab-claw or half-crab-claw, Latin, or triangular. Hull formats include catamarans, doubles, proa, and singles. Presence of a beam spanning a double hull is optional. Likewise, hull end forms and shapes vary greatly. Masts for these types of sailboats can be made with one or two poles. The vessels may be made by hollowing out tree trunks, or may be assembled from planking. Other design considerations include the intended use of the vessel, for fishing, sea voyages or war, and whether they are to be used in sheltered lagoons or in the open sea.

Additionally, there is an important and fundamental dividing line between two design types. Some vessels "shunt", that is they change course direction by using the opposite pole of a two pole mast then sailing in the opposite direction (the "Pushmi-pullyu" of the sailing world). Others use a tacking rig, a design that is similar to sloop rigged boats found worldwide.

== History ==
Developed in Palau and used for centuries, the kaep was built from tree logs. A keel carved to a knife's edge was combined with a deep bow, giving it the ability to function in severe adverse weather, wind and waves. Sailors would crowd aft, lifting the bow out of the water, and increasing hull speed. It was used to fish, race and trade. It is a very fast craft.

The kaep lacks a rudder. Instead it has a "crab claw" sail, and is further controlled by the skillful use of fore and aft trim—moving the boat's balance point, that is the center of resistance relative to the center of effort—to control her heading. This is essentially like a wind surfer. See Sail twist.

A traditional kaep is double-ended with a reversible or pivoted (swiveling) mast, so that it can be sailed in either direction.

A traditional kaep has an average hull 10 m (33 ft) in length, 35 cm (14 in) in width, and maximum height of 90 cm (35 in).

The kaep has been the subject of commemorative postage stamps in Palau.

== See also ==
- List of multihulls
