= Paduwang =

Traditional outrigger boat in Indonesia

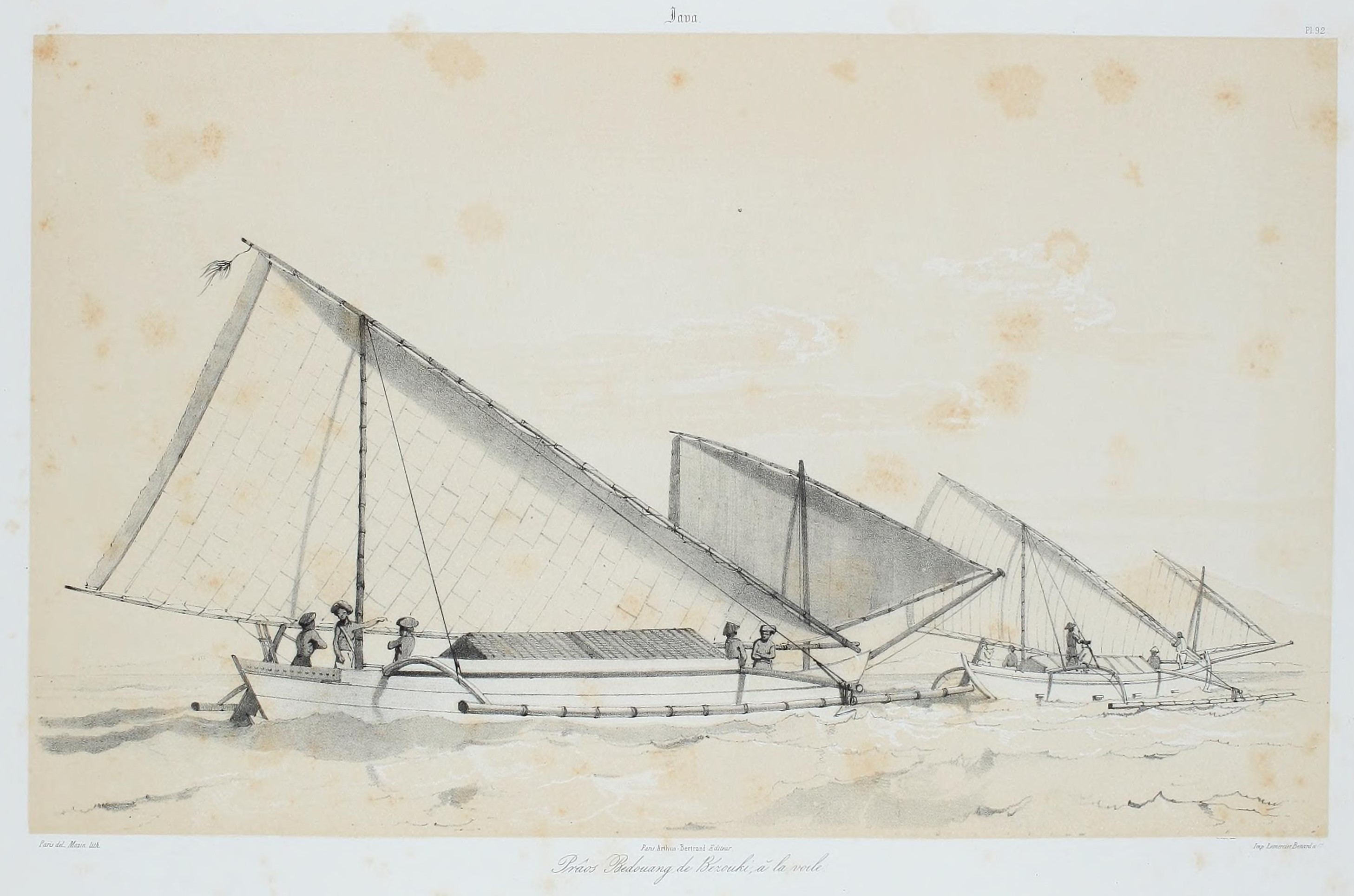
The two type of prahu paduwang (bedouang) sailing in the sea. Conventional-ended paduwang is at the front, bifid-ended paduwang is at the back.

Paduwang (also known as bedouang) is a traditional double-outrigger vessel from Madura, Indonesia. It is built with planks instead of single log, and used for fishing, trading and transport of people and goods near Madura island. In the 19th century, Paduwang was a popular fishing craft in East Java.

== Etymology ==
According to Horridge, the word “paduwang” have its roots from word wa, wangka, waga, wangga, and bangka of Austronesian languages. The term is associated with outrigger perahu or small perahu. The name bedouang is used by western observer such as admiral François-Edmond Pâris, possibly a mispronunciation of the name.

== Description ==
Paduwang had two short masts, one is on the bow and the other is about 1/3 of the length behind. The rigging is using lete rig, which has upper yard (called pebahu) and lower yard (pekaki). Pebahu is always supported by bamboo support pole (called sokong or supak). The foresail is mounted on a short mast, while the mainsail has no mast. The mainsail is kept in position by vangs and other ropes attached to its yard.

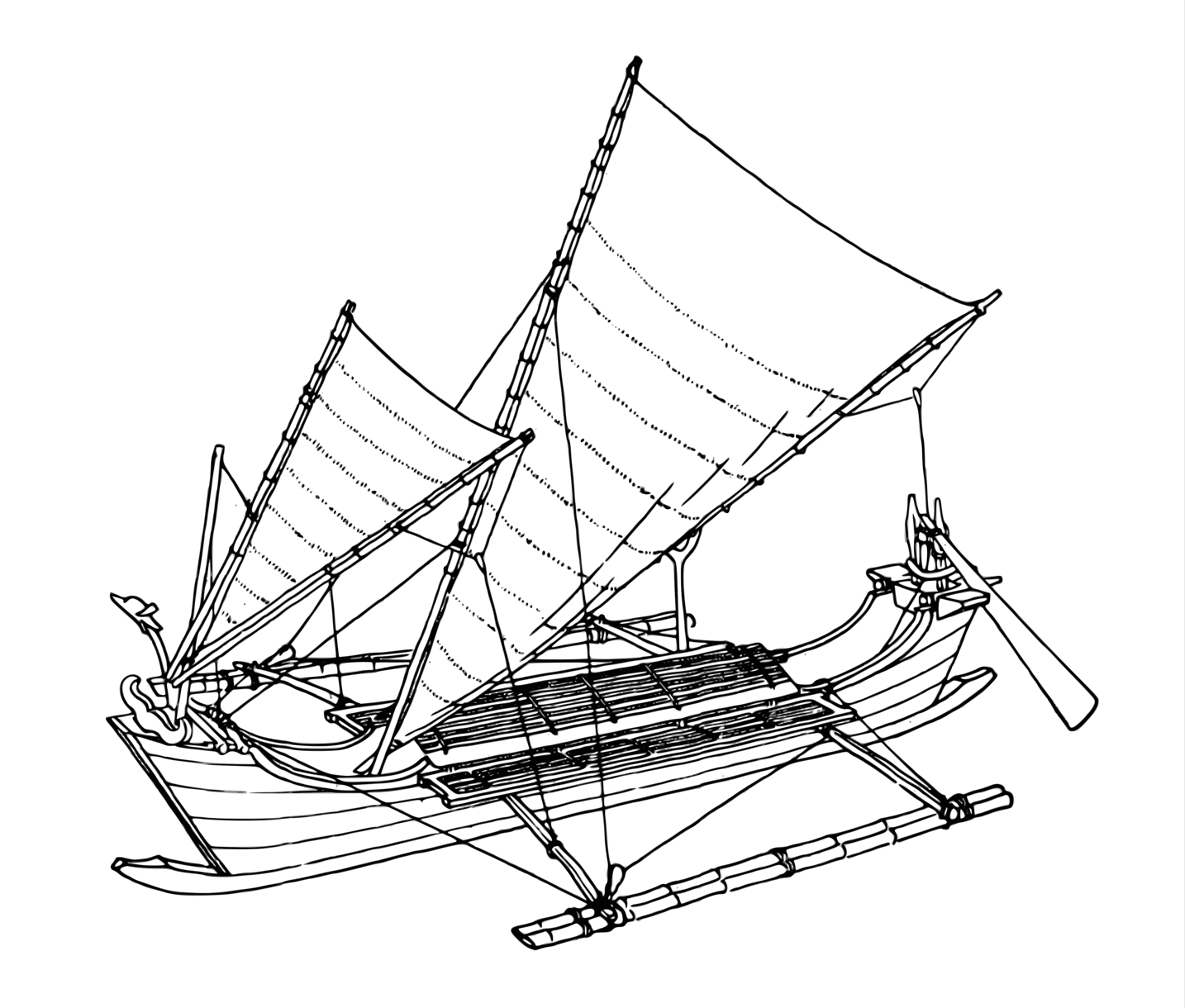
Model of a paduwang in National Museum, Leiden.

It has 2 versions, one with conventional ends, the other has bifid ends (meaning bifurcated shape at the bow and stern-forming a "jaw"). The hull is built on a dugout keel, both ends closed by simple vertical board. Paduwang only had 1 rudder, held by a rope, moored to a board. The rudder is always positioned under the direction of the wind, with such configuration that it can be switched to other side easily. Small paduwang is only 5 m in length, while large transport paduwang had a small deckhouse at the middle of the hull, and is about 14–16 m long. Paduwang can also be propelled using paddles. Large paduwang disappeared in the early 20th century, not long after the emergence of golekan.

== See also ==
Other fishing craft of Indonesia:

- Mayang
- Sandeq
- Patorani
- Pajala
