= Samudra Raksa =

Indonesian replica ship

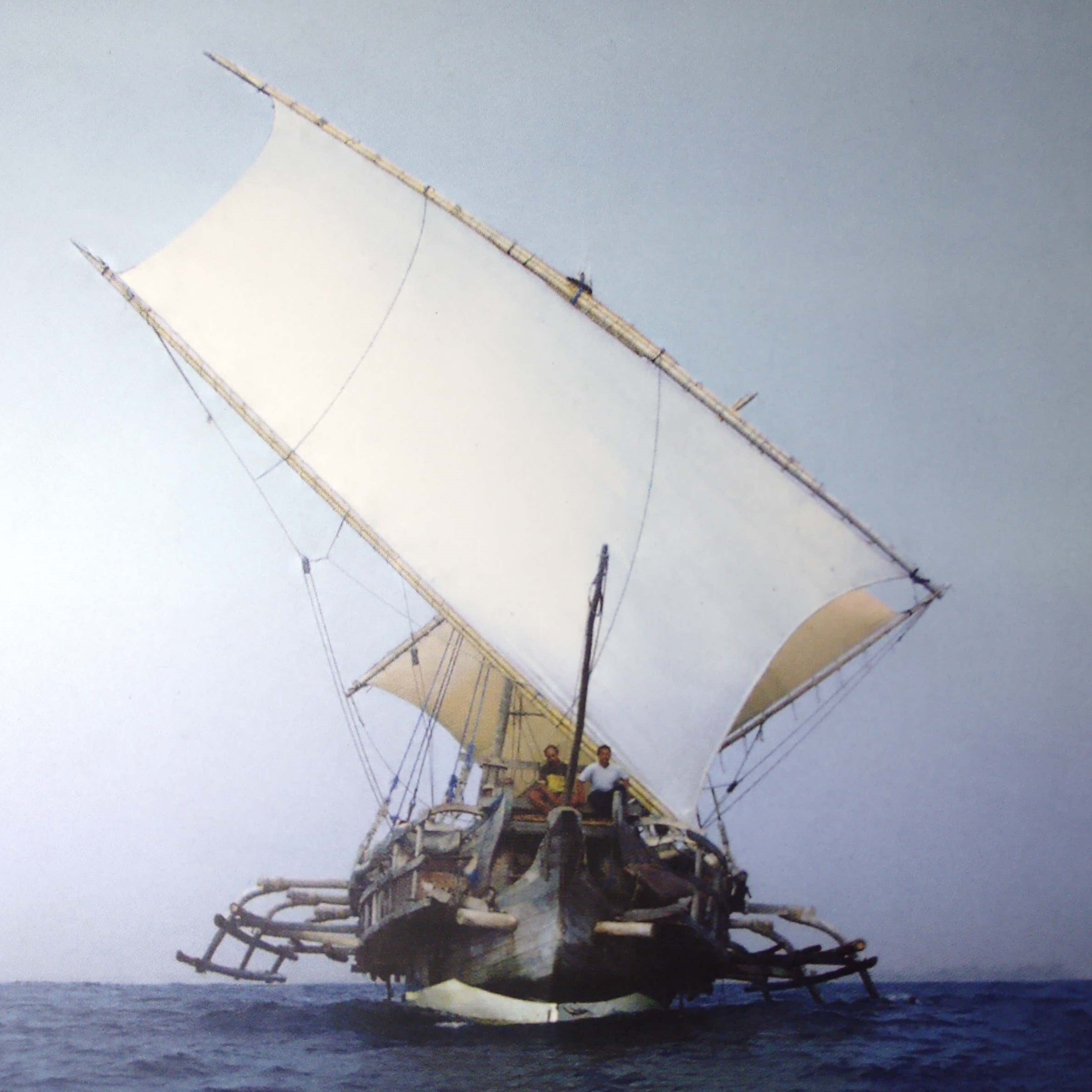
- Samudra Raksa viewed from the front

History
- Name: Samudra Raksa, Samudraraksa, Lallai Beke Ellau
- Launched: 2003

General characteristics
- Type: Replica ship
- Length: 19 metres (62.34 ft)
- Beam: 4.25 metres (13.94 ft)
- Draft: 1.5 metres (4.92 ft)
- Propulsion: Sails, paddles, and 2 × Dongjiong 22k outboard motor (22 PS (21.70 hp) each)
- Sail plan: Tanja sail. 3 sails on 2 vertical masts and 1 bowsprit.
- Speed: 9 knots (16.67 km/h)
- Notes: The engines are only used for maneuvering in the port

Samudra Raksa (Old Javanese: Defender of the seas) is a replica ship built in 2003 based on the relief of ships in the Borobudur temple. In the late 20th century, Philip Beale, a British sailor, became interested in depictions of the ship at Borobudur and decided to reconstruct one. Aided by government and international bodies, he organized an expedition team that constructed the ship and, from 2003 to 2004, sailed it from Indonesia to Madagascar and to Ghana, proving that long-distance trade could have occurred. The Samudra Raksa Museum was constructed at Borobudur Archeological Park to house the ship, opening in 2005, and provides other displays to interpret the ancient maritime history of Indonesians.

== Description ==
The keel is 17.29 m long and the hull is about 19 m overall with a beam of 4.25 m and moulded depth of 2.25 m. The sailing draft was approximately 1.5 m. The ship was propelled by two layar tanja (canted rectangular sails). The hull planking was bungor (sometimes called ‘benteak’) and decks were teak. The ship was not constructed with tall shields on the bow and stern like the reliefs because they obstructed the view to an extent that contravened Regulations for the Prevention of Collision at Sea.

The ship was named Lallai Beke Ellau (Bajo for "running with the sun") by its builder. The ship has 2 motors that are attached to the sides, their function is to maneuver when the boat is about to depart or when the boat is out of wind.

== Borobudur ship expedition ==
Based on archeological and other evidence, scholars have learned that the bas reliefs of Borobudur depict the everyday life of 8th-century ancient Java, from courtly palace life to that of commoners in the village. An array of temple, marketplace, architecture, flora and fauna, dress, jewelry and fashion are portrayed, as well as modes of transportation including palanquins, horse carriages and ships.

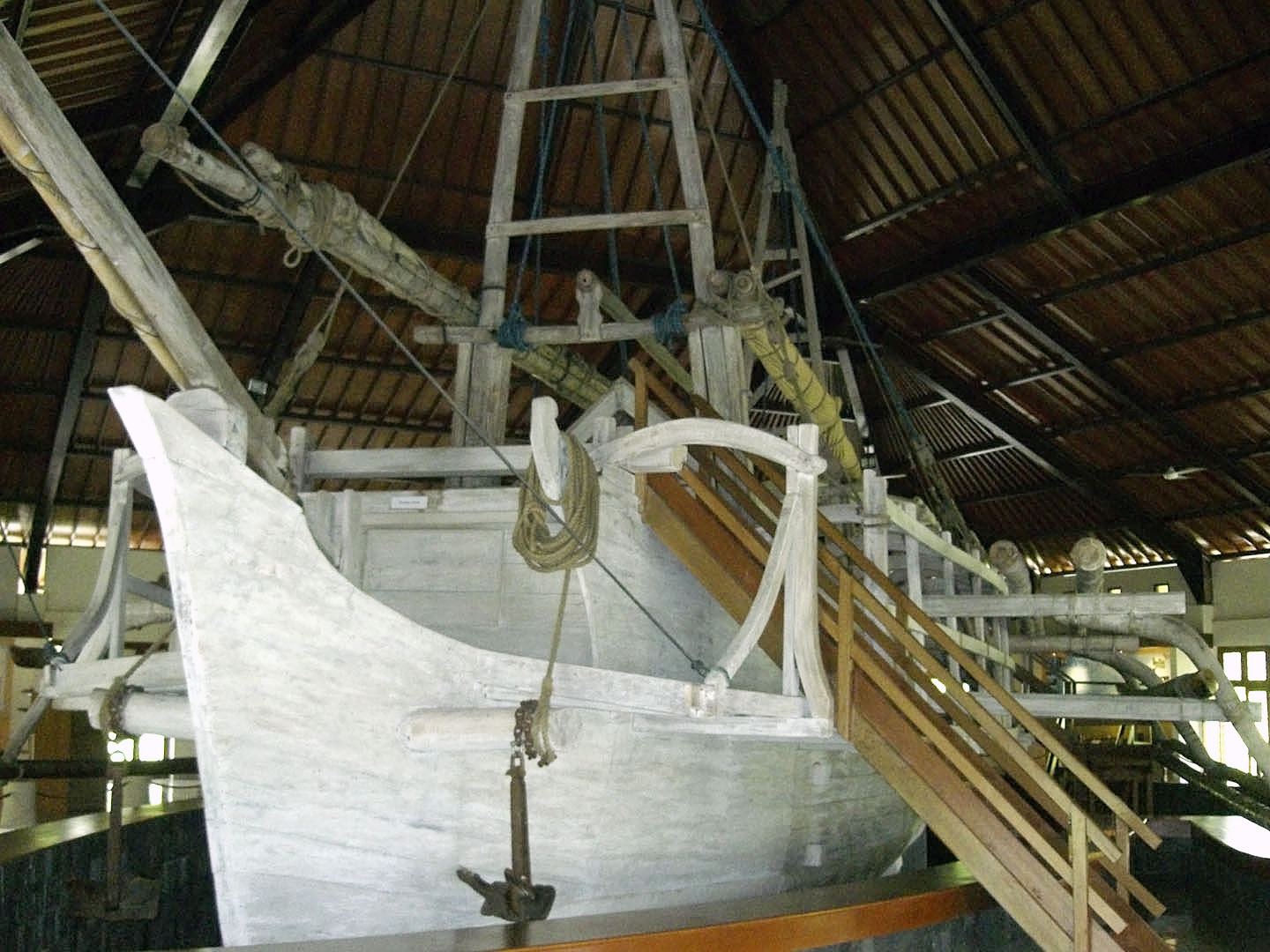
The reconstructed Borobudur ship as the centerpiece of Samudra Raksa Museum

In 1982, Philip Beale, a British sailor who previously served in the British Royal Navy, visited Borobudur to study traditional ships and marine traditions; he became fascinated with ten bas-relief images of ancient vessels depicted on Borobudur. He planned to reconstruct this ancient ship and to reenact the ancient maritime trade route. Working from very limited data—five stone carvings—but also his extensive naval experience, Beale organized an expedition team to reconstruct the ship and sail it from Jakarta in Indonesia to Madagascar, and then around the Cape of Good Hope to the west coast of Africa. He enlisted artisan experts and scholars in the effort.

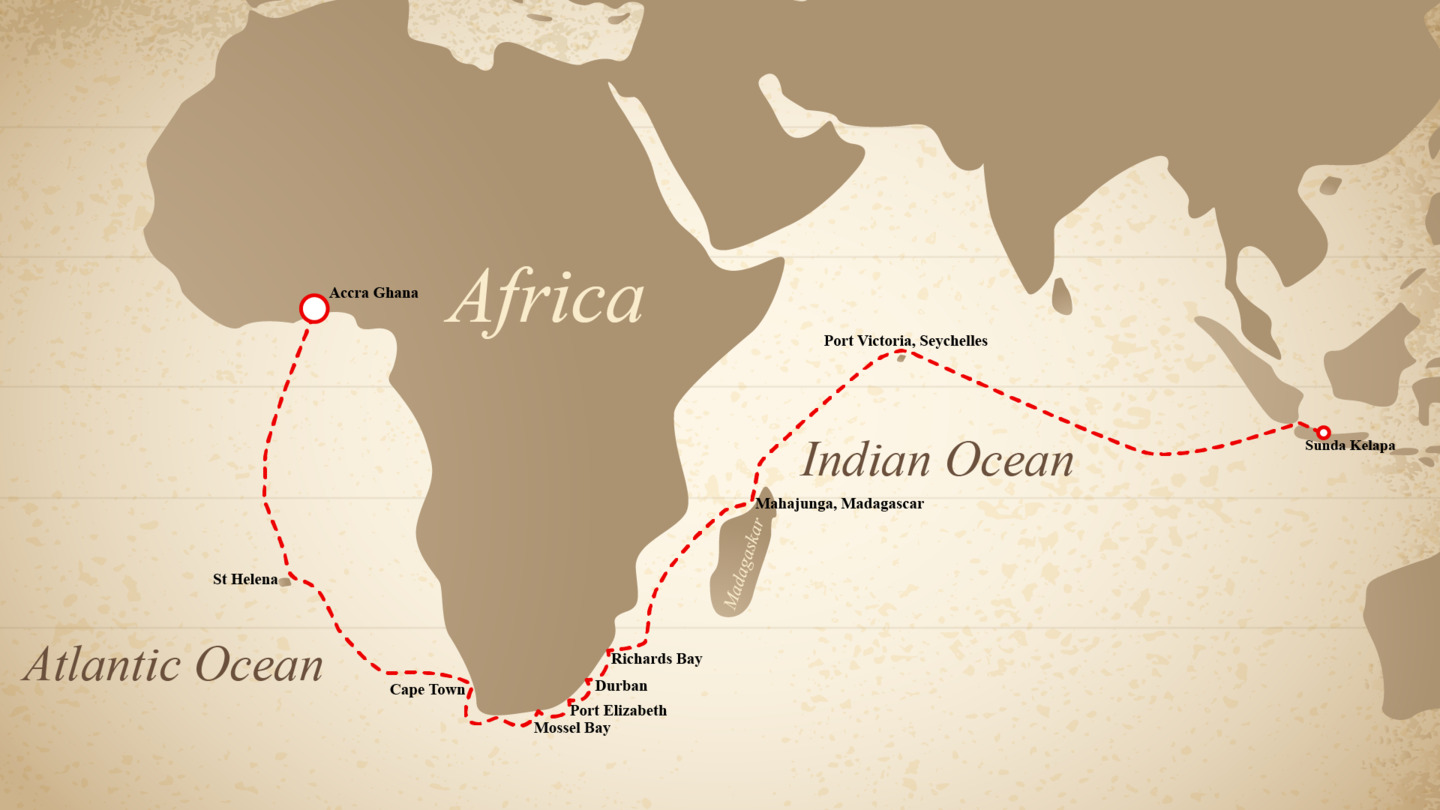
The expedition route.

Extensive research and design work preceded the building of the ship by a team of experienced Indonesian ship builders, based in the Kangean Islands some 60 miles north of Bali. Nick Burningham, an acknowledged expert on Indonesian watercraft and maritime archaeology, supervised the building of the vessel. The ship was built by Assad Abdullah al-Madani, a seasoned Indonesian traditional ship builder, and his men, with little more than a balsa wood model that Burningham had created to help him. The vessel is named Samudra Raksa (defender of the seas) and was inaugurated in Benoa Harbor, Bali on 15 July 2003 by the Minister for Tourism and Culture of the Republic of Indonesia, I Gede Ardika, together with Philippe Delanghe, UNESCO Office Jakarta Program Specialist for Culture.

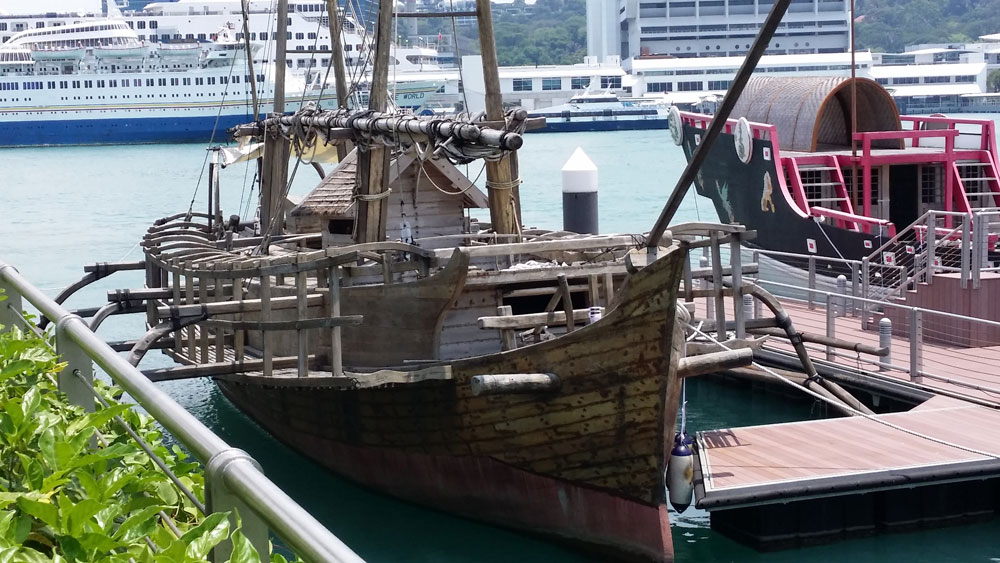
A replica of Indonesian Borobudur ship at Resorts World Sentosa, Singapore.

The expedition took place during the 6 months from August 2003 until February 2004. It started in Tanjung Priok harbour, Jakarta on 30 August 2003, launched by President Megawati Sukarnoputri, and arrived in the port of Tema, Accra, Ghana on 23 February 2004. The epic voyage demonstrated ancient trading links between Indonesia and Africa (in particular Madagascar and East Africa). Vessels traveled by what was historically called the "Cinnamon shipping route" from Indonesian waters across the Indian Ocean to the Seychelles, Madagascar, and then past South Africa to Ghana for trade.

Today the Samudra Raksa is housed and displayed in Samudra Raksa Museum, located a few hundred meters north of Borobudur temple within the complex of Borobudur Archaeological Park. The Ship Museum Samudra Raksa was opened by Coordinating Minister for Welfare, Prof. Dr. Alwi Shihab of the Republic of Indonesia, on 31 August 2005. It was a tribute to the crew and all who worked with and supported the Borobudur Ship Expedition.

== On stamps ==
In 2005, two stamps was released in commemoration of the expedition:

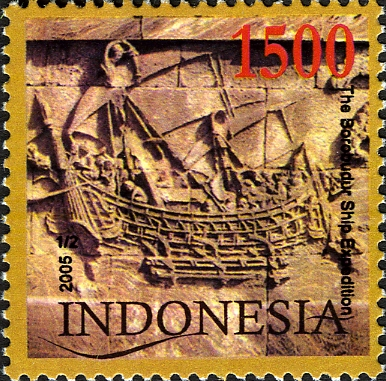

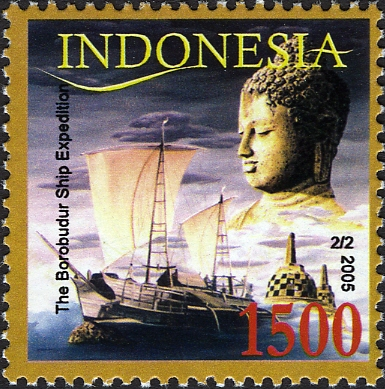

== See also ==
- Sarimanok, another replica of a Borobudur ship built in the Philippines in 1985

== Bibliography ==
- Beale, Philip (2006). "From Indonesia to Africa: Borobudur Ship Expedition" (PDF). ZIFF Journal. 3: 17–24. Archived from the original (PDF) on 2021-01-22.
- Burningham, Nick (2019). "Chapter 6: Shipping of the Indian Ocean World". In Schottenhammer, Angela (ed.). Early Global Interconnectivity across the Indian Ocean World, Volume II: Exchange of Ideas, Religions, and Technologies. Cham: Palgrave Macmillan. pp. 141–201.
- Pareanom, Yusi Avianto (2005). Jalur Kayu Manis, Ekspedisi Kapal Samudraraksa Borobudur. Yogyakarta: Kementerian Kebudayaan dan Pariwisata.
