= Danielle Eubank =

American painter

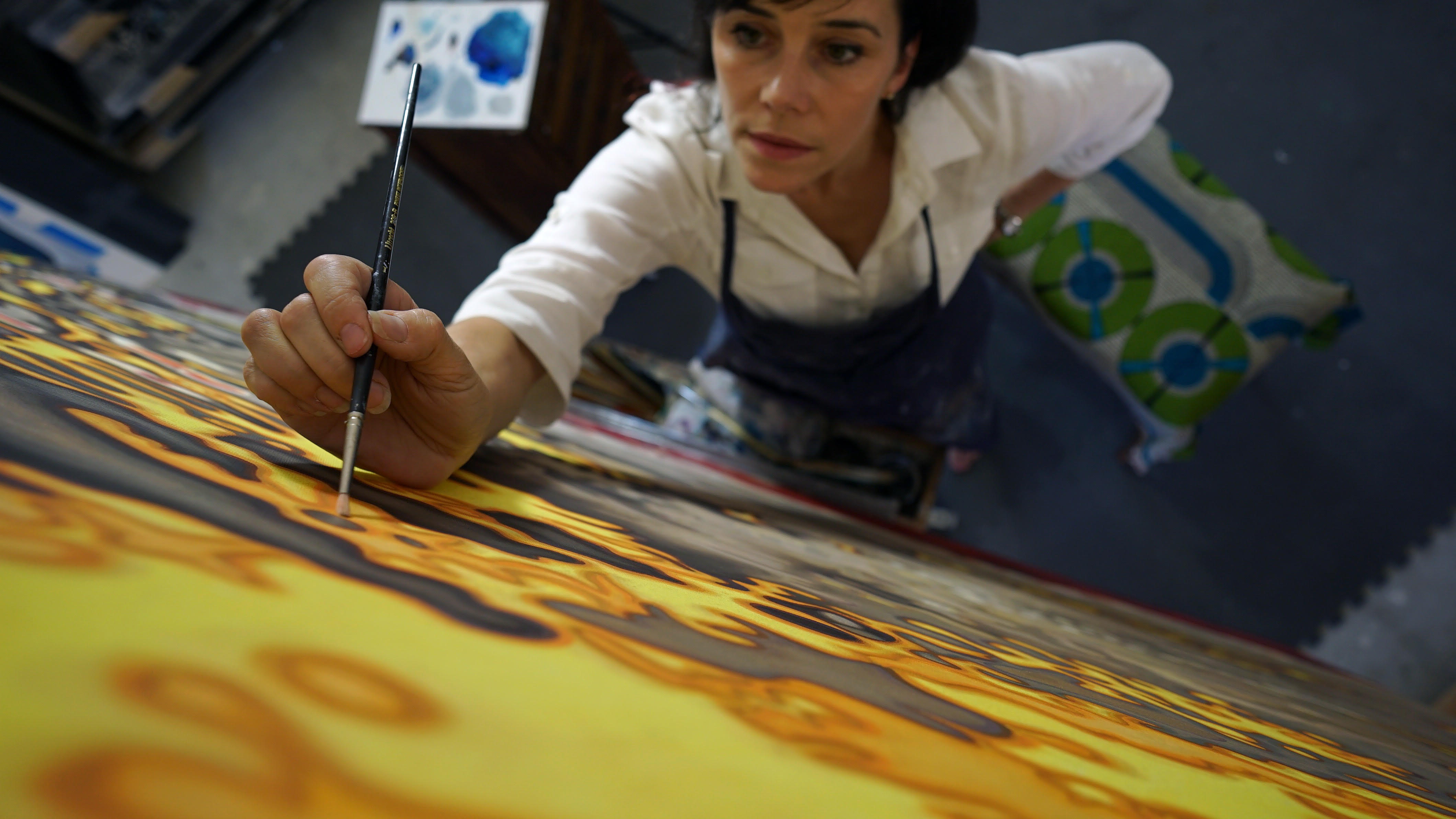
- Eubank painting in her studio
- Born: August 31, 1968 (age 57); Northern California
- Education: University of California, Los Angeles
- Occupations: Oil painter, expedition artist
- Known for: Painting, waterscapes, seascapes, One Artist Five Oceans, expedition art
- Notable work: Mozambique IX, Arctic XI, Arctic X, Isle of Mull, Phoenicia Reflection III, South Africa
- Awards: Pollock-Krasner Foundation Grant

Danielle Eubank is an American oil painter and expedition artist with a studio in Los Angeles, known for her paintings of bodies of water, as well as One Artist Five Oceans, in which she sailed and painted all of the world's oceans to raise awareness about climate change. All her artwork is done in an environmentally responsible manner, with high quality environmentally friendly materials. She was a recipient of the Pollock-Krasner Foundation Grant in 2014–2015.

As an Expedition Artist, Eubank has participated in the Phoenician Ship Expedition, The Borobudur Ship Expedition, an expedition to the High Arctic, and an expedition to Antarctica.

Eubank was commissioned by Standard Chartered Bank to produce a portrait for their London headquarters. The painting was part of an international traveling show before it was displayed in the London office. Eubank also painted the portrait of General Sir Peter de la Billère that hangs in the London Naval and Military Club.

Eubank worked as a designer in the early days of interactivity. She was an interactive designer for pioneers in the interactive field including the Voyager Company, Robert Abel and Associates, Microsoft, and the BBC Multimedia Centre.

Eubank holds a Master of Fine Arts from the University of California, Los Angeles (UCLA) and is married to composer Fletcher Beasley.

== Expeditions ==
=== The Borobudur Ship Expedition (2003-2004) ===
Danielle was the Expedition Artist with The UNESCO approved Borobudur Ship Expedition, an international expedition originally conceived by Briton Philip Beale and launched by the President of Indonesia on August 15, 2003. The ship sailed from Indonesia to Seychelles, Madagascar, South Africa, and the expedition culminated in Ghana. The ship, a replica of an 8th-century trading vessel based on carvings found on the Borobudur temple, travelled a total of 10,000 miles, the expedition ended on February 23, 2004. During the expedition, Eubank produced over 100 paintings and photographs, which were presented as a solo exhibition in central London. In addition to her role as Expedition Artist, she was the official advance liaison with legations in each country including the legations for Indonesia, the United Kingdom, the United States, and the countries visited.

=== Bali (2005) ===
In 2005, a group of five patrons sent Eubank to the island of Bali to create a series of 20 paintings. She was based in Ubud, for 3 months.

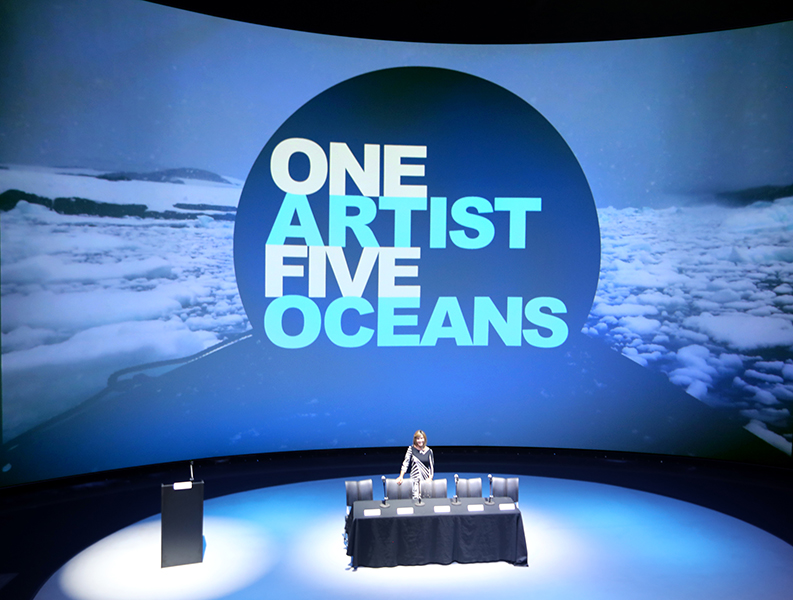
Danielle Eubank on stage

=== The Phoenician Ship Expedition (2008-2010) ===
Eubank was an expedition artist and crew member on the Phoenician Ship Expedition, a re-creation of 600 BCE Phoenician vessel that sailed 20,000 miles over 2 years, the second of Eubank's expeditions with Philip Beale. The Phoenician Ship Expedition departed from Arwad, Syria in August 2008, sailed through the Suez Canal, around the Horn of Africa and down the east coast. The voyage continued up the west coast of Africa, through the Straights of Gibraltar and across the Mediterranean, returning to Syria in November 2010. Eubank's experience on the ship has been covered by publications such as the Los Angeles Times, LA Weekly and UCLA Magazine. Thompson's Gallery in central London hosted Eubank's 2011 solo show as an expedition artist.

=== The Arctic Circle (2014) ===
In 2014, Eubank joined The Arctic Circle, an expeditionary program that puts artists and scientists together to explore the High Arctic. Eubank was one of 27 artists and scientists on board the Antigua, a three-masted barquentine tall ship. The ship sailed through the international territory of Svalbard, an arctic archipelago north of Norway. Eubank sailed only 10 degrees latitude from the North Pole, documenting climate change and its effects on the ocean.

=== The Southern Ocean (2019) ===
Eubank sailed from Ushuaia, Argentina, across the Drake Passage, and as far south as Detaille Island, which took her across the Antarctic Circle. Eubank crossed the Neumayer Channel and Gerlache Straight, arriving at Melchior Islands, crossing the Drake Passage for a second time, and returning to Ushuaia. Eubank's expedition to the Antarctic Circle ended her 20-year quest to paint all the world's oceans.

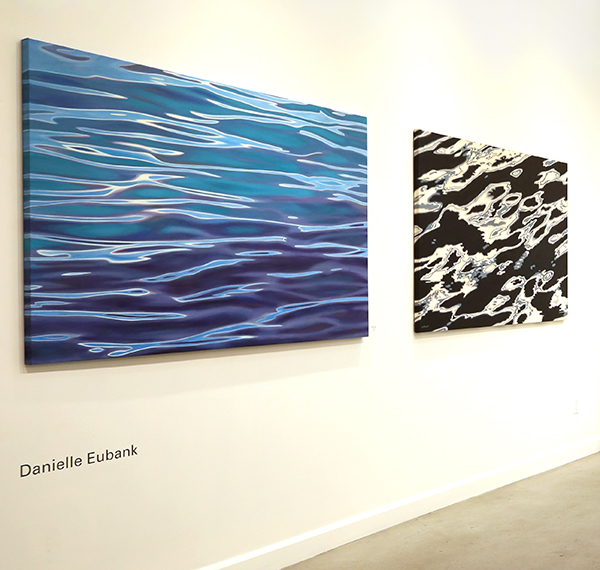
Oil on linen paintings of Antarctica by Danielle Eubank

=== One Artist Five Oceans (2001-2021) ===
One Artist Five Oceans was a 20-year project in which Eubank sailed and painted the waters of every ocean on Earth to raise awareness about climate change. Her paintings of water led to an invitation to serve as the expedition artist on the Borobudur Ship Expedition in 2004, which sailed from Indonesia to Ghana. The success of these paintings led her to paint the other oceans of the worlds, next circumnavigating Africa on a replica of a 2,500 year old Phoenician ship. She sailed and painted the High Arctic and travelled to the northernmost settlement on earth. One Artist Five Oceans ended with a 2019 Antarctic expedition to paint the Southern Ocean. Eubank sailed over 30,000 miles, painting more than 200 bodies of water across 22 countries.

== Commissions ==
- Standard Chartered Bank commissioned Eubank to produce a portrait for its new headquarters in London. The painting was part of an international traveling show before it is hung in the London office.
- Eubank painted the portrait of General Sir Peter de la Billière that hangs in the Naval and Military Club in London

== Grants and awards ==
WCA/United Nations Program Honor Roll Award, NY USA (2019)

The Human Impacts Institute 2018 Creative Climate Awards Nomination, NY USA

Pollock-Krasner Foundation Grant, Pollock-Krasner Foundation, New York, NY USA (2014)

== Notable exhibitions ==
- Ocean Resiliency: The Expeditions of Danielle Eubank, Aquarium of the Pacific, Long Beach CA USA (2019-2020)
- Danielle Eubank | One Artist Five Oceans, California Lutheran University, Thousand Oaks, CA USA (2019)
- One Artist Five Oceans, C Gallery Fine Art, Long Beach, CA USA (2018)
- Water Works, Channel Islands Maritime Museum, Oxnard, CA USA (2018)
- Up the Creek, West LA College, Culver City, CA USA (2017)
- Eco-Art: An Exhibition, Golden West College Art Gallery, Huntington Beach CA USA (2017)
- The Ocean of Memories, Taiwan Academy, Westwood, CA USA (2017)
- Daily Life in Ancient Lebanon, Oriental Museum at Durham University, Durham, UK (2016)
- Smaller Footprints, Museum of Art and History, Lancaster, CA USA (2016)
- Balance Unbalance Conference, “Water Imbalance” Co-curator, exhibition theme creator, and artist, Arizona State University, Tempe, AZ USA (2015)
- Okinawa, Muhammad Ali Center Museum, Louisville, KT USA (2014)
- Half the Sky: Intersections of Social Practice Art, LuXun Academy of Fine Arts, Shenyang, China (2014)
- Danielle Eubank, The Ebell of Los Angeles, Los Angeles, CA USA (2012)
- Phoenicia, Thompson's Gallery, London, UK (2011)
- Oil on Water, Found Gallery, Los Angeles, CA USA (2009)
- Danielle Eubank, Thompson's Gallery, London, UK (2007)
- Borobudur Ship Expedition, Thompson's Gallery, London, UK (2004)

== In the media ==
- "'It's Something Very Precious': Painting Oceans to Showcase Climate Change" The Guardian (January 2019)
- "Exploring Water and the Environment Through Painting" SHEI Magazine (December 2019)
- "New Exhibition On South Coast Highlights Painter's Odyssey To Document All Five Oceans Around World" KCLU (June 2019)
- "One Artist, Five Oceans" Fine Art Connoisseur (June 2019)
- "Painting the Oceans: All of Them" Artists and Climate Change (June 2019)
- "Painting the Antarctic Ocean With Danielle Eubank" Speak Up For Blue (February 2019)
- "Meet an Artist Monday: Danielle Eubank" LA Weekly (November 2018)
- "One Artist Five Oceans: Danielle Eubank Prepares for a Landmark Voyage" Installation Magazine (November 2018)
- "2018 Creative Climate Awards" The Center For Sustainable Practice in the Arts (September 2018)
- "Danielle Eubank's Arctic Circle Expedition, Part Two" Huffington Post (January 2015)
- "Expedition Painter Danielle Eubank’s Body of Water Works" Artbound (September 2014)
- "A Conversation with Danielle Eubank, Expedition Artist, On Her Upcoming trip to the Arctic Circle" Huffington Post (August 2014)
- "What To Cook On a 2,500 Year Old Boat Part 2" La Weekly (November 2010)
- "What To Cook On a 2,500 Year Old Boat Part 1", LA Weekly (November 2010)
- "How Green is Your Painting? Thoughts on Cleaner Art" Daily News (November 2010)
- "Daily Dose Pick: Danielle Eubank" Flavorwire (August 2010)
- "Art & Ancient Mariners", UCLA Magazine (July 2010)
- "Web Connects Students With Distant Voyagers" (March 2010)
- "Painting Through Pirate Waters", LA Weekly (January 2009)
- "On a Voyage of Artistic Discovery", Los Angeles Times (August 2008)
- "Africa Draws Artist" Daily News (July 2008)
- "Formal Elegance and Multi-Modal Command Objects" Siggraph Visual Proceedings (1993)
