= Lancang =

Lancang may refer to:

- Lancang River, in China, upper half of Mekong River
- Lancang County, in Yunnan, China
- Lancang (ship), a sailing ship from the Malay Archipelago
- Lancang train, Laos Railways variant of China Railway CR200J
