= Lancha =

Lancha can refer to:

- Launch (boat), an open motorboat. Also spelled lantsa in the Philippines.
- Lancang (ship), a sailing ship from the Malay Archipelago
