= Theory of Phoenician discovery of the Americas =

Archaeological theory

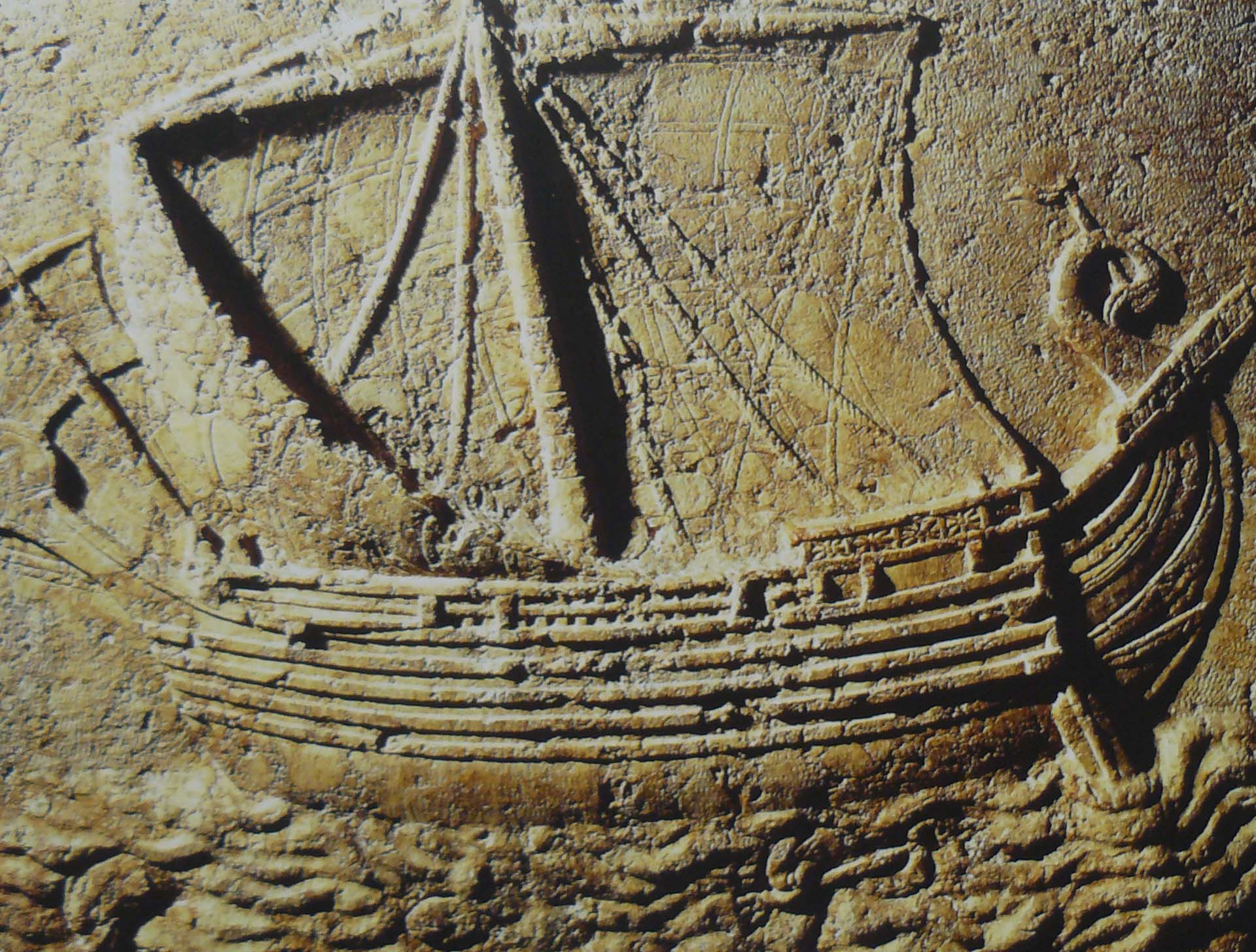
The Ship Sarcophagus: a Phoenician ship carved on a sarcophagus, 2nd century AD.

The theory of Phoenician discovery of the Americas suggests that the earliest Old World contact with the Americas was not with Columbus or Norse settlers, but with the Phoenicians (or, alternatively, other Semitic peoples) in the first millennium BC.

== Background ==
The Sargasso Sea may have been known to earlier mariners, as the poem Ora Maritima by the late 4th-century author Rufus Festus Avienius describes a portion of the Atlantic as being covered with seaweed, citing a now-lost account by 5th-century BC Carthaginian navigator Himilco.

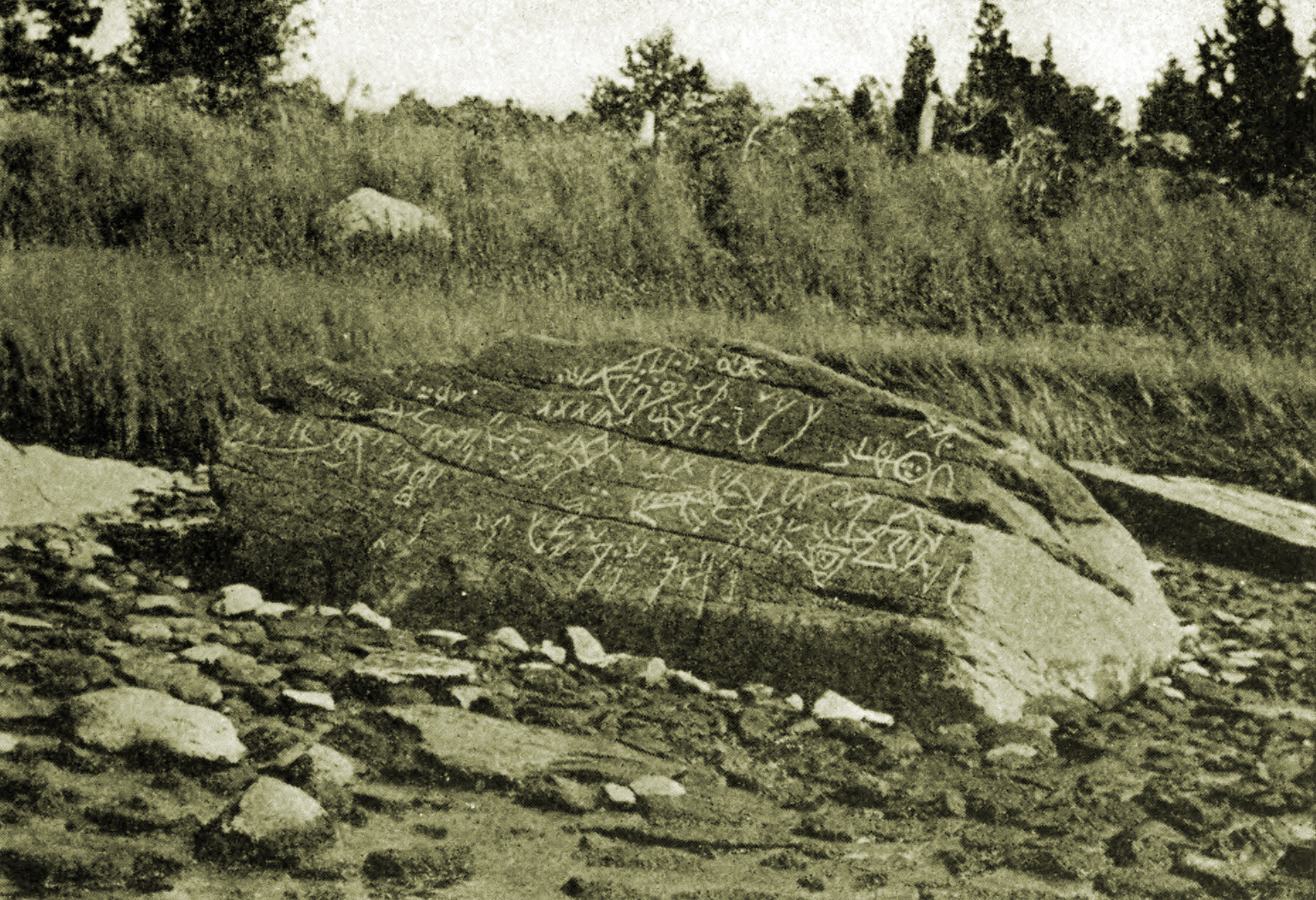
The petroglyphs on Dighton Rock

In the late 18th century, a number of people speculated on the origins of the petroglyphs on Dighton Rock in Berkley, Massachusetts. Ezra Stiles, then president of Yale College, believed them to be Hebrew. Antoine Court de Gébelin argues in Le Monde primitif ("The primeval World") that they commemorated an ancient visit to the East Coast by a group of sailors from Carthage (modern-day Tunisia).

In the 19th century, belief in an Israelite visit to the Americas became a part of Mormonism. Ross T. Christensen has propounded the theory that the Mulekites in the Book of Mormon were "largely Phoenician in their ethnic origin."

In his 1871 book Ancient America, John Denison Baldwin repeats some of the arguments given for Phoenician visits to America. Baldwin ultimately refutes them, saying:

if it were true that the civilization found in Mexico and Central America came from people of the Phoenician race, it would be true also that they built in America as they never built any where else, that they established a language here radically unlike their own, and that they used a style of writing totally different from that which they carried into every other region occupied by their colonies. All the forms of alphabetical writing used at present in Europe and Southwestern Asia came directly or indirectly from that anciently invented by the race to which the Phoenicians belonged, and they have traces of a common relationship which can easily be detected. Now the writing of the inscriptions at Palenque, Copan, and elsewhere in the ruins has no more relatedness to the Phoenician than to the Chinese writing. It has not a single characteristic that can be called Phoenician any more than the language of the inscriptions or the style of architecture with which it is associated; therefore we can not reasonably suppose this American civilization was originated by people of the Phoenician race.

== Alleged artifacts ==
In 1872, a stone inscribed with Phoenician writing was allegedly discovered in Paraíba, Brazil. It tells of a Phoenician ship which, due to a storm, was separated from a fleet sailing from Egypt around Africa; it also mentions the pharaoh Necho I or Necho II. A transcription was shown to Ladislau de Souza Mello Netto, director of the National Museum of Brazil. Netto first accepted the inscription as genuine, but by 1873, philologist Ernest Renan convinced him that it was a forgery. Its letter forms vary from those that occurred and disappeared over a span of 800 years; such confluence in a single piece of writing implies that it was a forgery. No scholar ever saw the stone or located its source and, during 1873–74, Netto tried and failed to find the individual who had supplied the copy of the inscription. In the 1960s, Cyrus H. Gordon provided a new translation, and stated his conclusion that it was genuine, since it didn't copy any Semitic writing that would have been widely accessible at the time. Frank Moore Cross disagreed, saying that "Everything in the inscription was available to the forger in nineteenth century handbooks or from uninspired guesses based on these easily available sources," and clarified that the letter forms cover a range of ten centuries.

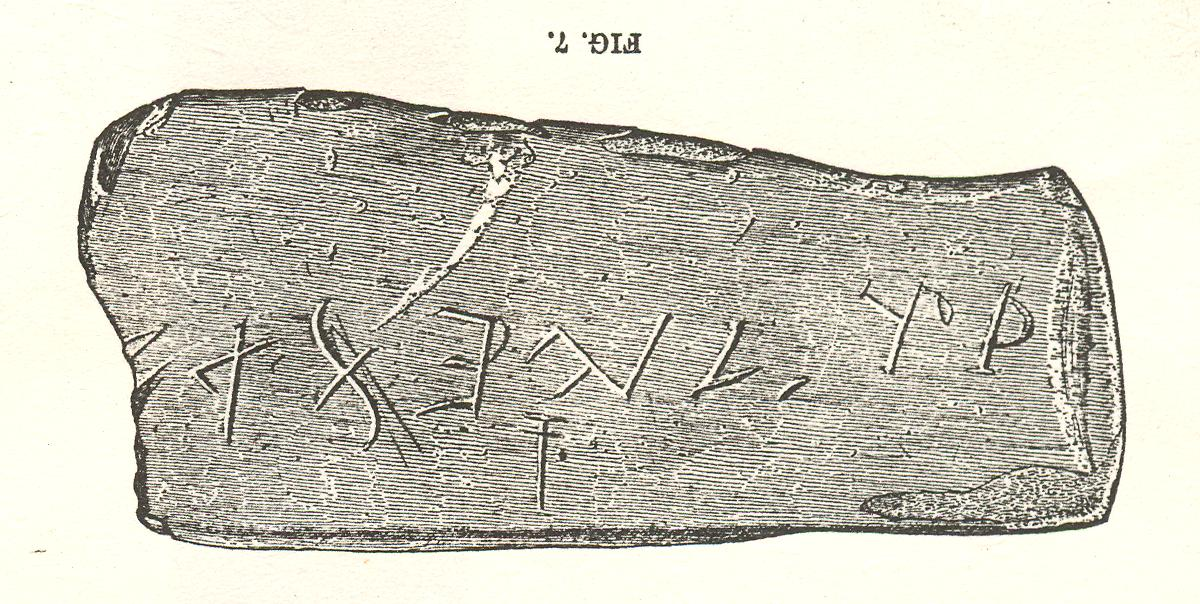
Lithograph of the Bat Creek inscription, which Cyrus H. Gordon believed to be Phoenician

Gordon also believed that ancient Hebrew inscriptions had been found at two sites in the southeastern United States, indicating that Jews had arrived there before Columbus. One of these supposed finds was the Bat Creek inscription which Gordon believed to be Phoenician; it is now considered to be a hoax. Another find which has been claimed as supporting the theory of Semitic discovery of the Americas is the Los Lunas Decalogue Stone, which has also been dismissed as a fake.

== Modern theories ==
In the 20th century, adherents have included Cyrus H. Gordon, John Philip Cohane, Ross T. Christensen, Barry Fell and Mark McMenamin.

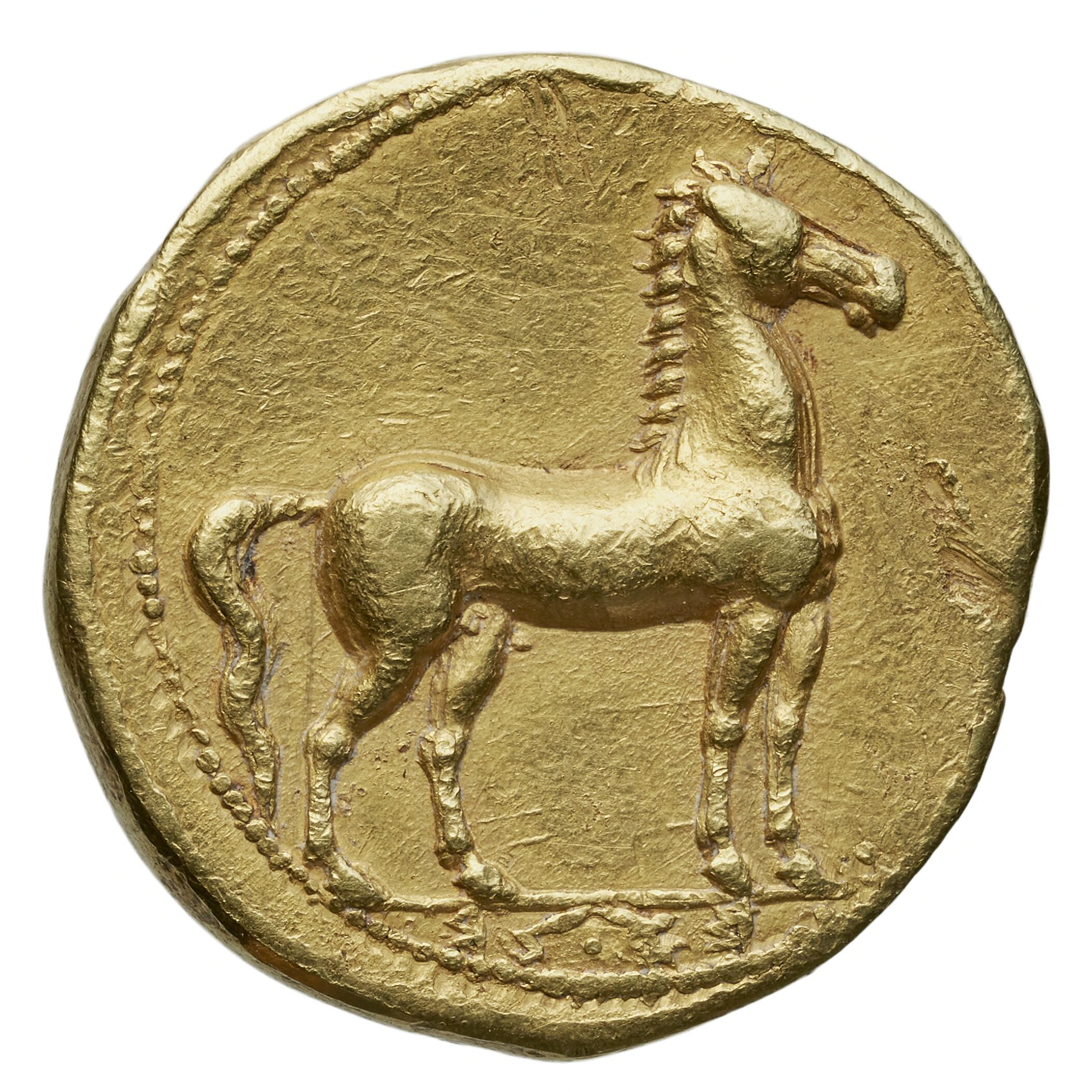
Sample of the design of the reverse side of a stater coin, which purportedly presents evidence of a map of the Mediterranean, Europe and the Americas below the horse.

In 1996, McMenamin proposed that Phoenician sailors discovered the New World c. 350 BC. Carthage minted gold staters in 350 BC bearing a pattern in the reverse exergue of the coins, which McMenamin interpreted as a map of the Mediterranean with the Americas shown to the west across the Atlantic. As of 2024, McMenamin still holds to his hypothesis that these gold staters represent images of the New World, as a second specimen of the critical Jenkins-Lewis JL#11 stater has surfaced with an exergue map pattern identical to that seen in the British Museum specimen. Later McMenamin demonstrated that the Farley coins found in America were modern forgeries but these Farley coins are not related to the gold staters with the world map.

Lucio Russo has speculated about a probable arrival of Phoenicians in the Americas in his philologic analyses of Ptolemy's Geography. In his book, Ptolemy gives the coordinates of the Fortunate Isles but at the same time he shrinks the size of the world by one third compared to the size measured by Eratosthenes. Russo observes that by attributing those coordinates to the Antilles, the world gets back to the right size, the geographical description given by Ptolemy fits much better and certain puzzling deformations in Ptolemy's world map disappear. Russo argues that the Antilles coordinates must have been known to Ptolemy's source, Hipparchus. Hipparchus lived in Rhodes and may have gotten this information from Phoenician sailors, since they had full control of the western Mediterranean in those times.

In 2019, the Phoenician Ship Expedition by Philip Beale used a replica of an ancient Phoenician ship to sail from Carthage, Tunisia to Santo Domingo intending to demonstrate the possibility of an ancient voyage.

== Scholarly assessment ==
Marshall B. McKusick, Professor of Anthropology at the University of Iowa and former Iowa state archaeologist, reviewed and dismissed various theories of Phoenicians or Canaanites in the New World; he observed that "in this modern day everyone wishes to be his own authority, and the personal search for cultural alternatives seems to make every idea or theory equal in value."

Glenn Markoe says that it will "probably never be known" whether the Phoenicians ever reached the Americas. He remarks,

Proof in the form of an inscription, like the celebrated Phoenician text allegedly found in Paraíba in northern Brazil, remains unlikely. The latter, which recounts the landing of a storm-driven party from Sidon, has long been recognized as a clever forgery. If such a fateful expedition had actually occurred, the proof is more likely to be found in a handful of Phoenician pottery shards.

Ronald H. Fritze discusses the history of such claims from the 17th to the 20th centuries. He concludes that, although technically possible,

... no archaeological evidence has yet been discovered to prove the contentions of Irwin, Gordon, Bailey, Fell and others. Since even the fleeting Norse presence in Vinland left definite archaeological remains at L’Anse aux Meadows in Newfoundland, it seems logical that the allegedly more extensive Phoenician and Carthaginian presence would have left similar evidence. The absence of such remains is strong circumstantial evidence that the Phoenicians and Carthaginians never reached the Americas.

== See also ==
- Atlantis
- Pedra da Gávea
- Pre-Columbian trans-oceanic contact theories
- Thor Heyerdahl#Boats Ra and Ra II
- Carthaginian coins of Corvo
