= Philip Beale =

British sailor, adventurer and entrepreneur

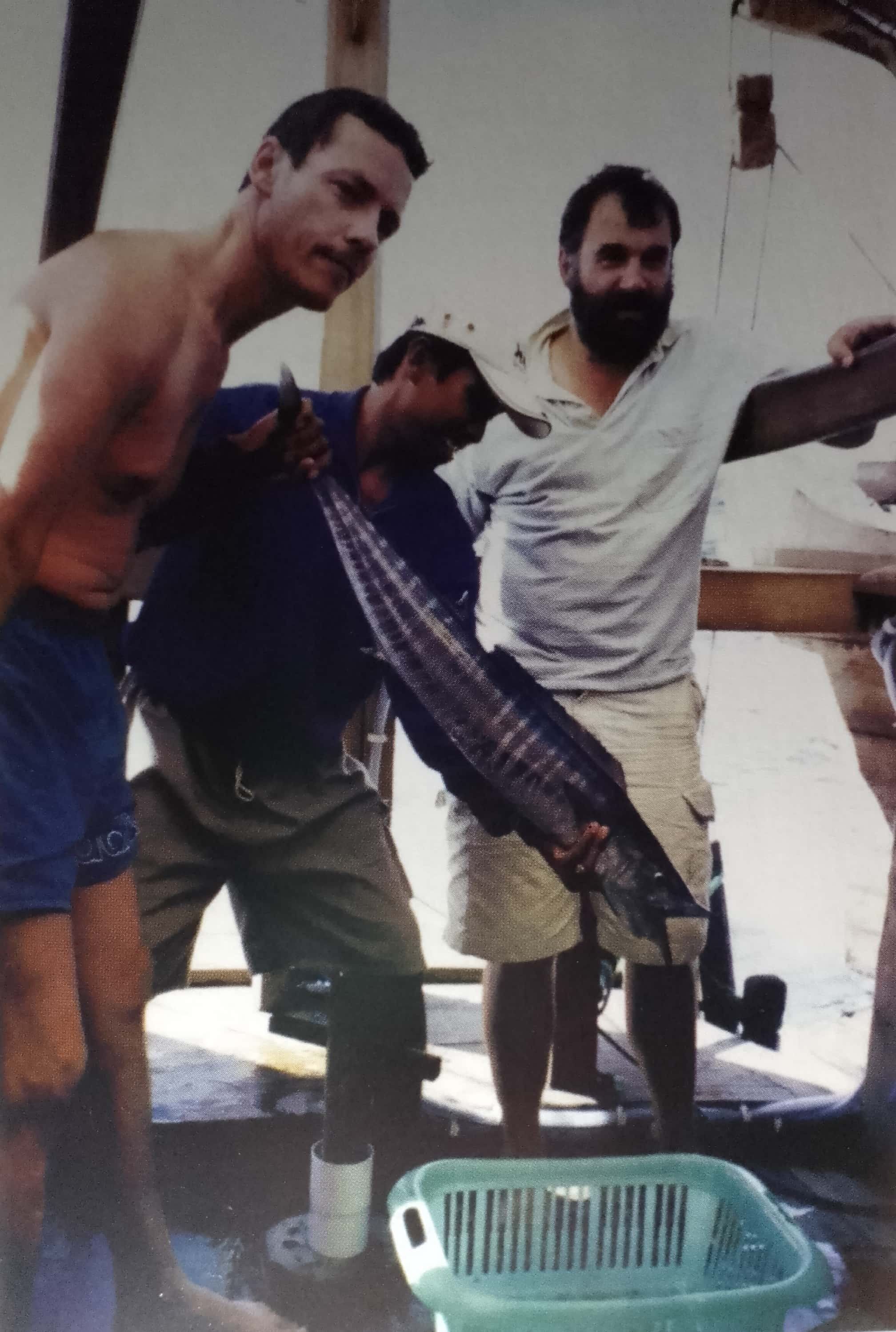
Beale (right, white shirt) on the Samudra Raksa.

Phillip Beale is a British sailor, adventurer, expedition leader and entrepreneur. He led the Borobudur Ship Expedition and the 2008–2010 Phoenician Expedition.

Beale has a BA Honours degree in Politics from the University of Hull and began his career in the Royal Navy. He is a qualified MCA RYA Yachtmaster, a member of the Naval and Military Club and The Royal Yachting Association.

Beale became interested in depictions of a Borobudur ship that he had seen on the Borobudur Temple terraces in Indonesia. He became interested in the fact that the carvings, which had been completed c. AD 825, depicted ships that may have sailed southwest from Indonesia to West Africa. He decided to reconstruct one and sail it to West Africa to prove that Indonesian seafarers could have reached West Africa on water as well as by land.

The ship that Beale constructed was called Samudra Raksa, which means "guardian of the sea". It was 19 metres long. Beale led the expedition which became known as the Borobudur Ship Expedition in 2003 with 15 crew and sailed Samudra Raksa to West Africa, arriving in 2004.

Between 2008 and 2010, Beale led the Phoenician Ship Expedition to recreate the first route taken by Phoenician mariners in 600 BC. The objective of this expedition was to prove that ships built by the ancient Phoenicians could withstand the conditions around the African coastline.

On 28 September 2019, Beale launched the Phoenicians Before Columbus Expedition, a successful attempt to demonstrate that the Phoenicians could have crossed the Atlantic Ocean long before Christopher Columbus.
