= Borobudur ship =

8th-century sailing vessel depicted in bas reliefs of Borobudur, Java, Indonesia

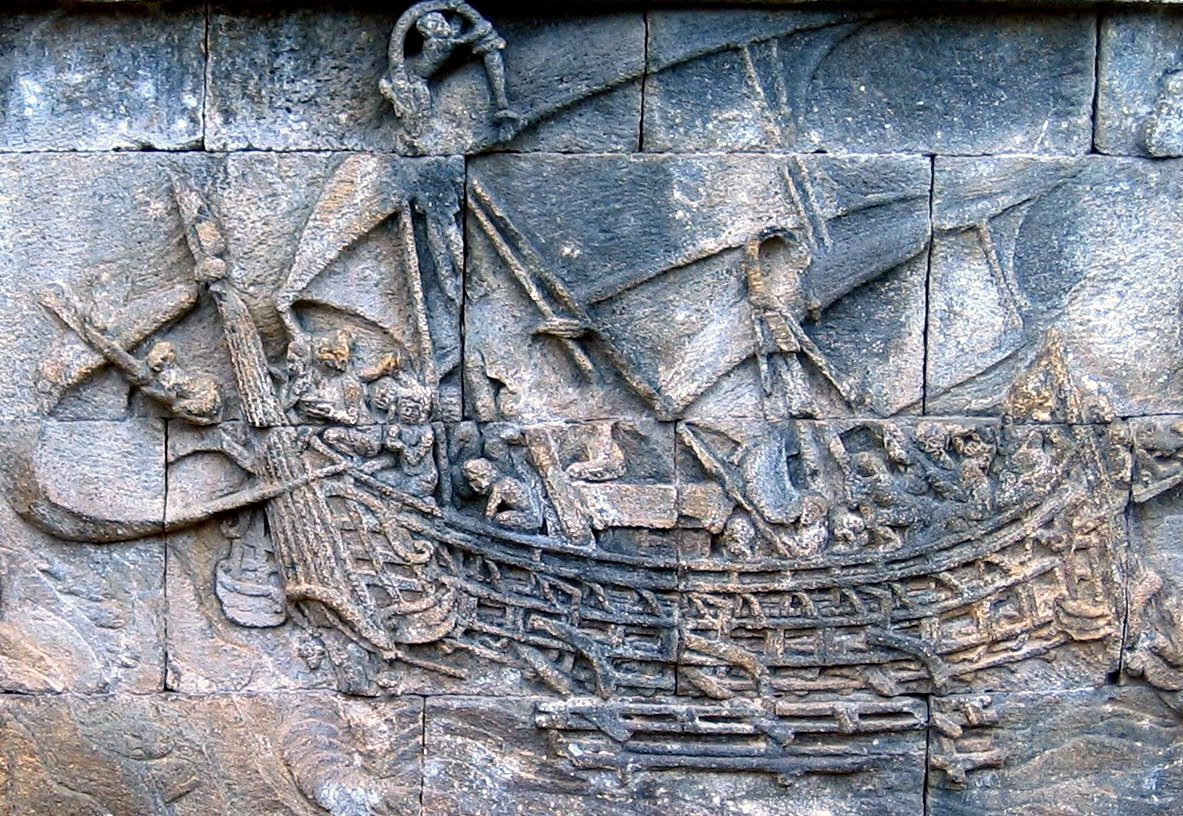
The image of a ship on Borobudur bas relief

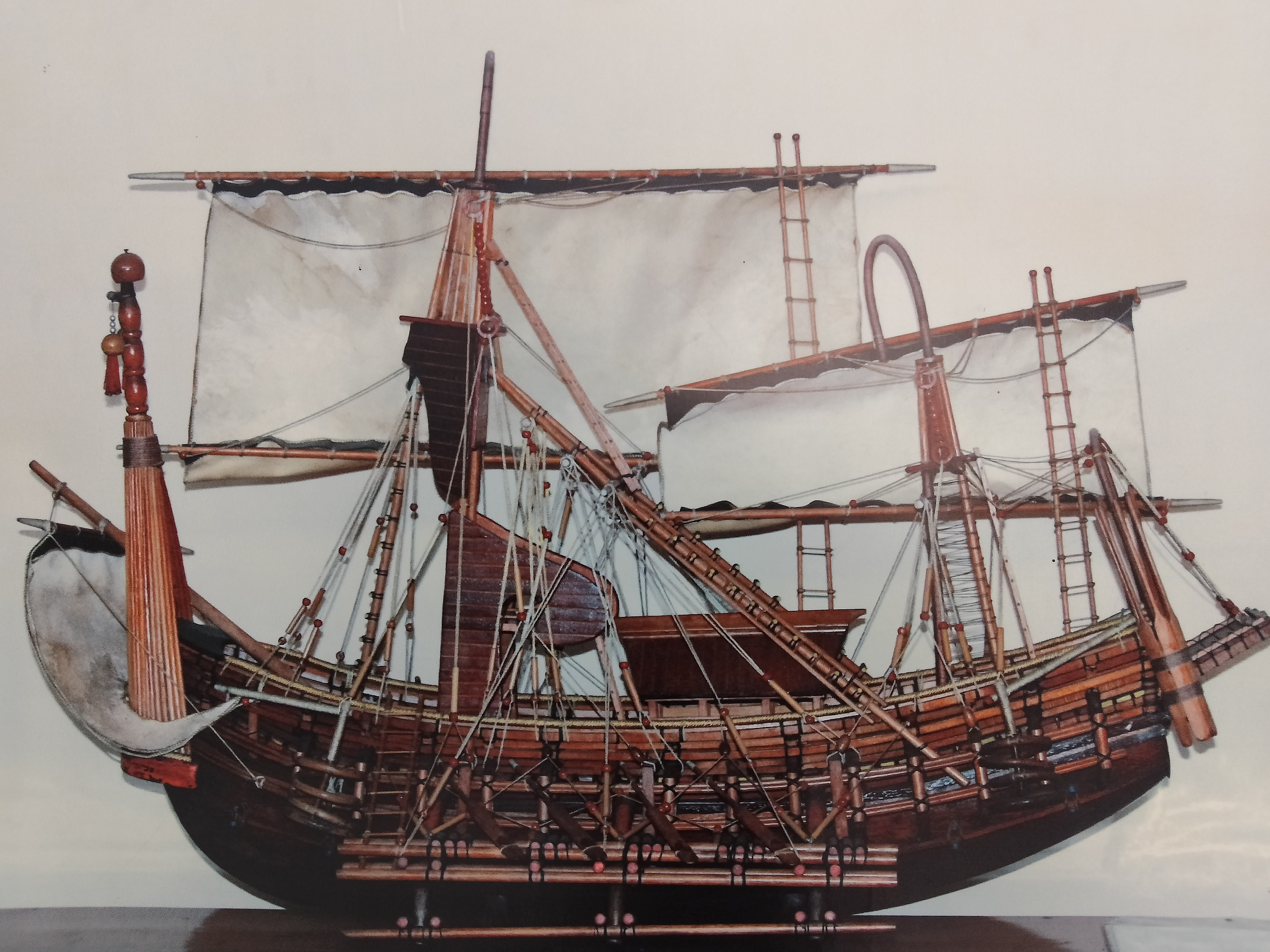
A miniature replica of Borobudur ship, Jakarta Maritime Museum collection

A Borobudur ship is an 8th to 9th-century wooden double outrigger sailing vessel of Maritime Southeast Asia, depicted in some bas-reliefs of the Borobudur Buddhist monument in Central Java, Indonesia. It is a ship of the Javanese people, and derivative vessels of similar size continued to be used in East Java coastal trade at least until the 1940s.

== Characteristics ==
The characteristics of the ships of the Borobudur temple include: Having outriggers that are not as long as their hulls, bipod or tripod mast with a canted square sail (tanja sail), a bowsprit with a spritsail, rowing gallery (where people row by sitting or standing), deckhouse, have oculi (carved/bossed eyes), and quarter rudders. Some ships are depicted with oars, numbering at least 6, 8, or 9, and some others have none.

== Misconceptions ==
There are several misunderstandings about the true identity of the ships carved at Borobudur. One of the earliest misconceptions was that the ship depicted in the carving was an Indian ship. This opinion is supported by Indian and Dutch scholars who attribute the influence of India to the kingdoms of the Nusantara Archipelago ("Indianization"), so the ship depicted in the temple must have come from India. This also stems from the notion that Javanese ships are inferior to Indian ships. However, more recent scholarship holds that the Javanese were experienced navigators and built large ships as early as the first millennium CE (see kolandiaphonta). The characteristics actually indicate Austronesian origin: The presence of outriggers, the use of canted sails with a lower boom, the use of bipod and tripod mast, and rowing galleries.

The second opinion states that this ship may be a ship from Srivijaya or Malay. There is absolutely no evidence to support this statement. Epigraphical records of Srivijaya rarely recorded the types of watercraft, the type of Malay boat recorded is the samvau (modern Malay: Sampan) on the Kedukan Bukit inscription (683 AD) in Sumatra. Another recorded watercraft is the lancang, from 2 inscriptions on the northern coast of Bali written in the Old Balinese language dated 896 and 923 AD. Meanwhile, the Borobudur ship is only found in the Borobudur temple, which is a Javanese heritage, not Sumatran or Malay. Lastly, and most commonly believed, is the assumption that the Borobudur ship was a Majapahit ship. In fact, historical accounts of the main ships of Majapahit mention the jong, malangbang, and kelulus, all of which do not have outriggers.

== Plate renderings ==
Renderings of the five ships with outriggers in the Borobudur bas-reliefs (out of seven ships depicted in total) in Conradus Leemans's Boro-Boedoer (1873). Note that the ships are of different types.

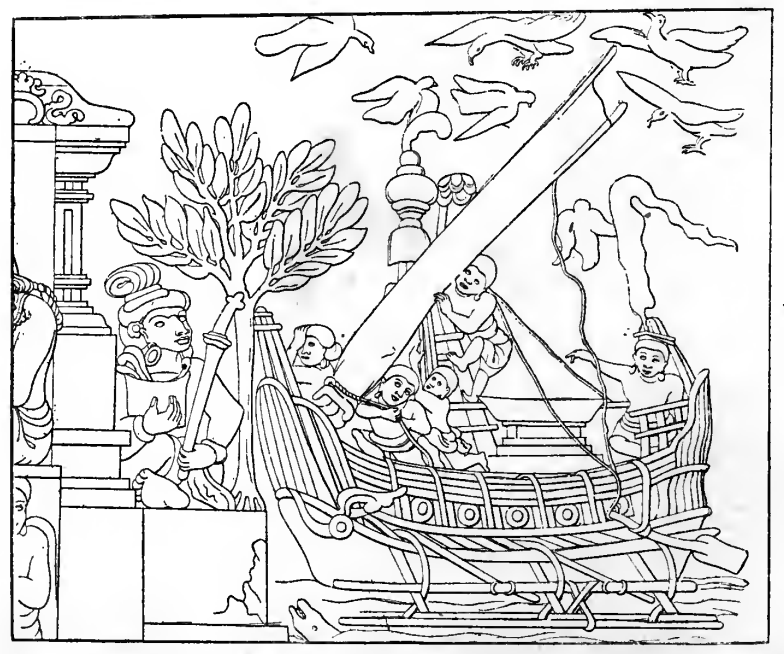

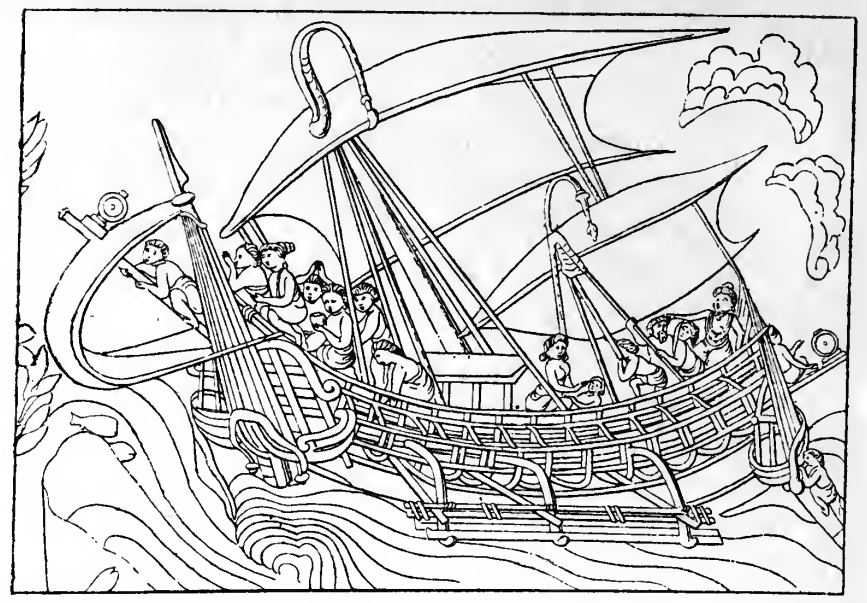

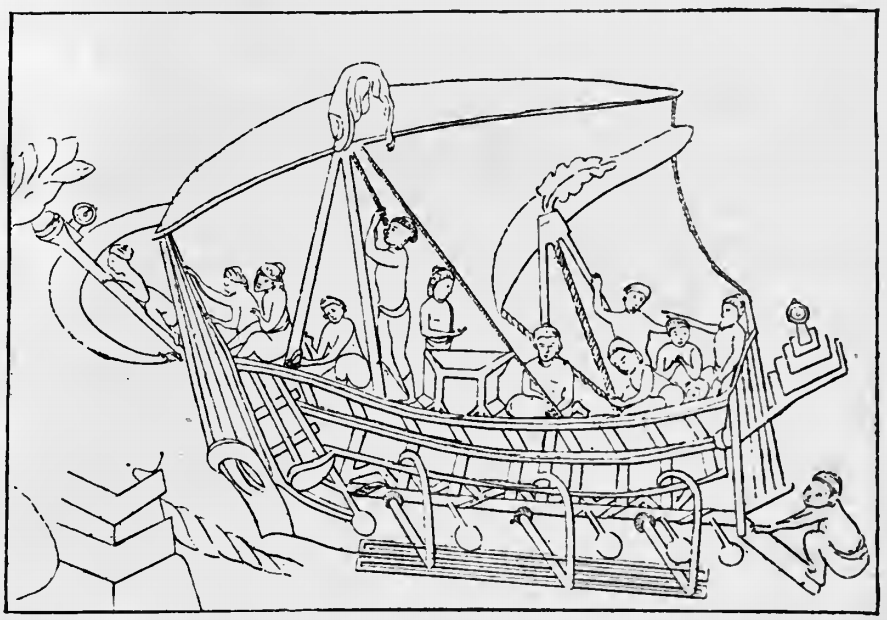

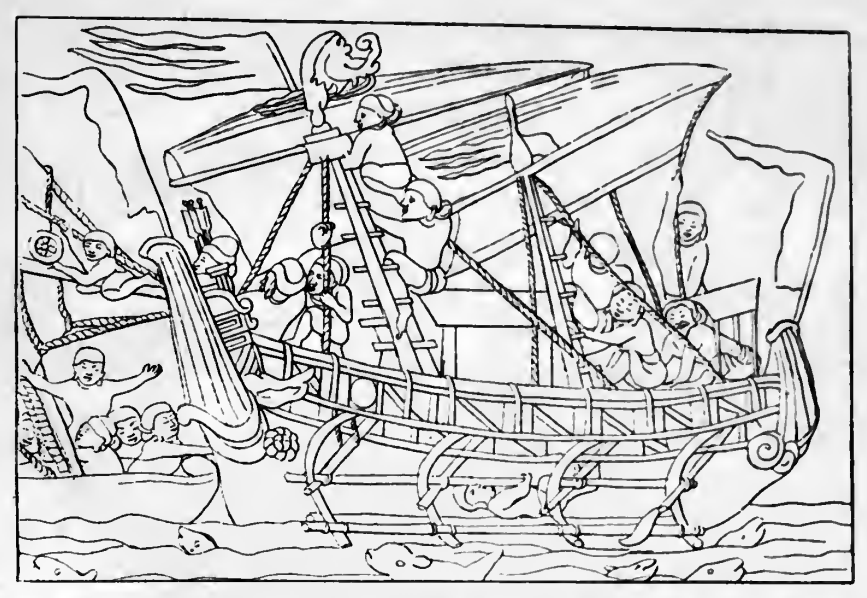

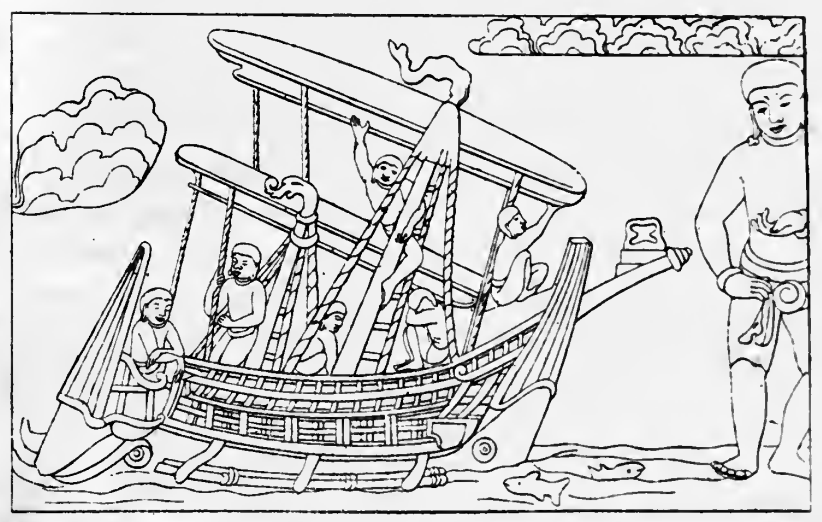

== Replica ==
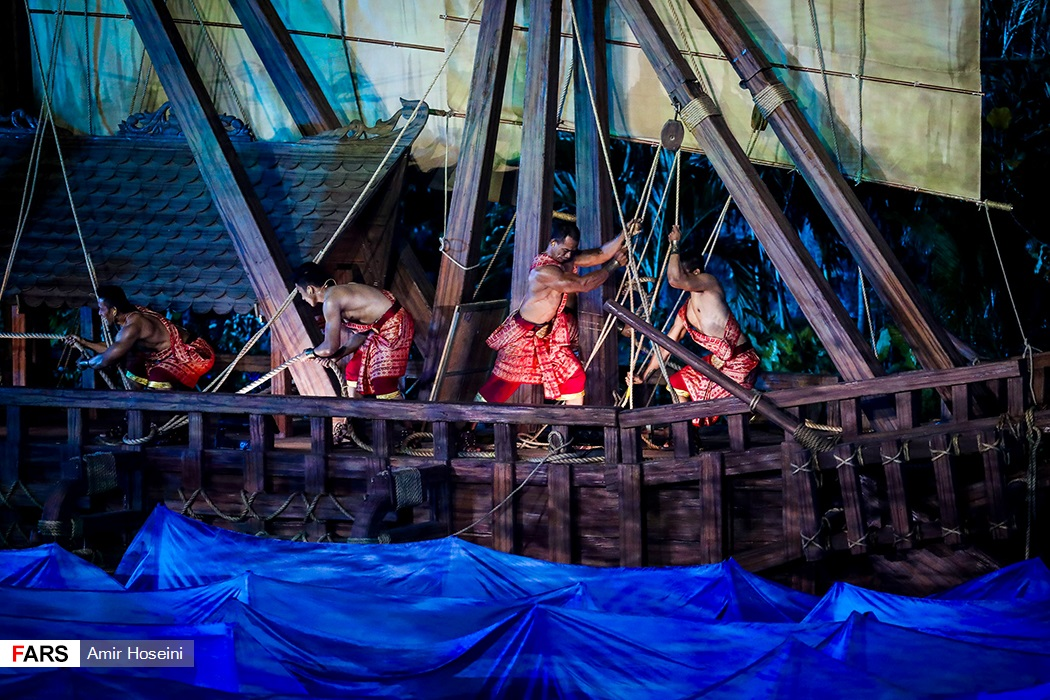
A replica of Borobudur ship during 2018 Asian Games opening ceremony

- The earliest replica of this ship was made in the Philippines in 1985, based on the Pontian boat structure. It is called Sarimanok (lucky little bird), used to sail to Java and Madagascar.
- The least known replica was named Damar Sagara, completed in 1992.
- The well known replica, Samudra Raksa, is housed at Samudra Raksa museum, Magelang, Central Java, Indonesia, built in 2003. It sailed to the Seychelles, Madagascar, South Africa and Ghana between August 2003 and February 2004.
- One replica is moored on Marine March of Resorts World Sentosa dock in Singapore.
- Borobudur relief serve as the basis for constructing "Spirit of Majapahit", a replica of Majapahit ship. This replica has received criticism from historians, because the ship used by Majapahit is jong while the Borobudur relief ship is an earlier vessel.
- A replica of Borobudur ship was featured in the opening ceremony of the Asian Games 2018 on 18 August 2018 in Gelora Bung Karno Stadium, Jakarta.

== In popular culture ==
- Borobudur ship and ship carving are featured in the Age of Empires II expansion pack, Rise of the Rajas, and its remaster, Age of Empires II: Definitive Edition.
- Borobudur ship serve as the basis for the model of Majapahit Jong in video game Civilization VI, with double outriggers, double quarter rudders, and rowers.

== See also ==
- Karakoa
- Kora kora
- K'un-lun po (kolandiaphonta), a type of vessel used in the archipelago as early as 2nd century A.D.
- Padewakang, a traditional boats used by the Bugis and Makassar people of South Sulawesi and the Mandar people of West Sulawesi.
