= Bob Hobman =

British-Australian sailor

- Occupations: Sailor, author
- Years active: 1984–present
- Known for: Recreating ancient sea journeys
- Notable work: Sarimanok
- Children: 1 son

Bob Hobman is a British-Australian sailor known for his recreation of ancient maritime journeys. In 1984, he led an expedition to sail an outrigger boat from The Philippines to Madagascar across the Indian Ocean to replicate the voyage of Neolithic humans. In 2014, Hobman and his son built and sailed an 11-metre raft from the Greek Island of Kythira to Crete to replicate a Palaeolithic sea journey. In 2020, he led an attempt to cross the Timor Sea in a bamboo raft from Indonesia to Australia, but was deported after lacking the proper research permits.

== Career ==
In 1984, Hobman and a group began the expedition to sail the Sarimanok, a 59-foot vinta outrigger boat, from The Philippines to Madagascar across the Indian Ocean to recreate how Neolithic humans might have made the crossing. The boat was created from a century-old tree by craftsmen on the island of Tawi Tawi in The Philippines. The crew, comprising Bob Hobman, nutritionist Sally Crook, Steve Corrigan, Robin Davey, navigator Bill McGrath, American surfing photographer Don King, cameraman Peter Rogers, and Albrecht Schaeffer ate only food that was available to the early humans of what is now Indonesia such as rice, taro, fruit, and dried fish. The boat left Tawi Tawi on 1 May 1984. It faced strong winds that damaged the boat's rudders and outriggers and blew it off course. In July, crew member Hans Cristoffer "Chico" Hansen, an artist from Hawaii, died after being airlifted from Java to an American military hospital in the Philippines. Hobman believed that the illness may have been caused by the 150 litres of water they had picked up in June from Kalimantan (Indonesian Borneo). The expedition was ended to be retried the following June.

On 3 June 1985, Sarimanok was launched after being rebuilt in Bali. Later that month, after 15 days at sea, the boat detoured to the Cocos Islands after a crew member, 59-year-old Colin Putt of New Zealand, fell ill. He was flown to a hospital in Western Australia to treat possible malaria or hepatitis. The boat was repaired as the crew had been baling water from it every half hour for the two previous weeks to keep it from sinking.

In 2018, Hobman published the book Sarimanok about the journey.

After the 2010 discovery of tools dated to over 130,000 years ago on Crete, Hobman was inspired to recreate a sea journey to the island taken by Palaeolithic humans. In 2013, Hobman and his son Kadek Hobman travelled to the Greek Island of Kythira to harvest a native reed. They stored it to dry over the winter. In May 2014, they returned to build an 11-metre (36 ft) raft from the material. In August 2014, Hobman, his son, and eight others sailed the raft to recreate an ancient sea journey between Kythira and Crete. They sailed for two days without stopping.

In 2020, Hobman and a group of five others aimed to create a bamboo raft and cross the Timor Sea from Indonesia to Darwin, Australia. The group was deported after Indonesian government officials found that they did not have a research permit.
