= Ross T. Christensen =

American archaeologist

Ross Taylor Christensen (August 28, 1918 – January 12, 1990) was an American archeologist.

== Biography ==
Christensen was born in Preston, Idaho to Henry Oswald Christensen and Nettie Lavina Taylor Christensen. His father was a teacher at what is today Brigham Young University-Idaho. From 1939-1942 Christensen served as a missionary for the Church of Jesus Christ of Latter-day Saints (LDS Church) in Brazil. He later served in the United States military in the European Theatre of World War II. In 1947 he married Ruth Richardson Morris in the Mesa LDS Temple. They had two sons and seven daughters.

Christensen received his bachelor's degree in archeology from Brigham Young University (BYU). He also received a master's degree from BYU and studied for two years towards a Ph.D. at Yale University, but then transferred to the University of Arizona where he completed his Ph.D.

From 1952-1979 Christensen was a professor of archeology at BYU. He was a popular teacher and BYU Education Week speaker. He was also closely connected with the Society for Early Historic Archaeology, which he headed after his retirement from BYU. Among Christensen's assistants while in this position was Michael T. Griffith.

In 1985 Christensen wrote a long paper with John A. Tvedtnes entitled "Ur of the Chaldeans: Increasing Evidence on the Birthplace of Abraham and the Original Homeland of the Hebrews".

Among his callings in the LDS Church, Christensen was a counselor to a bishop in Orem, Utah.
