= Tanja sail =

Oblique quadrilateral sail from south east Asia

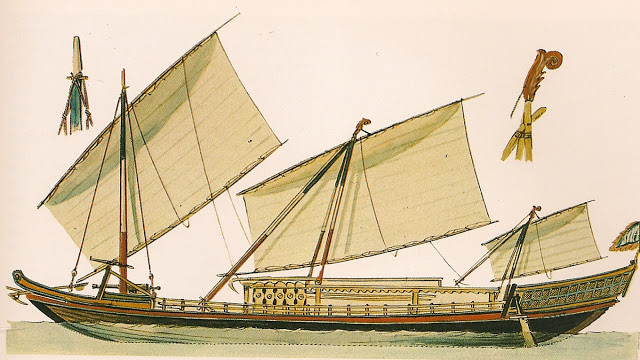
A lanong with three tanja sails of the Iranun people of the Philippines

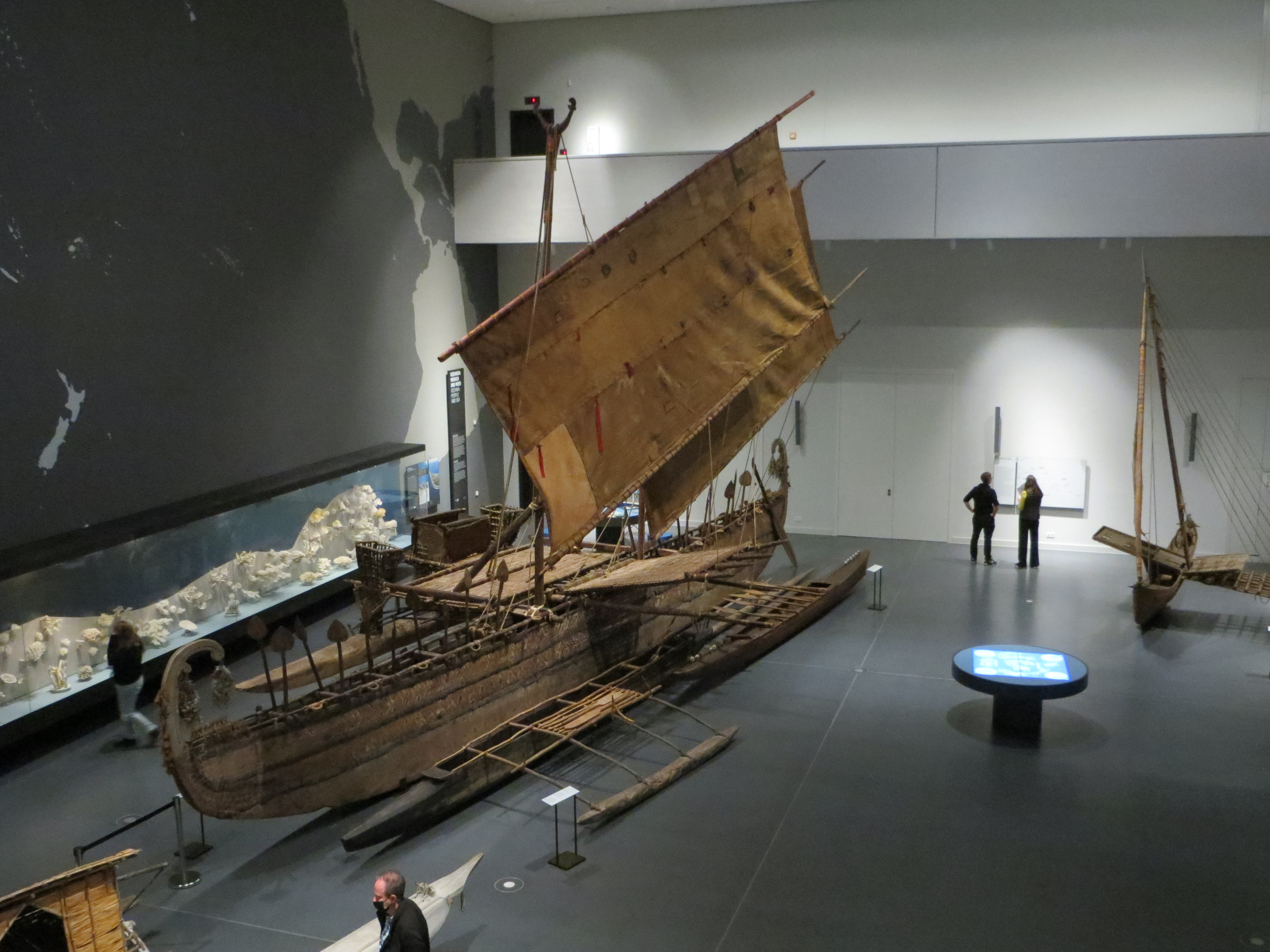
The "Luf Boat", a Micronesian catamaran with tanja sails in the Humboldt Forum, obtained in 1903 from Luf Island, Hermit Islands, Bismarck Archipelago

Tanja sail (Malay: layar tanjak) or tanja rig is a type of sail commonly used by the Austronesian people, particularly in Maritime Southeast Asia. It is also known as the tilted square sail, canted rectangular sail, rectangular balance lug, or balance lug sail in English. In historical sources, a tanja sail is sometimes incorrectly referred to as a lateen sail or simply square sail.

== Etymology ==
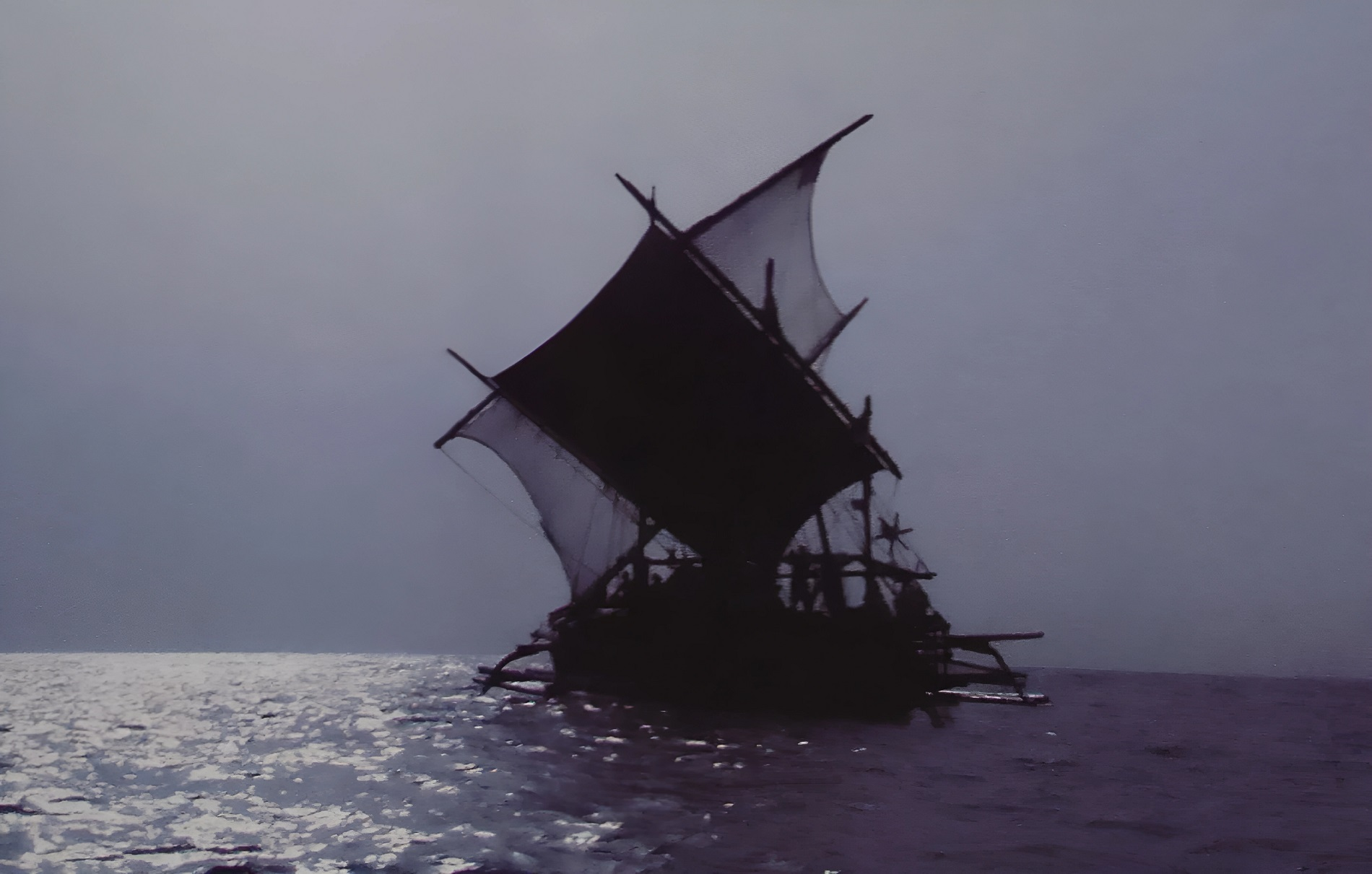
Samudra Raksa running before the wind, with "goosewing" sail configuration (receiving wind from aft).

Also called tanjaq, tanjak, tanja', tanjong, or tanjung sail. The Mandar people call it sombal tanjaq because when the wind blows the lower part of the sail (peloang) would "mattanjaq" (lit. "kick"). In colonial British records, it is sometimes written as "lyre tanjong", a misspelling of layar tanjong (layar means "sail" in Malay; layag in Philippine languages).

== Origin ==
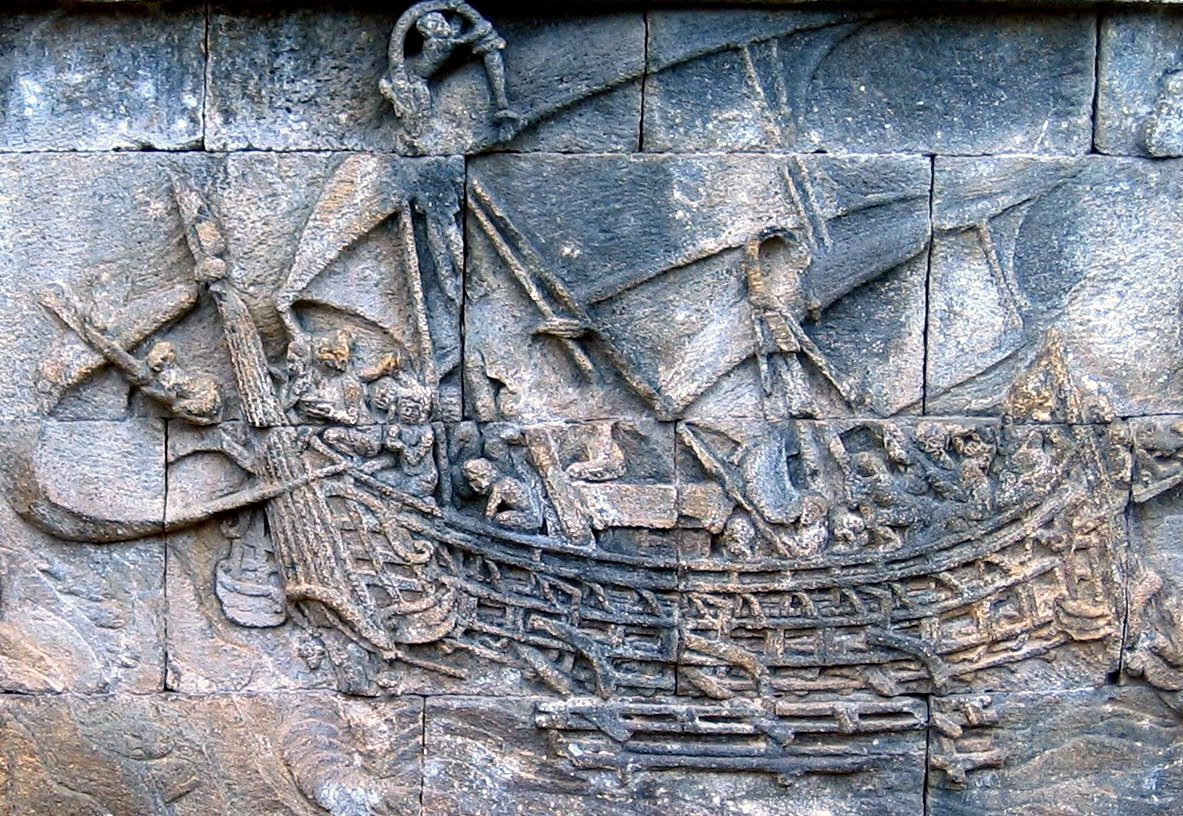
One of the ships in Borobudur depicting a double-outrigger vessel with tanja sails in bas-relief (c. 8th–9th century)

There are several different theories regarding the origin of tanja sail.

The sail might be a derivative of the older Austronesian triangular crab-claw sail. It developed from the fixed mast version of the crab-claw sail and is functionally identical, with the only difference being that the upper and bottom spars of the tanja sail do not converge into a point in the leading edge.

According to H. Warington Smyth, the Malay tanja sail is an adaptation and development of the primitive square sail, with boom at the head and the foot. The Malay tilted the sail forward, to bring the tack right to the deck, turning the sail into the most powerful of lifting sails on a wind.

== Characteristics ==
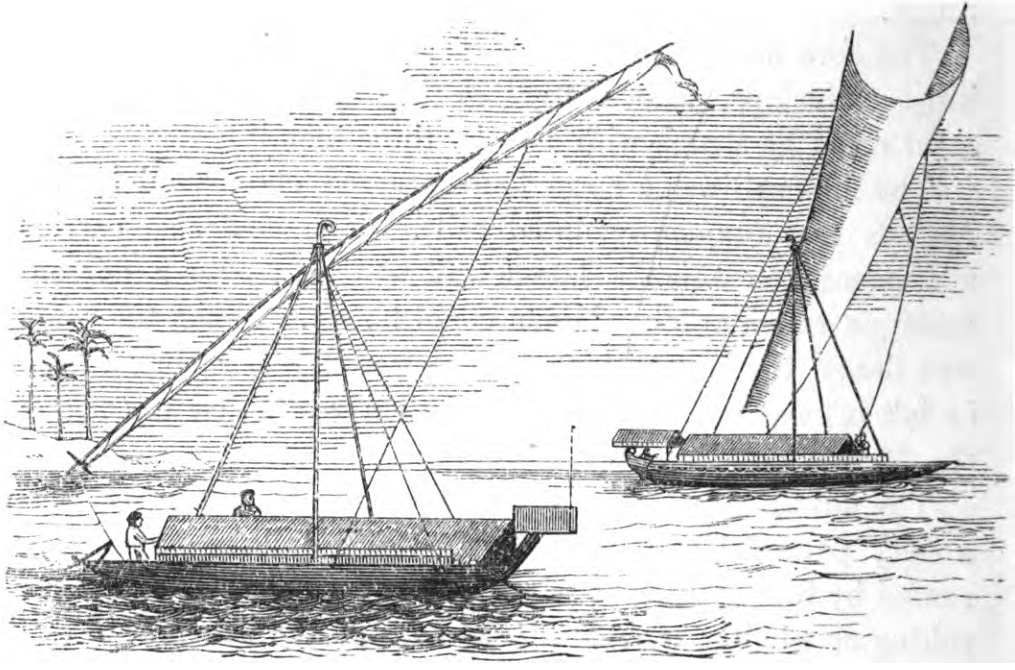
1863 illustration of padewakang ships in Sulawesi with furled and unfurled tanja sails

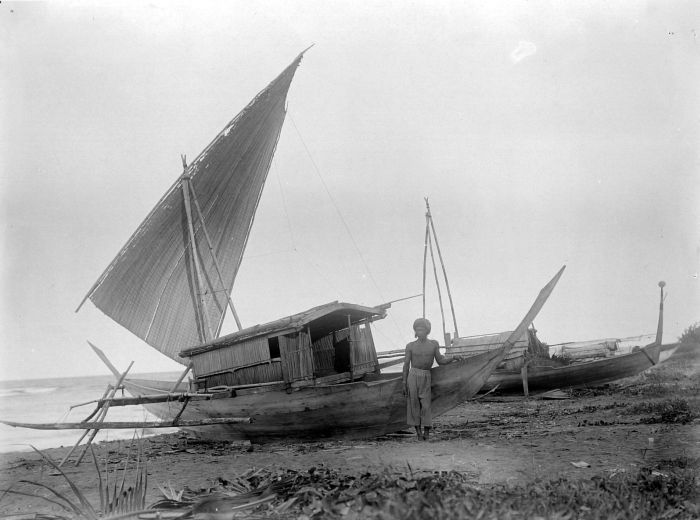
A kora-kora from Halmahera, Maluku Islands (c. 1920) with a tanja sail

Tanja sail can be distinguished by its canted/oblique design. The sail face is asymmetrical in shape and most of the area is elongated to the sides, rather than upward like those of lug sail. Tanja sails were rigged similarly to crab claw sails and also had spars on both the head and the foot of the sails; but they were square or rectangular with the spars not converging into a point. They are generally mounted on one or two (rarely three) bipod or tripod masts, usually made from thick bamboo. The masts have curved heads with grooves for attaching the halyards. The lower part of two of the bamboo poles of the mast assembly have holes that are aligned and slotted across a piece of timber, functioning as a hinge. The forward part of the mast assembly had a forelock. By unlocking it, the masts can be lowered across the ship.

Despite the similarity of its appearance to western square rigs, the tanja is a fore-and-aft rig functioning similar to a lugsail. The sail was suspended from the upper spar ("yard"), while the lower spar functioned like a boom. When set fore-and-aft, the spars extend forward of the mast by about a third. When running before the wind, they are set perpendicular to the hull, similar to a square rig. The sail can be rotated around the mast (lessening the need for steering with the rudders) and tilted to move the center of pull forward or aft. The sail can even be tilted completely horizontally, lifting the bow above incoming waves. The sail is reefed by rolling it around the lower spar.

In addition to the tanja sails, ships with the tanja rigs also have bowsprits set with a quadrilateral headsail, sometimes also canted as depicted in the Borobudur ships. In the colonial era, these were replaced by triangular western-style jibs (often several in later periods), and the tanja sails themselves were slowly replaced with western rigs like gaff rigs.

The 3rd century book "Strange Things of the South" (南州異物志) by Wan Chen (萬震) describes large ships which originates from K'un-lun (Southern country, either Java or Sumatra). The ships called K'un-lun po (or K'un-lun bo). He explains the ship's sail design as follows:

The four sails do not face directly forward, but are set obliquely, and so arranged that they can all be fixed in the same direction, to receive the wind and to spill it. Those sails which are behind the most windward one receiving the pressure of the wind, throw it from one to the other, so that they all profit from its force. If it is violent, (the sailors) diminish or augment the surface of the sails according to the conditions. This oblique rig, which permits the sails to receive from one another the breath of the wind, obviates the anxiety attendant upon having high masts. Thus these ships sail without avoiding strong winds and dashing waves, by the aid of which they can make great speed.
— Wan Chen, Nánzhōu Yìwùzhì (Strange Things of the South)

== Usage ==
Most Southeast Asian and Austronesian vessels used the tanja sail. This type of sail may have brought Austronesian sailors as far as West Africa sometime in the 1st millennium CE, with its feasibility proved by an expedition carried out by a replica ship using such sail in 2003, and there is probability these sailors reached the New World as early as 1420 CE. Some examples of vessels that use tanja sails include:

- Balangay
- Benawa
- Borobudur ship
- Djong
- Garay
- Kakap
- Karakoa
- Kelulus
- Kora-kora
- K'un-lun po
- Lancaran
- Lanong
- Mayang
- Padewakang
- Pajala
- Pangajava
- Patorani
- Pencalang
- Perahu

== See also ==
- Crab claw sail
- Lug sail
- Junk rig
- Lateen rig
- List of Indonesian inventions and discoveries
