= Phoenician Ship Expedition =

Recreation of a 6th-century BC Phoenician voyage conceived by Philip Beale

The Phoenician Ship Expedition is a re-creation of a 6th-century BCE Phoenician voyage conceived by Philip Beale. The replica of an ancient Phoenician ship departed from Syria in August 2008, to sail through the Suez Canal, around the Horn of Africa, and up the west coast of Africa, through the Strait of Gibraltar and across the Mediterranean to return to Syria. The objective of the expedition was to prove that ships built by the ancient Phoenicians could withstand the conditions around the African coastline.

The expedition reached South Africa in January 2010 and Beirut in October of the same year.

The ship is twenty metres long and was constructed at Arwad Island, the site of an ancient Phoenician city-state just off the Syrian coast, by Syrian shipwright Khalid Hammoud, using traditional methods.

There is varied evidence for the Phoenicians exploring the coast of Africa. Engraved in Punic on a bronze belt at the Temple of Baal in Carthage, there is evidence of a Phoenician sailing down the east coast of Africa. It is said that the Carthaginian Hanno the Navigator traveled for 35 days along the west coast in the 5th century BCE. In a story told by Herodotus, Phoenicians in the Egyptian area of Africa circumnavigated the continent. It is believed Herodotus was told this story when he traveled to Egypt.

== Phoenicians Before Columbus expedition ==
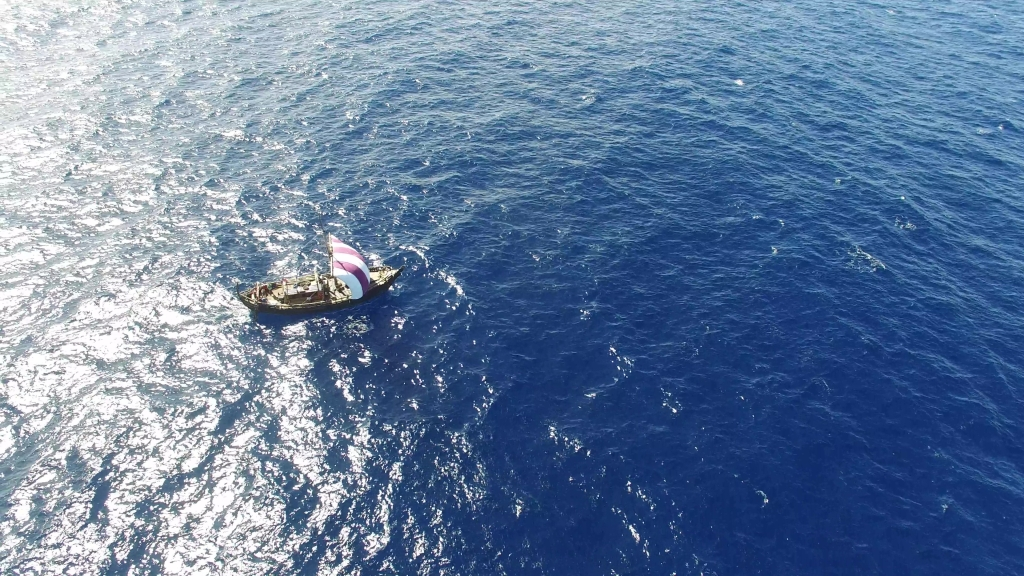
Phoenicia entering the Caribbean, December 2019

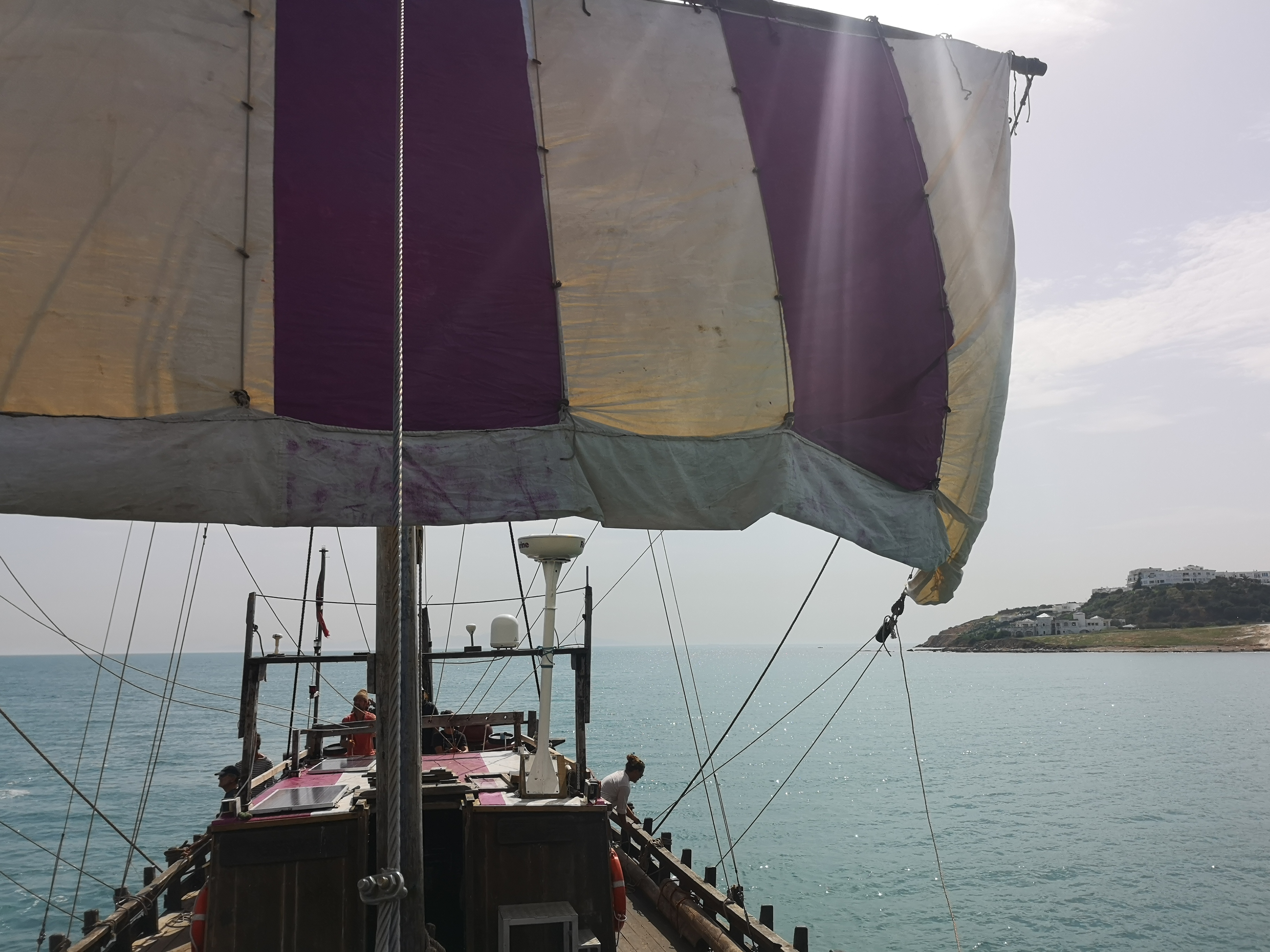
Phoenicia at sail, Tunisia, September 2019

A second sea voyage was also completed. On 31 December 2019, the Phoenicia docked in the port of Santo Domingo, Dominican Republic. For this final voyage, Beale set out to demonstrate that the Phoenicians could have crossed the Atlantic Ocean long before Christopher Columbus. The journey was launched on 28 September 2019 in the commune of Carthage, Tunisia, site of the ancient city of Carthage, and reached Santo Domingo before 31 December 2019.

One theory claimed that the Canaanites, who were later called Phoenicians by the Greeks, may have been the first to reach the Americas. According to American anthropologist Marshall McKusick (1979), Punic inscriptions on the east coast of North America have been found to be misidentifications or fraud. The American historian Ronald H. Fritze concluded in 2009 that although technically possible, "no archaeological evidence has yet been discovered to prove the contentions of Irwin, Gordon, Bailey, Fell and others. Since even the fleeting Norse presence in Vinland left definite archaeological remains at L'Anse aux Meadows in Newfoundland, it seems logical that the allegedly more extensive Phoenician and Carthaginian presence would have left similar evidence. The absence of such remains is strong circumstantial evidence that the Phoenicians and Carthaginians never reached the Americas."

== Purchase by Latter Day Saints ==
The ship has been purchased by members of the Latter Day Saint movement, with the intent of restoring it and setting up a visitor center in Iowa, US, near the Mississippi River. Their website says, "We will unveil the magnificence of a historic ship that goes back 2,600 years from the time when Mulek and his people traveled from Jerusalem to the Heartland of America."
