= Samudra Raksa Museum =

Samudra Raksa Museum Museum Samudra Raksa
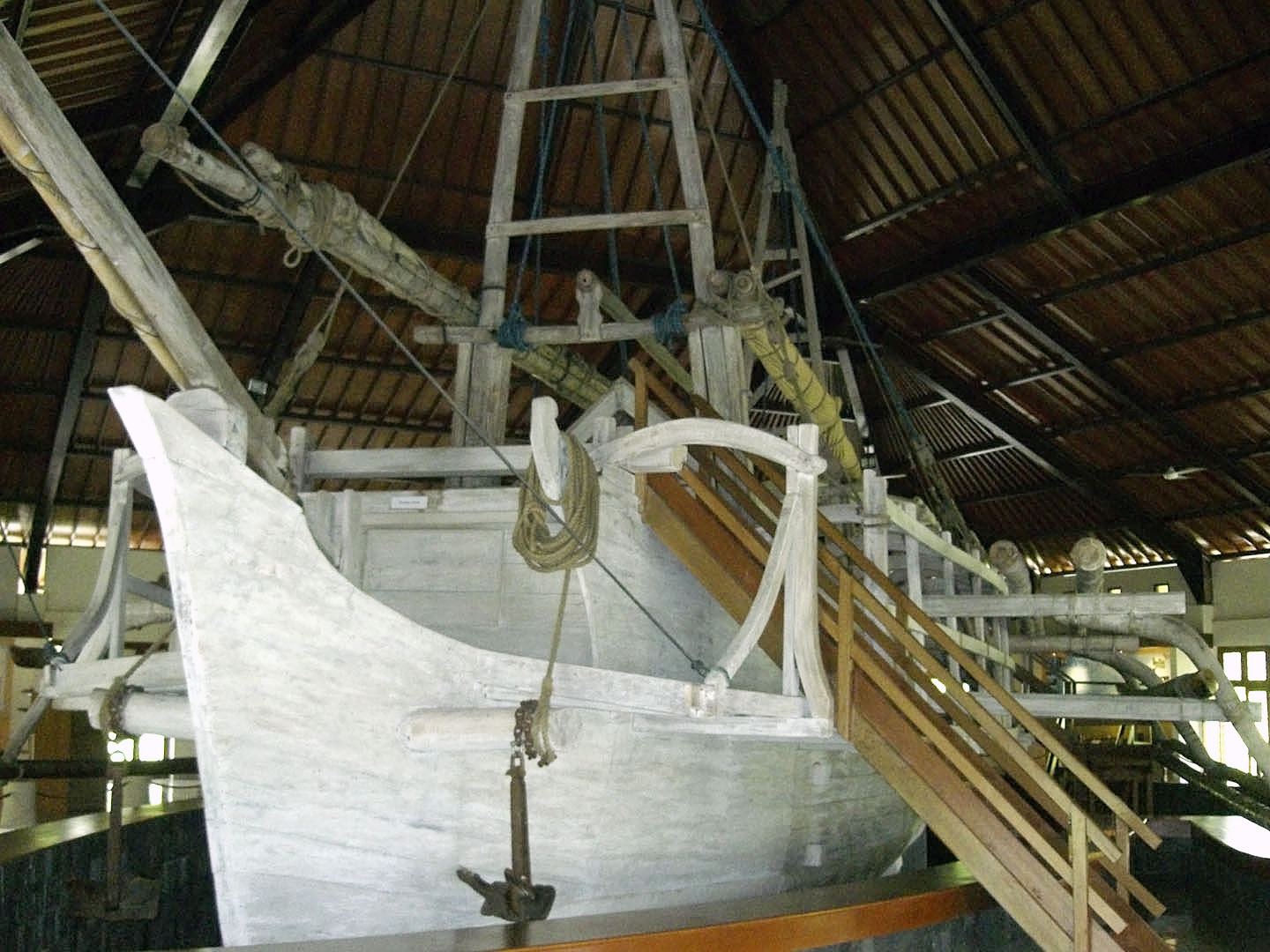
- The reconstructed Borobudur ship as the centerpiece of Samudra Raksa Museum
- Established: 2005
- Location: Borobudur, Magelang, Central Java, Indonesia
- Type: Maritime museum, Archaeology museum
- Website: The Cinnamon Route

Samudra Raksa Museum is a maritime museum that was built several hundred meters north of the 8th-century Borobudur Buddhist monument, within the Borobudur archaeological complex, Magelang, Central Java, Indonesia. The museum features and interprets the ancient maritime Indian Ocean trade among between ancient Indonesia, Madagascar, and East Africa, popularly dubbed as "the cinnamon route". The centerpiece of museum is the full-scale reconstruction of the 8th-century Borobudur ship. It was used in a successful expedition from Indonesia to Madagascar and Ghana in 2003–2004. The Borobudur Ship — a 25 meter-long wooden ship modeled after wall reliefs found on the 8th century Borobudur temple in Central Java.

The Ship Museum Samudra Raksa was opened on 31 August 2005 by Coordinating Minister for Welfare Prof. Dr. Alwi Shihab of the Republic of Indonesia. It is in part a tribute to the crew, the Indonesian specialists who built the ship, and the government and international collaboration that supported the Borobudur Ship Expedition.

Also located within the Borobudur archaeological complex, next to Samudra Raksa Museum, is Karmawibhangga Museum. This features photographs of the Karmawibhangga bas reliefs carved on the hidden foot of Borobudur, and other Borobudur carved stones and archaeological artifacts. The entry to both museums are included within the entrance ticket of Borobudur Archaeological Park.

== Bibliography ==
- Pareanom, Yusi Avianto (2005). Cinnamon Route, The Samudraraksa Borobudur Expedition. Yogyakarta: PT. Taman Wisata Candi Borobudur, Prambanan & Ratu Boko, Ministry of Culture and Tourism of Republic of Indonesia, Lontar Foundation. ISBN 979-8083-58-X.
