= Lancang (ship) =

Ship from Malay Culture

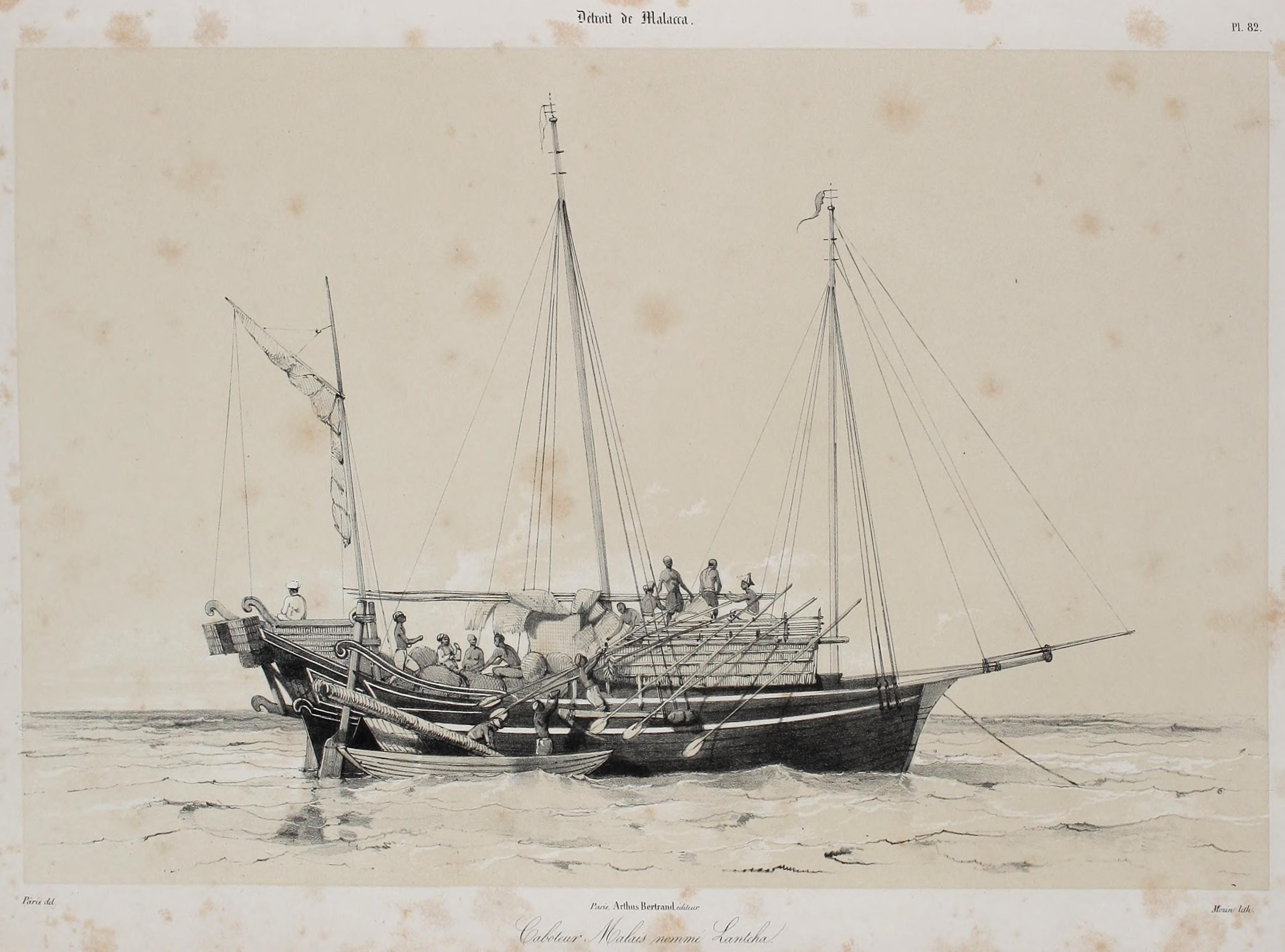
A lancha seen by François-Edmond Pâris, 1841.

A lancang (also written lanchang or lancha) is a type of sailing ship from Maritime Southeast Asia. It is used as warship, lighter, and as royal ship, particularly used by the people of Malay Peninsula, Sumatran east coast, but can also be found in the coast of Kalimantan.

== Etymology ==
The name comes from the Malay word lancang which means "swift".

== Design and construction ==
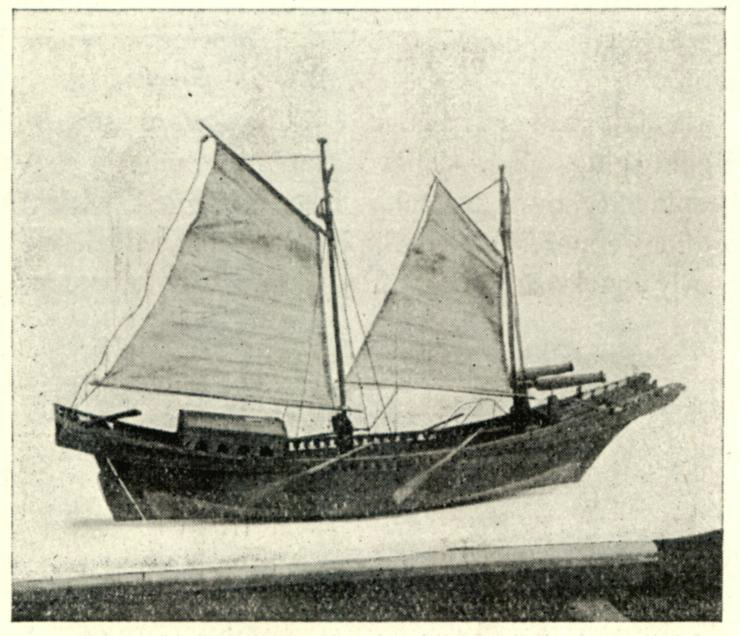
Model of Lanchang To'Aru.

The earliest mention of the lancang is from Julah inscription dated 844 Saka (923 AD), which explains the orders of the King Sri Ugrasena on certain rules. The inscription mentions terms for boats such as "lancang", "parahu", "jukung", "talaka", "bahitra", and "jong". It is the oldest form of boat building in the Indonesian archipelago and has been recorded in Gilimanuk, Bali. The boat builders are known as undagi lancang. According to the Ngantang inscription, lancang were also used in Majapahit-controlled areas. The lancang of this era has no sails.

Lancang have overhanging square sterns above a sharp waterline stern. Lancang usually have 2 masts, but single and tri-masted vessels are also recorded. Historically they were steered using double quarter rudders, but in the 18th century they also used axial rudders mounted at the sternpost. The smallest lancang were 5 depa (9.1 m) long, with a 1 depa (1.8 m) beam, draft of 1.5 ft (46 cm), and a 4 ft (1.2 m) freeboard. These smaller boats could carry cargo of around 5 pikul (312.5 kg) and were crewed by 4 men, while the largest may have reached about 26 m long, based on the Sambirejo shipwreck. Lancang from older era is rigged using tanja sails, but dipping lug sails or fore-and-aft sails are used after the arrival of the European. Lancang has "clipper" bow, with triangular fore-gallery for anchor, which also acts as bowsprit. Headsails may be used at the bow. The hull is carvel-built, built with style very similar to European ships. They are usually armed with pivot guns.

In Bandar, Malaysia, a type of lancang called lancang To'Aru is built. (Note: To'Aru was one of the council of four great chiefs of Selangor, who in former days had much power, and to whom was entrusted the election of the Sultan. To'Aru was the most powerful of these four great chiefs, and took his name from a district called Aru, in Sumatra, from which he came over to settle in Selangor. Aru is probably the same as the word "Aru" (also eru or 'ru), which means a casuarina-tree. Bandar was the name of the place (on the Langat River) where To'Aru lived (Smyth, 1902: 580).) It is similar to lancang in hull, but with projecting or hanging rectangular platform over the bow, in which two swivel guns are mounted. The sail is using fore-and-aft sail in gaff and boom on two masts. Boats which such rig on the east coast of Malaya generally carry long topmasts and jib-booms for light-weather sails.

== Uses ==
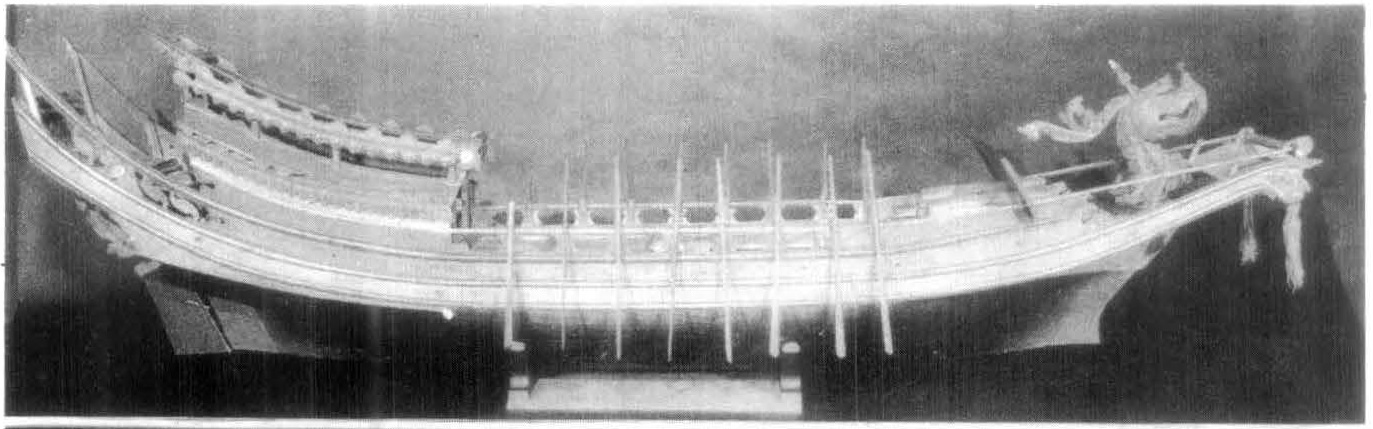
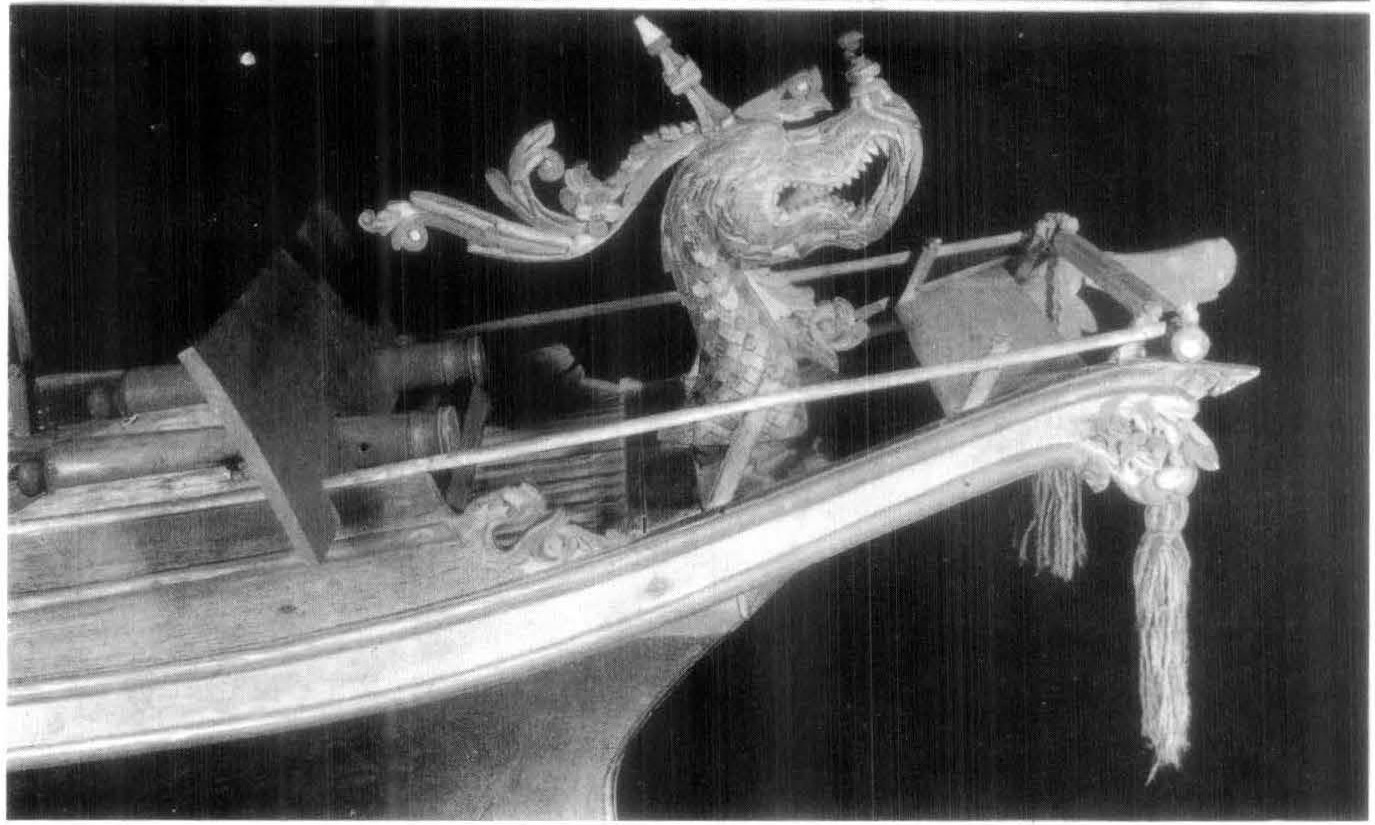
A model of a lancang kuning. It is propelled by paddles, the rudder is axial rudder. On the bow is a dragon-shaped figurehead. Two heavy guns are mounted in an apilan.

Lancang were primarily used for war and as merchant vessels. Portuguese records mentioned their use as barges or lighters. The intercourse with European people decreased Singaporean piracy in 1820s, although it still exist, using smaller ships than formerly used, for several decades to come. Around Singaporean waters, Malay pirates used lanchang carrying 25–30 men, with shallow draft, making them easy to conceal in mangroves. They generally used lancang between 15 and 18 m long, 3.4–4 m in beam, and with 1.5–2.1 m draft.

In the 20th century, Malay states used lancang as cargo boats. Along the Sumatran coast, ethnic Malay rajas (kings) used them as state ships. In Selangor, this royal vessel is dedicated to the service of the spirits, also called kapal hantu (ghost ship), which are laden with offerings, then set adrift to propitiate the demons of the sea. In Sumatra and Kalimantan, lancang play an important role in harvesting ceremonies and sometimes the boats are used in offering ceremonies to the god. Sometimes dragon heads are carved on the bow as a representation of power that maintains humans' safety.

== In traditional culture ==
Lancang Kuning (yellow lancang) is a traditional Malay ghazal song from Johor, Malaysia created by the Datuk Luar Bandar Johor in 1900. The traditional story was taken as a metaphor for the ruler's power and the state. A popular (poem) explains this:

Lancang kuning berlayar malam
Haluan menuju ke laut dalam
Kalau nakhoda kurang faham
Alamat kapal akan tenggelam

Translation:

The lancang kuning sails at night
Her bows towards high seas
If her skipper is ignorant
She is bound to be wrecked

Lancang Kuning is also a classic Malay film by Cathay-Keris Film Productions in 1962. It was produced in Singapore and directed by a Malaysian film director M. Amin.

== Gallery ==
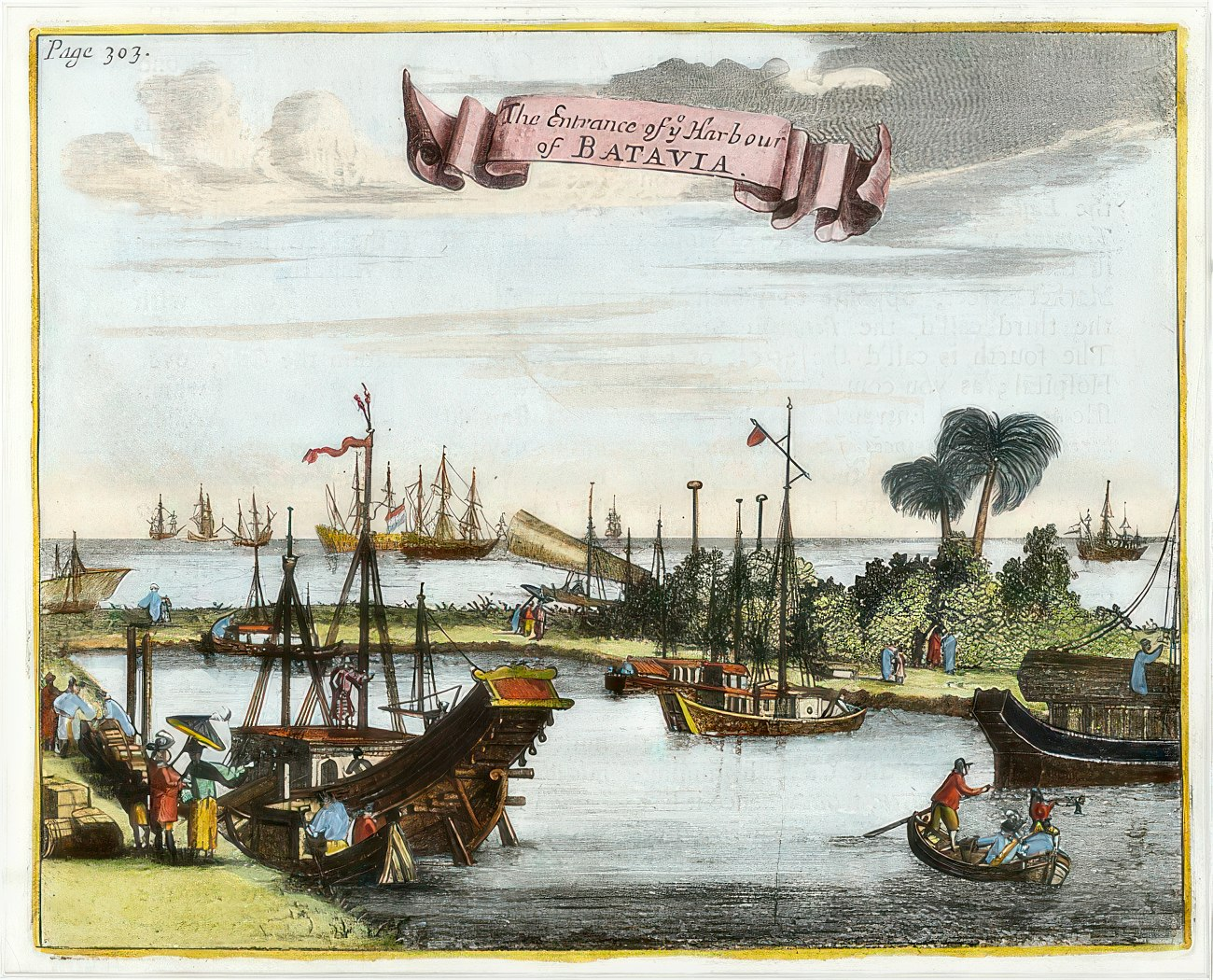
View of Batavia, 1669.

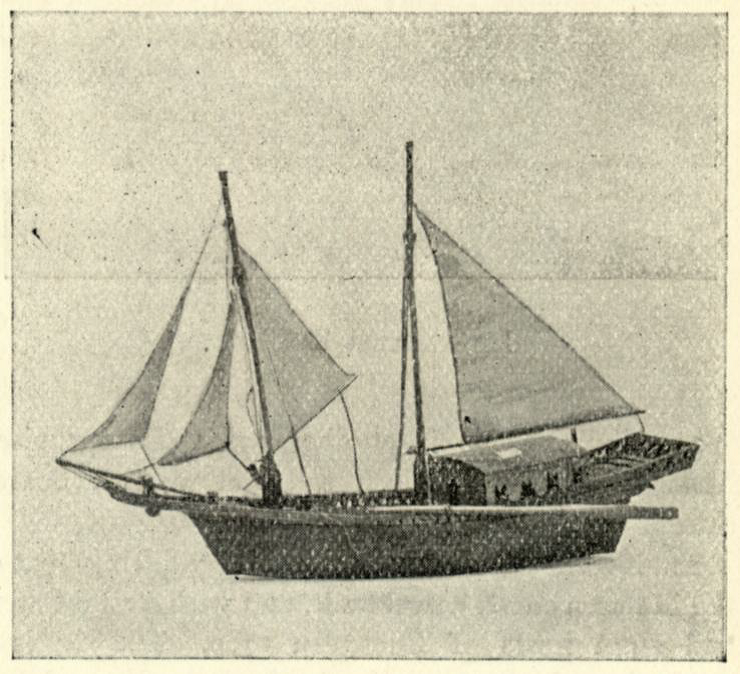
A model of lancha, 1902.

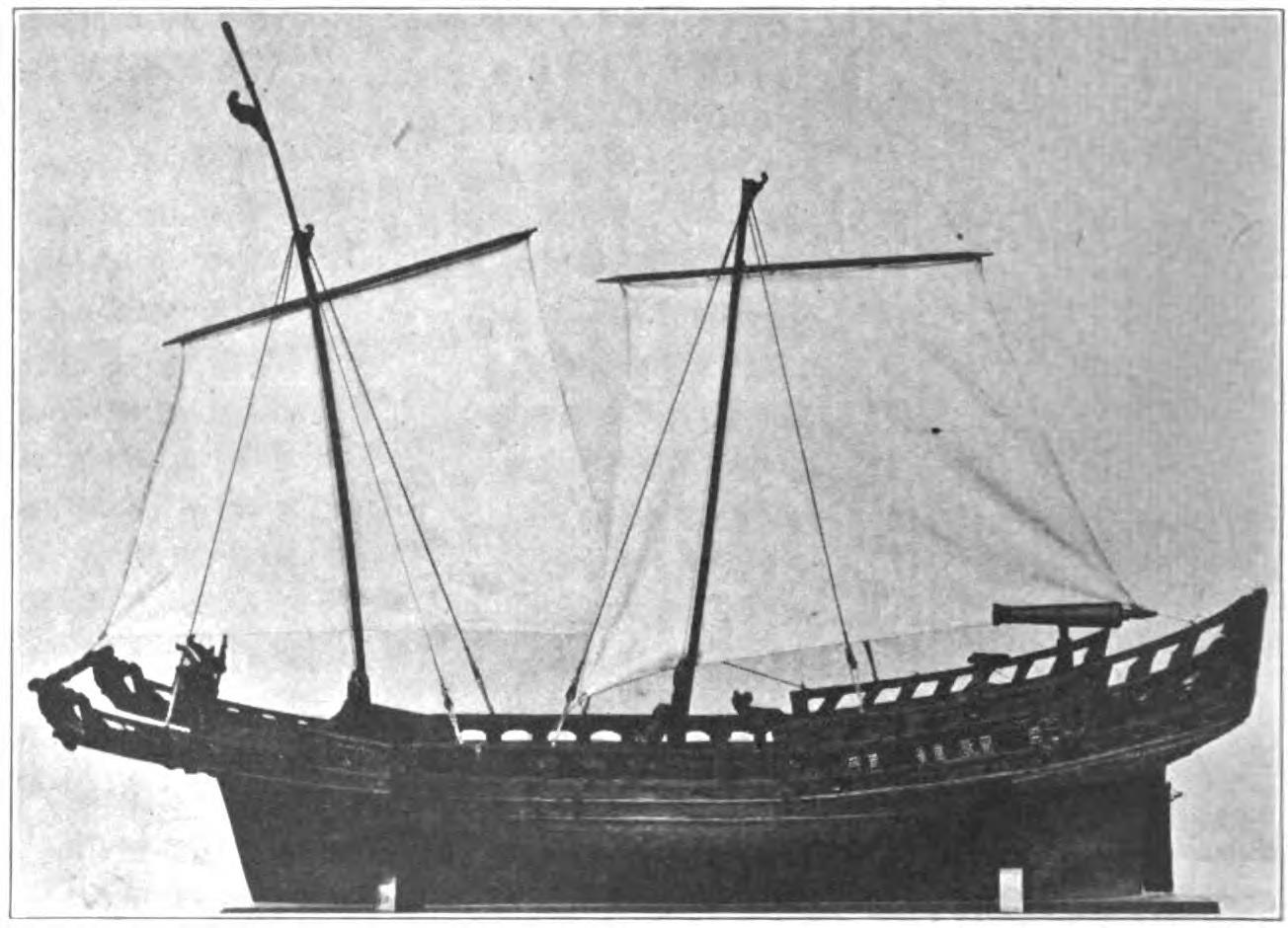
A model of lanchang, from Siak, on the coast of Sumatra.

== See also ==
- Lancaran
- Lanong
- Banting
- Bajak
- Sampan panjang
