= Sarimanok (vinta) =

Vinta sailed in 1985

Sarimanok is a vinta that was sailed in 1985 from Bali to Madagascar across the Indian Ocean to replicate ancient seafaring techniques. The ship is now at the Oceanographic Museum (Le musée du Centre National de Recherches Océanographique) of Nosy Be, an island off the northwestern coast of Madagascar.

== In popular culture ==
Two books have been written about the journey:

- Sarimanok by Bob Hobman, Grasset, 1989.
- Sarimanok by Albrecht Schaefer, Goldmann, 2000.

A movie was also made:

- Voyage of the Sarimanok (Bali to Madagascar)

== See also ==
- List of multihulls
