= Javanese contact with Australia =

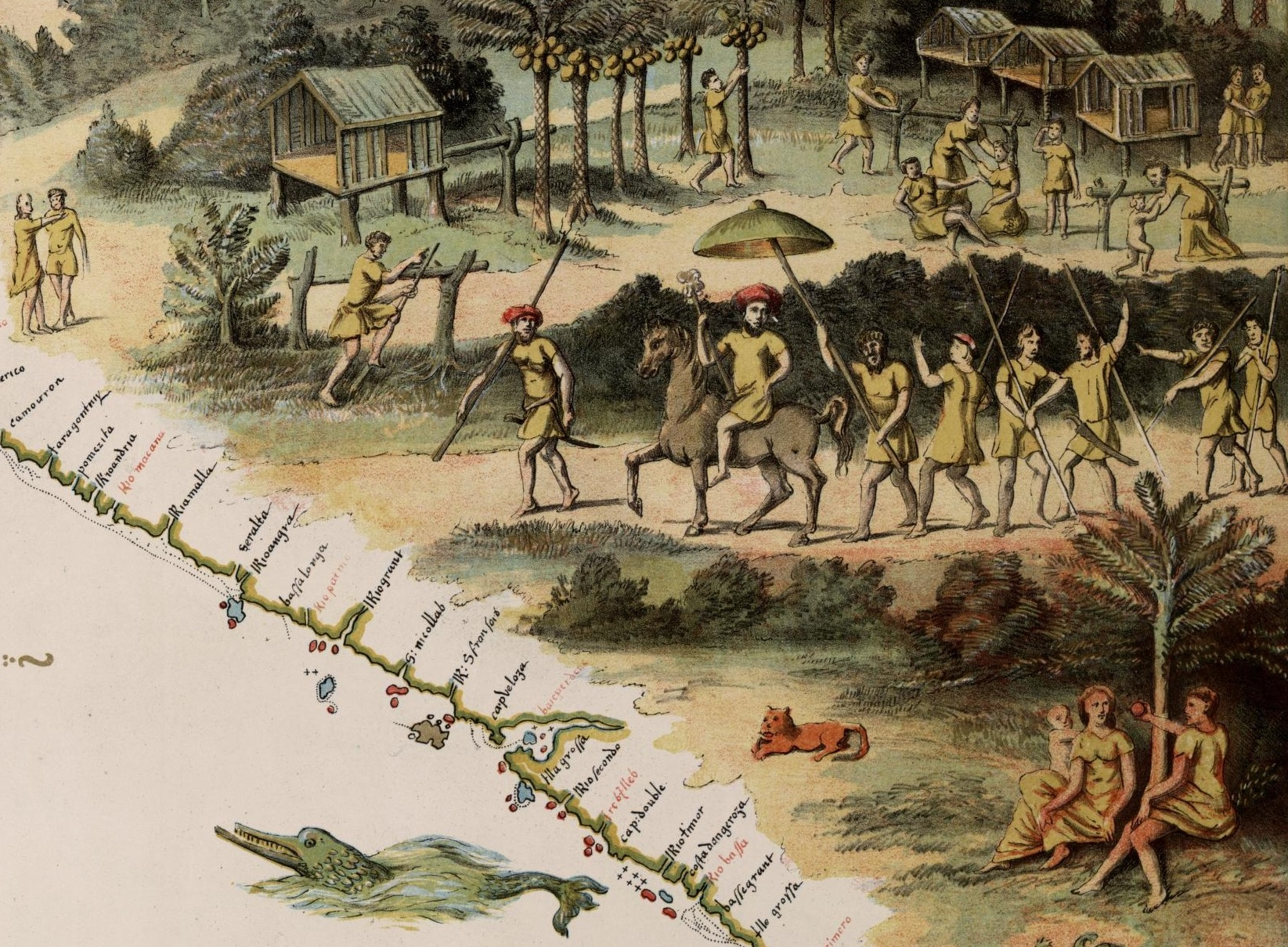
Inhabitants of Jave la Grande (Great Java island).

The Javanese presence in Australia has been reported by Southeast Asian and European people over several centuries. The most renowned record is from the itinerary of Chiaymasiouro, king of Demak, and Declaraçam de Malaca e India Meridional com o Cathay by Manuel Godinho de Eredia. Chiaymasiouro describes a land called Luca Antara southeast of Java, which Eredia coined with the term India Meridional (Meridional India - Southern/South India). According to Chiaymasiouro's accounts from 1601, a subgroup of Javanese people had already settled in those lands, but when Eredia's servant went to Luca Antara in 1610, the land had seemingly been abandoned.

== History ==
=== Pre-1500 ===
Reference to Australia and native Australian people has been recorded in 10th century Java. According to Waharu IV inscription (dated 931) and the Garaman inscription (1053), the Mataram kingdom and Airlangga's era Kahuripan Kingdom (1000–1049) of Java experienced a long prosperity so that it needed a lot of manpower, especially to bring crops, packings, and send them to ports. Black labor was imported from Jenggi (Zanzibar), Pujut (Sarawak), and Bondan (Papua). According to Naerssen, they arrived in Java by trading (bought by merchants) or being taken prisoner during a war and then made slaves.

=== 1500–1600 ===
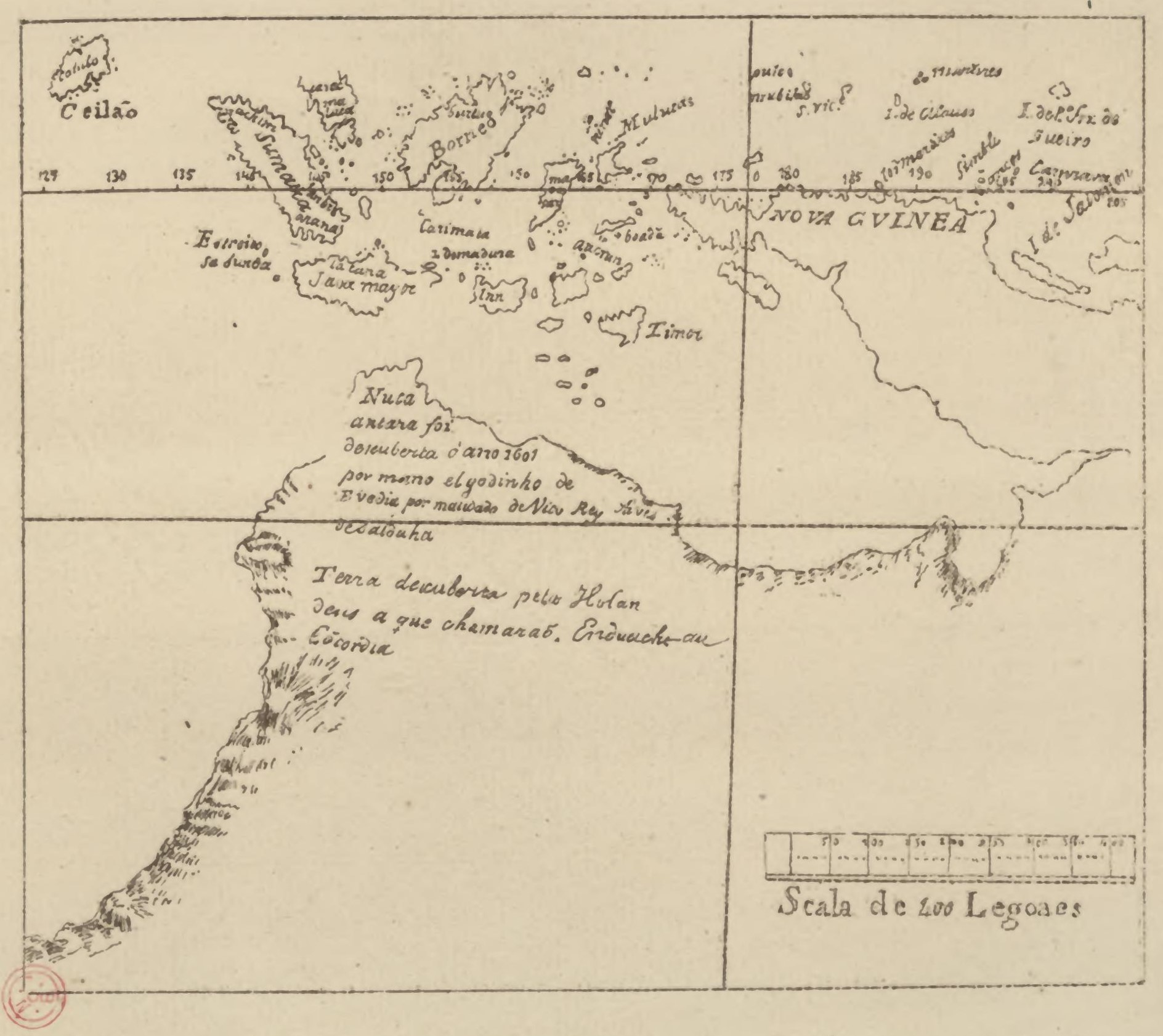
Map of East India and Southern India. Showing the Nuca antara (also known as Nusantara, Lucaantara, or Luca antara) as the peninsular region of Australia.

Ludovico di Varthema (1470–1517), in his book Itinerario de Ludouico de Varthema Bolognese, stated that the Southern Javanese people sailed to "far Southern lands" up to the point they arrived at an island where a day only lasted four hours long and was "colder than in any part of the world". Modern studies have determined that such an island would have been located at least 900 nautical miles (1,700 kilometres) (Note: The original transcription is "The point where the shortest day would only last four hours would be 15° south of the southern point of Van Diemen's Land".) south of the southernmost point of Tasmania.

Around the second quarter of 16th century, several European maps included a continent called Jave la Grande (or La Grande Jave). In La Cosmographie, Alfonse defined La Grande Jave as an extension of the giant Antarctic continent, or Terra Australis: "This Java touches the Strait of Magellan in the west, and in the east Terra Australis ... I estimate that the coast of the Ocean Sea called the Austral coast extends eastwards to Java, to the western coast of the said Java". Apparently in deference to Marco Polo's claim that Java Major was the largest island in the world, Alfonse gave the name Jave Mynore to the island of Java and the name La Grand Jave to the continental land to the south. Marco Polo's Java Minor, he called Samatrez (Sumatra). In La Cosmographie (1544), Alfonse said:

La Grand Jave is a land that goes as far as under the Antarctic Pole and from the Terre Australle in the west to the land of the Strait of Magellan on the eastern side. Some say that it is islands but from what I have seen of it, it is terre ferme [a continent] ... That called Jave Mynore is an island, but la Grand Jave is terre ferme.

=== Post-1600 ===
==== Luca Antara ====
Declaraçam de Malaca e India Meridional com o Cathay by Manuel Godinho de Eredia (1613), described what he called "Meridional India". In his book he relates about the voyage of Chiaymasiouro (or Chiay Masiuro), king of Damuth (Demak) in Java, to a Southern land called Luca Antara (or Lucaantara). (Note: Luca antara: i.e. Nusa antara, the southern land which Eredia claims to have discovered. The name Nusa antara occurs in the Pararaton, a Javanese historical work of about the 16th century. Blagden adopts Brandes' explanation that the expression Nusantara refers to the Archipelago in general. (JRASSB . No. 53. (1909). p. 144). Crawfurd says that the expression Nusa antara denoted Madura. Janssen thinks that Eredia's Luca antara was Australia or one of the islands off the north Australian coast: Hamy considers it to be Sumba. (Janssen. Malaca, Vlnde Meridionale ei le Cathay. (1882). pp. xi, xii). Major thinks it was Madura.) (Note: According to Ferrand, the word nusa is only used in Java, Madura, and Madagascar (nusi); elsewhere, island is generally represented by the name pulaw, pulo, or some dialectical variant thereof. (Journal Asiatique. Tome XX. (1920). p. 190). Nusa may be connected, through Sanskrit, with the Greek νῆσος (nesos). It would appear that the human tongue has a tendency to corrupt an "N" into an "L" thus "Nakhon" has become "Lakhon" (Ligor) and the Malay word nuri has become lory. Linschoten's map of the Eastern Seas contains the forms Lusa (Luca) and Nusa.) A brief description of this country is given in a letter written by Chiaymasiouro to the King of Pahang and in a certificate made by Pedro de Carvalhaes at Malacca on 4 October 1601.

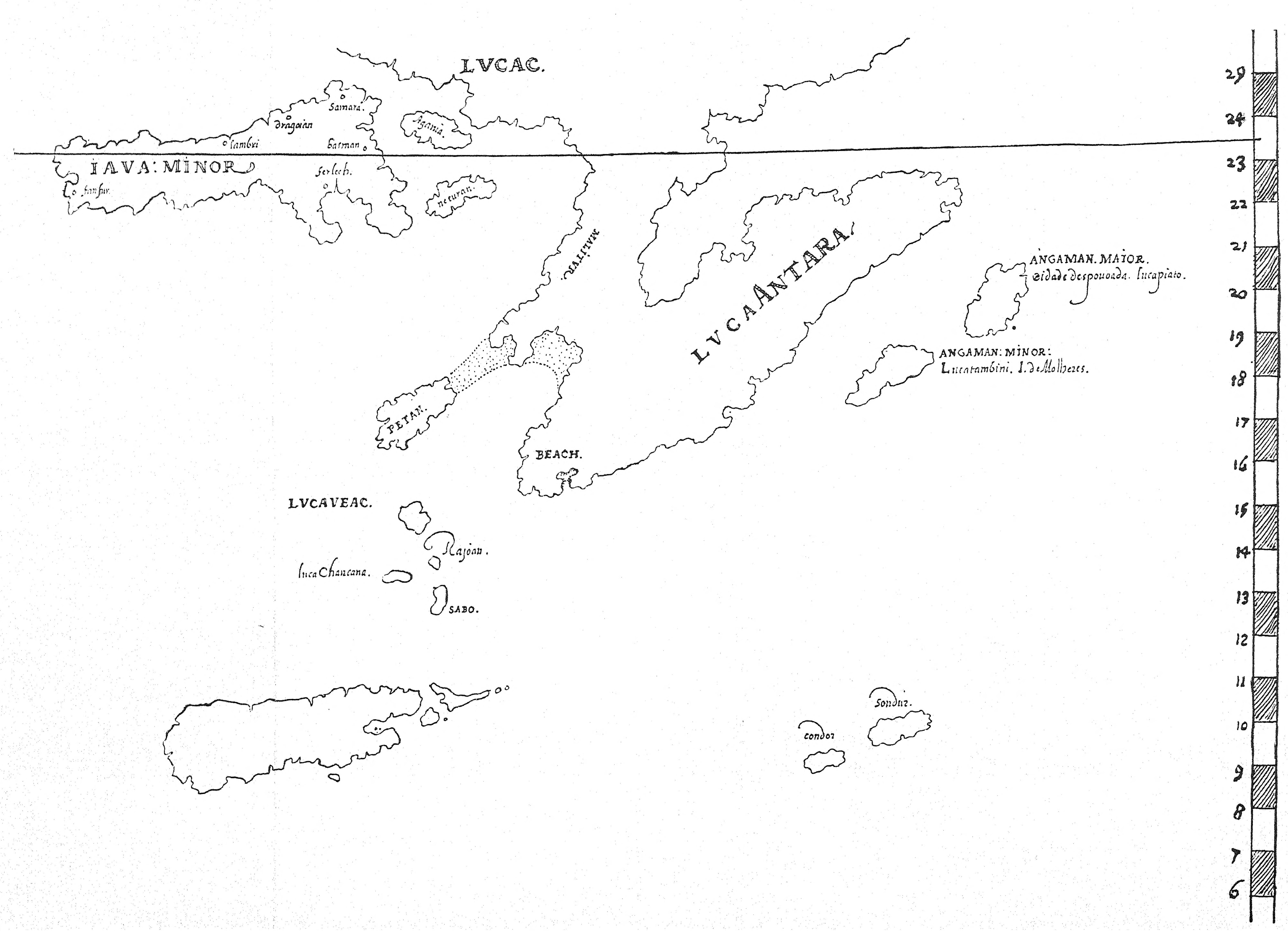
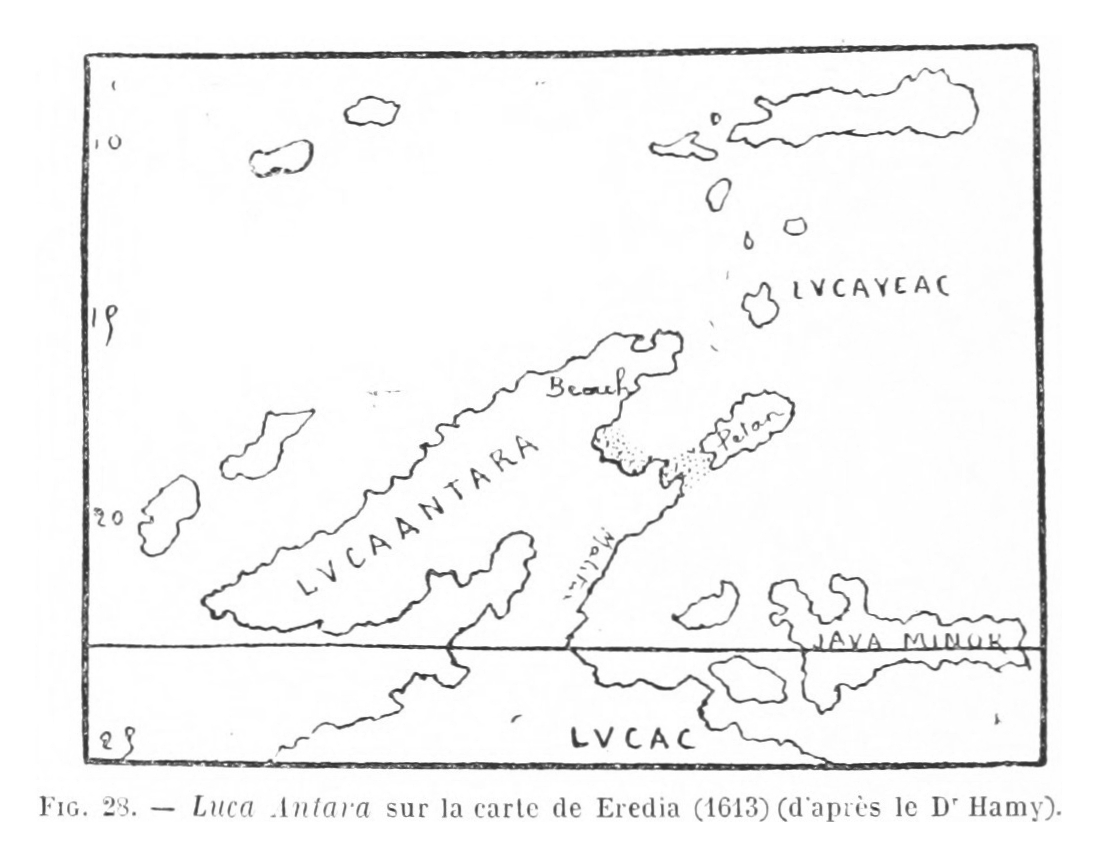
Luca antara and its surrounding areas (left to right):
- A map of Meridional India (Southern India); bearing a general resemblance to Mercator’s map of 1569. The South is at the top of the map.
- The same map rotated 180 degrees, redrawn by Armand Rainaud (1893).

In part 1 "Concerning the Meridional India" Eredia mentioned that the Meridional India consist of the mainland called Lucach, which has a peninsula named Beach, and a country called Lucaantara (or Luca Antara). In the east of Lucaantara is two small island Agania and Necuran, and a larger island called Java Minor. To the west is Angaman Minor or Luca Tambini (island of women), and Angaman Major or Lucapiatto. (Note: Luca Tambini: Nusa (island) + Bini (female, women). Lucapiatto: Nusa (island) + Piatu (desolate).) The lontares (lontar leaf texts) and annals of Java mention Meridional India and its commerce and trade.

In Report of Meridional India (1610) Eredia mentioned that in ancient times merchants carried on extensive intercourse and trade from Luca Antara with Java. This trade and commerce was destroyed for a period of 331 years; it ceased on account of wars and conflicts between the states. They were not able to communicate with each other until the year 1600 (this would mean that the communication was stopped in 1269). In that year, a boat from Lucaantara carried out of its course by a storm and landed in the port of Balambuam (Blambangan) in Java, where the occupants were well received.

The strangers from Lucaantara resembled the Javanese of Banten; but speak different language, which made Eredia believe that they were another type of Javanese. This incident excited Chiaymasiouro, which consequently embarked on a kelulus from Blambangan which has been equipped with oar and sail, to the south. After 12 days, he arrived at the port of Lucaantara, a peninsula or island 600 Spanish leagues in circumference. (Note: 2,100 miles (3,400 km), if a Spanish league is taken as 3.5 miles (5.6 km).) There he was received by the syahbandar (the king of the land was upriver in the interior, 8 days away), and stayed for several days.

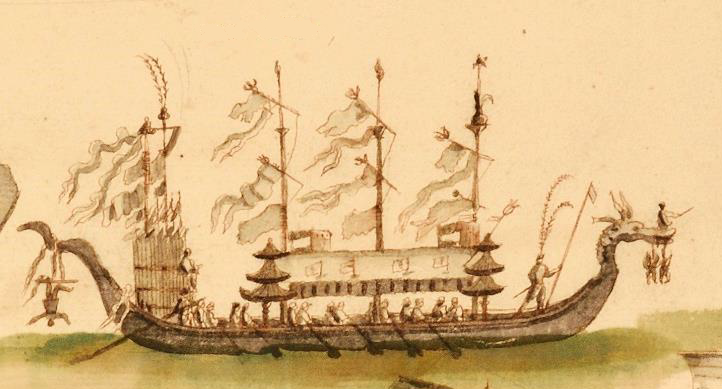
Drawing of a kelulus, the type of vessel used by Chiaymasiouro to reach Luca antara.

According to the itinerary of Chiaymasiouro, Lucaantara should be the general name for the peninsula, which has a distance of about 140 Spanish leagues (Note: 490 miles (790 km), if a Spanish league is taken as 3.5 miles (5.6 km).) from Blambangan. The account of Chiaymasiouro is as follows:

Having equipped myself for travel and supplied myself with necessary requirements, I embarked with some companions in a kelulus or vessel provided with oars, and set out from the port of Blambangan towards the south. After a voyage lasting 12 days, I reached the port of Lucaantara; there I disembarked and was received by the syahbandar with demonstrations of pleasure. Being fatigued with the voyage, I was unable to see the King of Lucaantara, who was staying up-river in the Hinterland, eight days' journey away.

The King was advised of my arrival and presented me with some handfulls of gold coins resembling in appearance the gold "Venetian" of Venice. (Note: The Venetian Zecchino, cecchino, or sequin, a gold coin present on the shore of India, and which still frequently turns up in treasure-trove, and in hoards. In the early part of the 15th century Niccolo de Conti mentions that in some parts of India, Venetian ducats, i.e. sequins, were present (Yule and Burnell. Hobson-Jobson. (1903). p. 193).) I was hospitably entertained as long as I remained in the country, and enjoyed the splendid freshness of the climate. I saw a considerable amount of gold, cloves, mace, white sandalwood, and other spices, as well as large quantities of foodstuffs of every kind which are produced in this country.

The island of Lucaantara is as large as Java, (Note: As large as Java island. If the accuracy of Chiaymasiouro be assumed, this disposes of the theory that he really visited some island of the Indonesian archipelago; Timor, the largest of them, is 1/4 the size of java; the islands off the north-west coast of Australia are comparatively insignificant in size.) in which Blambangan is situated. The people are Javanese, as in our own Java, though their language is somewhat different. They wear their hair hanging as far as the shoulder, while the head is girt with a fillet of hammered gold. The keris is ornamented with precious stones, like the keris with the curved scabbard in Bali.

Speaking generally, the Javanese people of Lucaantara spend their whole time in sports and pastimes: they are especially addicted to cock-fighting. When it was time to start on our voyage, I requested the syahbandar to inform the King that the monsoon was now favourable for my return to my own country. Provided with a stock of necessaries, I set out from Lucaantara, and after a few days' voyage arrived at the port of Blambangan, to the great astonishment of the whole of Java.

— Letter of Chiaymasiouro, the king of Damuth, to the king of Pahang

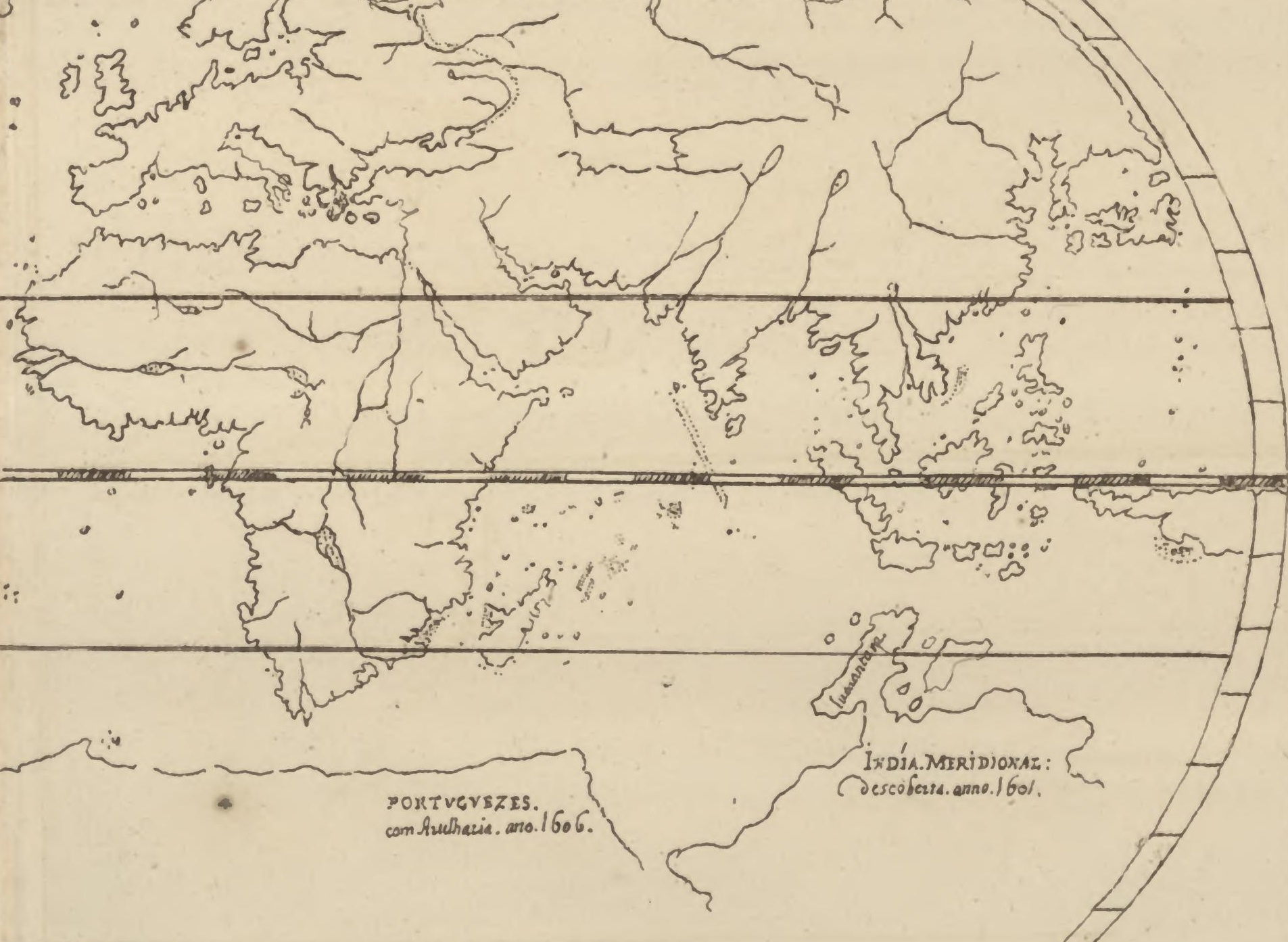
Typus Orbis Terrarum: Lucaantara is shown, India Meridional is mentioned to be discovered in 1601.

Soon after his arrival in 1601, he met an Alderman of Malacca, Pedro de Carvalhaes, who attested his arrival and his voyage:

I, Pedro de Carvalhaes, citizen and alderman of Malaca, certify that I met Chiaymasiouro, King of Damuth, at Surabaya, where in the course of conversation he related how "a rowing-boat from Lucaantara, driven out of its course by currents and ill winds or storms, reached the port of Blambangan": Actuated by curiosity, I gave orders for a calelus or boat provided with oars to be equipped with an adequate supply of all necessaries, and I set out with some companions from the port of Blambangan towards the south: After a voyage of 12 days, I reached the port of Lucaantara, where I was well received and entertained by the inhabitants, who are Javanese like those of Java Major (the true Java), similar in build and colour, and for the most part having similar interests, though their language is different. The island of Lucaantara has a compass of more than 600 leagues in circumference. I saw a considerable amount of gold, cloves, mace, white sandal-wood, and other spices, as well as large quantities of foodstuffs of every kind which are produced in this country. The earth is very fertile and the trees keep the climate cool. The country is organized into several kingdoms: And contains many populous towns and villages." The whole of the above account was given to me by Chiaymasiouro and his companions. This matter of Lucaantara was a subject of public notoriety in Surabaya and in other parts of Java Major. Since I have been asked for this information by the Descobridor Manuel Godinho de Eredia, in the interests of his voyage and for the advantage of the King's service, I swear by the Holy Gospels that this is the truth, and that it is my signature which appears below. At Malacca, on the 4th day of October in the year 1601. — Pedro de Carvalhaes

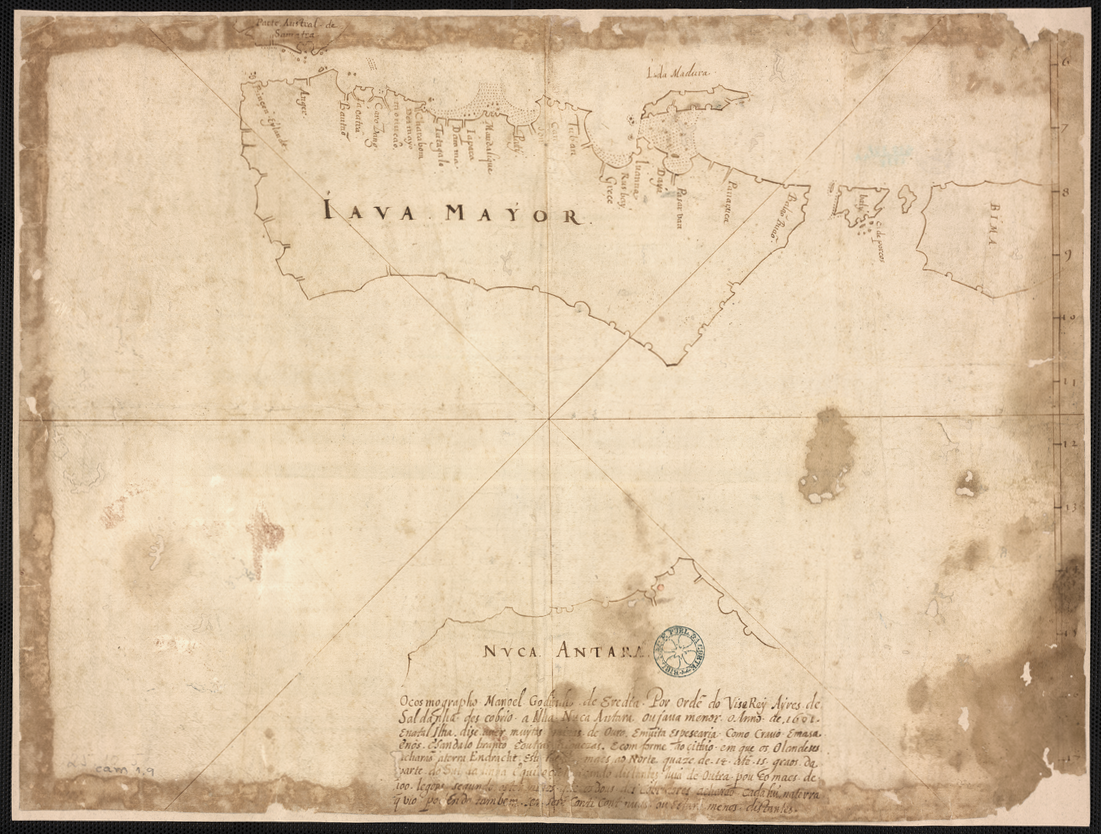
Map of Java and Nuca antara by Eredia.

After hearing his account, Eredia instructed one of his servants to travel to Java. In the bay of fishermen (in Southern coast of Java) this servant joined the fishermen there and crossed for 6 days to the coast of Luca Antara. He disembarked on a deserted coast, and did not observe any people. The servant remained there 3 days and confirmed the truth of Chiay Masiuro's account regarding the quantity of gold, and all kinds of metals and minerals, and precious stones, cloves, nutmegs, mace, and sandalwoods, and other riches. After 3 days he returned to the bay of the fishermen, and then gave information about his voyage in the year 1610. In Report of Meridional India (1610) Eredia mentioned that the Javanese people of Luca Antara in all of their customs and in figure resemble the Javanese of Sunda (West Java), (Note: Likely what he meant here is the Cirebonese people, an Austronesian ethnic group with mixed culture of Javanese and Sundanese (heavier influence from Javanese).) only a slight difference in the language, which he described as "much the same as between the Castilian and the Portuguese". The hair extends as far as the shoulders, the tonsure resembles the tonsure of Balinese people, with a curiously curved contour.

===== Objections =====
The statement of Lucaantara being Australia is objected by Richard Henry Major, in Archaeologia (1873). p. 243 et sqq. His objections is responded by J. V. Mills in Eredia's Description of Malaca, Meridional India, and Cathay (1930). pp. 188–190. The arguments is as follow:

Number	Major's argument	Response
1	The voyage of 600 miles (970 km) from Java to Australia is too far to be covered in 12 days.	Major assumes that the calelus was propelled solely by oars. But in the Report on Meridional India Eredia says that the boat had sails as well as oars; A speed of 50 miles (80 km) a day for a fast boat is below, not above, the average: A thousand years before this, I-tsing had sailed the 1,700 miles (2,700 km) from Canton to Palembang in 20 days (85 miles or 136.8 km a day). For comparison, the trepanger voyage from Makassar to Marriage (in Arnhem Land), is about 10–15 days voyage covering 1,600 km (990 mi), an average of 107–160 km (66–99 mi) a day.
2	Madura tallies with Eredia's description of Luca antara.	There are several arguments against this identification. (1) In order to reach Madura from the south-eastern extremity of Java, Chiaymasiouro would have to travel against the prevailing monsoon - an unlikely proceeding. (2) Chiaymasiouro, prince of Damuth (Demak) would almost certainly be recognised in Madura; it is unlikely that in purporting to make a voyage of discovery to an unknown land, he should travel to a place where he would be known. (3) Pedro de Carvalhaes points out that the matter was a subject of notoriety among the people of Surabaya but these people above all would be aware of any fraud, for Madura is only a mile from Surabaya at the nearest point. Incidentally, it may be mentioned that whereas Luca antara is stated to be as large as Java, Madura is about 1/30 the size of Java.
3	Major is unable to find the name Damuth on either old or modern maps of Java; the suggestion being that the name was coined by Eredia.	Mills thought it is reasonably certain that Damuth should be identified with Demak. Mills has ventured to identify Eredia's "Rapath" in the map of Malacca district with the modern name "Repah". Working on this analogy, "Damuth" should be called "Demah". Northeast of Semarang in Java, lies the ancient town of Demak (Damak), in a district which the map of Lavanha (1615) calls "Damo".
4	The purposelessness and transparent delusiveness of such a letter (as that from Chiaymasiouro to the King of Pahang) suggest to us the high probability of its being an entirely spurious production.	Mills said: "There is little cogency in the argument that because we do not know why a certain letter was written, therefore it was not written: Nor is it easy to see why the letter is transparently delusive. There would be nothing extra-ordinary about communication between East Java and the Peninsula: the Malay Annals (1612) record how the Pangeran of Surabaya paid a visit to Malacca and was entertained by Sultan Mahmud (Leyden's translation (1821) p. 272). Manrique (1640) says people were constantly travelling between Demak and Malaya."
5	Luca antara is provided with an elaborate and complex outline, even with rocks and shoals minutely laid down.	It seems unreasonable, however, to take these details any more seriously than the monsters which appear on many of the old maps.
6	The Luca antara of Eredia will in no way agree with what we know of Australia.	Mills said: "However powerful this argument may be to contradict the identity of Luca antara with Australia, the responsibility for the description of Luca antara rests, not with Eredia, but with Chiaymasiouro, just as the faithful servant must be responsible for the later journey made to Luca Antara in 1610."

== See also ==
- Makassan contact with Australia
- Trepanging, the act of collecting sea cucumber
- Patorani and padewakang, two types of perahu used for trepanging by Makassan
- Yolngu
- Theory of Portuguese discovery of Australia
- Baijini, a race of mythical or historical people mentioned in the Djanggawul song cycle of the Yolngu people of Arnhem Land.
- Marchinbar Island, location of a deposit of early coins in Australia
- Jave la Grande, according to Marco Polo, the largest island in the world.
