= Baijini =

Mythical people in Australian Aboriginal mythology

Baijini are a mythical people mentioned in the Djanggawul song cycle of the Yolngu people, an Aboriginal Australian people of Arnhem Land in the Northern Territory. Many speculations have arisen that try to link these mythical culture-bearers with historical immigrants from either China directly or Southern Asia.

== The name Baijini ==
According to Garry Trompf, the word "Baijini" itself is said to have been derived from a Makassarese root with the meaning "women". (Note: According to Swain, the presence of women among the Baijini was a defining difference between these mythic people and the historical Makassan trepang fishermen. The Baijini described in the legend cycle had sought to permanently establish themselves by bringing their wives and families (Swain 1993, p. 170).) Joseph Needham wondered if the word Baijini itself might not have been derived from Chinese bái rén (白人, "white people" (i.e., those with lighter skin than the Australian natives), běirén (北人, "northern people"), or even běijīngrén (北京人, "people from Beijing").

== The Baijini in Yolngu legend ==
In the Djanggawul song-cycles, it is told how, in the legendary land of Bu'ralgu somewhere beyond Groote Eylandt, there once lived three eternal beings called the Djanggawul: a brother, and his elder and younger sisters, together with a fourth man, Bralbral. Bu'ralgu itself had been a stepping stone in their journey south from an even more distant land. The four, after a series of ceremonies, rowed out from the island and, after several days, came to Arnhem Land, and followed the coast to Yalangbara (Jelaŋbara, aka Port Bradshaw). They then travelled overland until they came to Wabilinga Island and it was there that they came across the Baijini folk, cooking trepang at a site still marked by a tamarind grove. The Djanggawu claimed this place as their own, asking the Baijini to move off, which they did, either to the other side of the island or to the mainland.

The dreamtime landing site at Jelaŋbara was, according to the song cycle, also, later, a Baijini settlement.

== Theories ==
It has been argued that the account of the Baijini in the Aboriginal folklore are in fact a mythological reflection of the experiences of some Aboriginals who have traveled to Sulawesi with the Macassans and came back. If there was indeed an historical reality behind the Baijini mentioned in Yolŋu myth, the origin and timing of those Asians who would have served as the prototype for this mythological people remains lost in the past. It has been suggested that they may be identified with the Sama-Bajau, or Sea Gypsies, the fishing folk of South East Asia who traveled with their families.

The Australian anthropologist Ronald Berndt studied the people of Yirrkala and Milingimbi Island in the late 1940s. In his work on their mythic traditions, published in 1952 he wrote:

the Baijini, although partially mythological are, rather, historical; for they are said to have been pre-Macassans, primarily traders and aliens to the coast, and not in any way creative as were the Djanggawul. They are, however, treated in the myth as if contemporary with these Ancestral Beings.

Berndt added that similar to the Makassan trepang fishermen in Australia known to the historians, the Baijini of the Djanggawul myth are said to be "cooking trepang, where the tamarind trees stand to-day". Tamarind trees are thought to have been introduced to Australia by the Makassans. According to interpretations of the legends, the Baijini not only built stone houses (balapathu) but also cultivated rice paddies.

The following year the sinologist C.P. FitzGerald mentioned the possibility of pre-European Chinese visits to Australia in an article, which conjecture a possible early Chinese presence in northern Australia, by mentioning a Chinese statue which had been dug up in 1879 near Darwin.

== Baijini and Shou lao ==
Fitzgerald's allusion was a figurine which had been dug up 4 feet down among the roots of a banyan tree by Chinese natives, under the direction of a Public Works superintendent, Mr. Strawbridge, who was overseeing the clearance of dense jungle for the construction of a road at a site called Doctor's Gully in Palmerston just outside of the town of Darwin in 1879. The gully leads down to a sandy cove, and is one of the two sites where fresh water can be found in Darwin. The figurine was mounted on an animal, identified as either a gazelle or antelope. It came into the possession of Thomas Worsnop who reproduced a drawing of it in his 1897 work on Aboriginal arts and manufactures. Worsnop described it as fashioned from a type of jade, though later scholars have stated it is made of soapstone, and stated that all inquiries he had made to determine what it represented had failed to clarify its origin. Eventually, In a paper read before the Royal Society of South Australia on 8 March 1928, Norman Tindale identified it as a Chinese deity from the Tang dynasty, a high backdating which elicited Fitzgerald's skepticism. The deity in question, associated with Canopus, is the Old Man of the South Pole, Shòu lǎo, (壽老), the Chinese god of longevity who was one of the Sānxīng, or three stellar deities, in Chinese religion.

Peter Worsley took up Fitzgerald's remark in 1955, making a succinct synthesis of the overall scholarship regarding pre-European contacts with northern Australia. In his essay, he mentioned the Baijini myths current among the Yolngu:

In eastern Arnhem Land, moreover, the aborigines are quite categorical in their statements that the Macassarese were preceded another people they term the Baijini. These people were different from the later Macassarese, though like the Macassarese, they came for the purpose of collecting trepang, a sea-slug which abounds in the shallow waters off the Arnhem Land coast.. The Baijini had an advanced technology: they possessed hand-looms, were agriculturalists, and built huts during their stays in Australia. One of the more interesting comments made about the Baijini is a reference to their light-coloured skins. Whilst it is possible that these people may have been Chinese, the trade in trepang was usually carried out by non-Chinese, the Chinese middlemen coming into the picture at Koepang and other such markets. Fitzgerald suggests that any Chinese voyages would most likely have been scientific and exploratory expeditions rather than trading expeditions. The Baijini, then, may have been another Indonesian people, and not necessarily Chinese.'

J.V.G. Mills, in a note to a translation of a Ming dynasty account by Ma Huan concerning Chinese voyages at that time, suggested that if, of the many Asian people whose visits might have engendered a legend about the Baijini, they were Chinese, the likely explanation would be that it referred to some vessel detached from the fleet of Zheng He, which would have sailed south from Timor.

== Modern theories ==
Anthropologist Ian McIntosh has interpreted the cycle's mention of the Baijini as a fictional history devised by the Yolngu, centered on Warramiri clanland at Dholtji (Note: The word may be of Portuguese origin but means 'hidden gift' (McIntosh 2008, p. 170).) in the Cape Wilberforce peninsula. According to this theory, the function of the Baijini stories was to provide a mythic charter to govern trade relations, originally, with Asians. McIntosh argues that Birrinydji, in his twin roles as a powerful sea-captain and blacksmith in the Dreamtime, was the key figure in legends that encode the problems arising from primal encounters with outsiders. It was he who is said to have drawn by his magnetic presence and actions far-flung peoples to migrate to Arnhem Land's coasts. The name 'Birronydji' itself appears to reflect a term for freebooting Portuguese crusaders.

This Birrinydji was said to have the power to morph at will from being white to black. His people wore sarongs, distinctive whale-tail shaped hats and their craft flew a flag banded with blue, red and blue stripes. These features are correlated by McIntosh with a Macassan story that narrates how a group of Gowans sailed south to find refuge in Arnhem Land after the Macassan Kingdom of Gowa was attacked by a joint Dutch-Bugis force in 1667. Yet elements of still earlier encounters seem to be embedded in these tales since what appear to be allusions to Islamic and Portuguese visits are also present in the myth cycle. For example, a moon-dwelling deity called 'Allah' is alluded to in funerary rites. Pre-Macassan men in 'mirrors' (shining armour) are said to have rallied troops on Dholtji's shore and the Warramiri clan elders referred to Dholtji as Mecca.

Beneath these possible traces in myth suggestive of some pre-modern contact with Southeast Asian traders, the Baijini strarum of legend, in this light, would appear to evoke specifically an older pre-Macassan order. One index of this is that Dholtji songs fail to mention precisely what the Macassan traders sought, trepang. The Birrinydji cycle speaks of a tall bearded people with a king, Luki, the admiral of Birrinydji's fleet Lela and his boat's captain Djammangi. Whatever the historical reality, McIntosh concluded, functionally in these Yolngu traditions, the contrast between a golden age of wealth, reciprocity and law-giving, and a subsequent period of seafaring Macassan trepang hunters, functions in counterpoise to mediate between two distinct realms, the sacred and profane spheres to enable thinking about their world's relationship with a foreign order. The contrast between the two modes would serve as a metaphorical system for negotiating forms of reconciliation between their traditional order with the exclusive land rights of clan territory underwritten by sacred stories of origins, and the modern world of the whites who seek purchase on their land and access to Arnhem Land resources.

== Recent mentions ==
The Chinese origin hypothesis for the Baijini has been recently revived by the American journalist Louise Levathes.

== See also ==
- Makassan contact with Australia
- Trepanging, the act of collecting sea cucumber
- Patorani and padewakang, two types of perahu used for trepanging by Makassan
- Yolngu

== Sources ==
- Berndt, Ronald M. (2004) [First published 1952]. Djanggawul: An Aboriginal Religious Cult of North-Eastern Arnhem Land. Routledge & Kegan Paul. ISBN 978-1-136-53864-3.
- Berndt, Ronald M.; Berndt, Catherine (1947). "Discovery of Pottery in North-Eastern Arnhem Land". The Journal of the Royal Anthropological Institute of Great Britain and Ireland. 77 (2): 133–138. doi:10.2307/2844477. JSTOR 2844477.
- Berndt, Ronald M.; Berndt, Catherine (1954). Arnhem Land: its history and its people. F. W. Cheshire. p. 34.
- Clausen, Lisa (14 September 2013). "Out of Africa". The Sydney Morning Herald.
- Cross, Jack (2011). Great Central State: The Foundation of the Northern Territory. Wakefield Press. ISBN 978-1-862-54877-0.
- Fitzgerald, C. P. (1953). "A Chinese Discovery of Australia?". In Moore, T. Inglis (ed.). Australia Writes: An anthology. F. W. Cheshire. pp. 75–84.
- Levathes, Louise (2014). When China Ruled the Seas: The Treasure Fleet of the Dragon Throne, 1405–1433. Open Road Media. ISBN 978-1-504-00736-8.
- Ma Huan (1970) [First published 1433]. Feng, Ch'eng-Chün; Mills, J. V. G. (eds.). Ying-yai Sheng-lan: 'The Overall Survey of the Ocean's Shores'. Hakluyt Society/Cambridge University Press. ISBN 978-052101032-0.
- McIntosh, Ian S (2006). "A Treaty with the Macassans? Burrumarra and the Dholtji Ideal". The Asia Pacific Journal of Anthropology. 7 (2): 153–172. doi:10.1080/14442210600763181. S2CID 159897713.
- McIntosh, Ian S (2008). "Pre-Macassans at Dholtji? Exploring one of north-east Arnhem Land's great conundrums" (PDF). In Sutton, Peter; Veth, Peter; Neale, Margo (eds.). Strangers on the Shore: Early Coastal Contact in Australia. National Museum of Australia. pp. 165–180. ISBN 978-1-876-94488-9 – via ResearchGate.
- McIntosh, Ian S (2009). ""Why Umbella Killed His Master": Aboriginal Reconciliation and the Australian wild dog (canis lupus dingo)". In Waldau, Paul; Patton, Kimberley (eds.). A Communion of Subjects: Animals in Religion, Science, and Ethics. Columbia University Press. pp. 360–370. ISBN 978-0-231-13643-3.
- McIntosh, Ian S. (2013). "Unbirri's pre-Macassan legacy, or how the Yolngu became black". In Clark, Marshall; May, Sally K. (eds.). Macassan History and Heritage: Journeys, Encounters and Influences. Australian National University. pp. 95–106. ISBN 978-1-922-14496-6. JSTOR j.ctt3fgjzc.8.
- Needham, Joseph; Wang, Ling; Lu, Gwei-djen (1971). Physics and Physical Technology: Civil Engineering and Nautics. Science and Civilisation in China. Vol. 4:3. Cambridge University Press. ISBN 0-521-07060-0.
- Swain, Tony (February 1991). "The Earth Mother from Northern Waters". History of Religions. 30 (3): 223–260. doi:10.1086/463227. S2CID 162308386.
- Swain, Tony (1993). A place for strangers: towards a history of Australian Aboriginal being. Cambridge University Press. ISBN 978-0-521-44691-4.
- Swain, Tony (2005). "Australia". In Trompf, Garry; Swain, Tony (eds.). The Religions of Oceania. Routledge. ISBN 978-1-134-92851-4.
- Tindale, Norman Barnett (1974). Aboriginal Tribes of Australia: Their Terrain, Environmental Controls, Distribution, Limits, and Proper Names (PDF). Australian National University. ISBN 978-0-708-10741-6.
- Worsley, Peter M. (April 1955). "Early Asian Contacts with Australia". Past & Present (7): 1–11. doi:10.1093/past/7.1.1. JSTOR 650169.
- Worsnop, Thomas (1897). The prehistoric arts, manufacturers, works, weapons, etc., of the aborigines of Australia (PDF). Adelaide: C.E. Bristow, Government Printer – via Internet Archive.
