= Wurrwurrwuy stone arrangements =

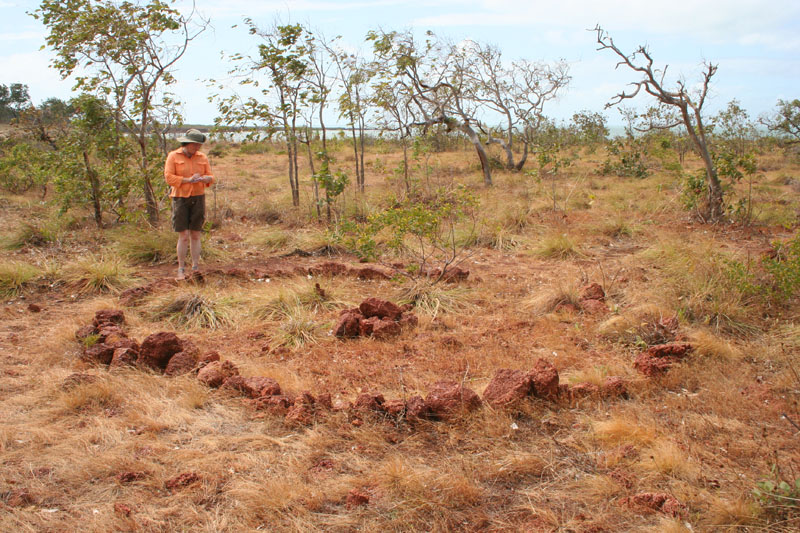
- Stone arrangement, 2005

- Location within Northern Territory
- 12.3311°S 136.9328°E
- Location: Yirrkala, Northern Territory, Australia

Australian National Heritage List
- Official name: Wurrwurrwuy
- Type: Listed place (Indigenous)
- Designated: 9 August 2013
- Reference no.: 106088

Wurrwurrwuy stone arrangements is a heritage-listed indigenous site at Yirrkala, Northern Territory, Australia. It is also known as Wurrwurrwuy. It was added to the Northern Territory Heritage Register on 15 August 2007 and to the Australian National Heritage List on 9 August 2013.

== History ==
During his circumnavigation of Australia in 1802–1803 Matthew Flinders found bamboo frameworks, lines of stone fireplaces, pieces of cloth and the stumps of trees cut down with metal axes, at a number of places along the coast of the Gulf of Carpentaria. He interpreted this as evidence of Chinese visits to this part of Australia. On 16 February 1803, he met a fleet of Macassan praus anchored in the waters off the English Company Islands group. It was here that he learnt from Pobassoo, the captain of the fleet, that Macassan praus came to the coast of northern Australia every year on the north-west monsoon winds to collect and dry trepang or bêche de mer which they then sold to the Chinese.

=== Interactions between Aboriginal people and Macassans ===
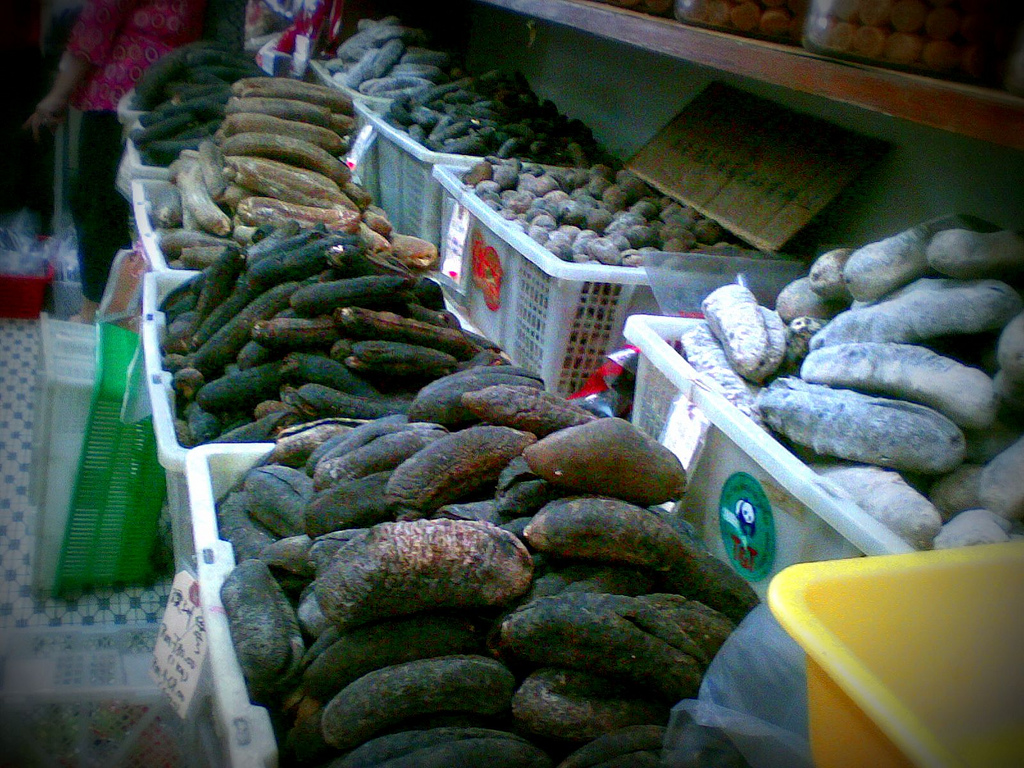
Dried sea cucumber

Flinders' encounter with Pobassoo is the first Australian record of the north Australian trepang industry. Macassans had probably started to visit the northern Australian coast before 1650 but Dutch East India Company documents suggest that the intensive catching and processing of trepang for the Chinese market probably began in about 1750. Macassan involvement in the industry ended in 1906 when the South Australian Government, which administered the Northern Territory at that time, restricted the issuing of licenses to locally owned vessels.

The distribution of tamarind trees (an exotic species), trepang processing sites and the depiction of Macassan praus and other items of Macassan material culture in rock art provide direct material evidence for the Macassan trepang industry. Trepang processing sites are found on the Kimberley coast and on the Arnhem Land and Groote Eylandt coasts. While depictions of praus and items of Macassan material culture are not unusual in the rock art of Arnhem Land and offshore islands like Groote Eylandt, Chasm Island and Bickerton Island, such images are rare in the Kimberley. These data and Aboriginal oral tradition suggest that the relationship between Macassans and Aborigines in the Kimberley was different to the relationship between Macassans and Yolngu with the former relationship characterised by hostility.

Aboriginal people in Arnhem adopted a number of items of Macassan material culture including dugout canoes and iron. This transformed Aboriginal economies so they had an increased marine focus. This is shown by the large numbers of dugong and turtle bones in middens on the Coburg Peninsula that date from the time of the Macassan trepang industry and an increased marine focus on Groote Eylandt. There is also evidence for changes in the way Aboriginal people used space and evidence for changes in their exchange networks.

Aboriginal people living in Arnhem Land incorporated the memory of Macassans into their social and cultural life. For example, Macassans and their voyages are important in some ceremonies and song cycles where songs may reference Muslim prayers. Oral tradition also provides accounts of Aboriginal people working for Macassans on trepang sites and undertaking voyages on praus to the Celebes and further afield. The close relationship between Macassans and Aborigines is reflected in the large number of Macassan borrowed words found in Aboriginal languages in Arnhem Land and on Groote Eylandt which includes words for different parts of praus and the rigging on these vessels. Aboriginal people in these areas use the Macassan names for some parts of praus and their rigging that are depicted in rock art.

=== The stone pictures at Wurrwurrwuy ===
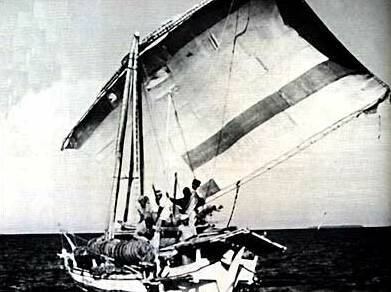
A type of Macassan perahu, the padewakang

The stone pictures at Wurrwurrwuy are part of the story of Macassan Aboriginal interactions in Arnhem Land. They lie within the territory of the Lamomirri clan but on the death of the last responsible Lamomirri man they were taken into the custody of the Gumatj clan. A father and son, Yumbul and Dhatalamirri, created the pictures, probably in the second half of the nineteenth century. Oral histories recorded in 1967 indicate that Yumbul, possibly with the aid of some of his fellow clansmen, made the first pictures. The site was entrusted to his second son, Dhatalamirri, who added further pictures at a later date.

The stone pictures created by Yumbul and Dhatalamirri depict Macassan praus, canoes, houses with multiple rooms, fireplaces where trepang were boiled, trepang drying houses, a house for storing wood, and stones for sharpening iron knives. There are also pictures of an Aboriginal fish trap and Aboriginal dwellings that may not have been made by the father and son.

When Macknight and Grey recorded the site in 1967, two Aboriginal informants, Munggurrawuy (a Gumatj custodian) and Mawalan (a relative of Yumbul and Dhatalamirri), were able to explain how the divisions within the pictures of the praus represented different parts of the vessel: the crews' quarters, the galley, the eating space, the store and the water tank. They also provided Macassan names for the different parts of praus, the rudder, bowsprit and the tripod mast with its sail and rigging. These pictures show that Yolngu visited trepang sites and spent enough time on praus to learn the various parts of the vessels and where the crew lived and ate. This is consistent with historical records showing that Aboriginal people travelled in praus to the Celebes, a trip that was made by Munggurrawuy's father. The custodians told Macknight and Gray that Wurrwurrwuy was a legacy from the past with no sacred associations. They felt that it was useful as it provided younger men with some idea of the way of life of Macassans who had come to the area to collect trepang. The pictures are a permanent reminder of Yolngu knowledge about this past.

== Description ==
Map showing the Australian National Heritage List boundaries, 2013

Wurrwurrwuy stone arrangements is at about 1.41ha, 10 km south east of Yirrkala, being those parts of Northern Territory Portions 1044 and 1692 designated Northern Territory Portion 6647(A).

The stone pictures at Wurrwurrwuy that depict aspects of the Macassan trepang industry lie on an open rocky shelf about ten kilometres south east of Yirrkala in Eastern Arnhem Land, Northern Territory. The area is bounded to the north by a small creek: on the west by a strip of dense coastal vine thicket and to the east and south by the sea. The vegetation on the shelf is low grass and stunted shrubs.

The stone pictures cover an area of about 80 metres by 70 metres. They are divided into three groups with a few outlying features. The group of pictures at the southern end of the site mainly depicts Macassan subjects in simple outlines. The northern group also depicts Macassan subjects, but the style is different, with stones of different sizes used to give weight to parts of the pictures. The western group comprises a mixture of Macassan and Aboriginal subjects.

=== Condition ===
When first recorded in the 1960s there was some minor damage to the site from buffalo mainly at the southern end, but there has been no evidence for subsequent deterioration. The site has been fenced and paths and interpretive signs have been installed. The place is maintained by Dhimurru Corporation Aboriginal Rangers.

The stone pictures at Wurrwurrwuy are nationally significant as a rare example of stones arranged to depict secular subjects rather than the arranged stones being associated with ceremony and the sacred. The stone pictures depict a range of subjects including Aboriginal camps, fish traps and images relating to the Macassan trepang industry including praus, canoes, the stone fireplaces where trepang were boiled and Macassan houses. The depictions of praus at Wurrwurrwuy show the internal arrangements of the vessels, which is rare in Aboriginal depictions of praus in any medium. The creators of the stone pictures would have acquired their knowledge of the internal arrangement of praus during visits to, or voyages on, such vessels.

Wurrwurrwuy stone arrangements was listed on the Australian National Heritage List on 9 August 2013 having satisfied the following criteria.

Criterion B: Rarity

The stone pictures at Wurrwurrwuy have outstanding heritage value to the nation as a rare example of stones arranged to depict utilitarian and secular objects rather than the arranged stones being associated with ceremony and the sacred. It is also a place with rare depictions of the internal arrangements in praus. This is knowledge that the creators would have acquired either during visits to or voyages on such vessels.
