= Makassan contact with Australia =

Historical intergroup relations

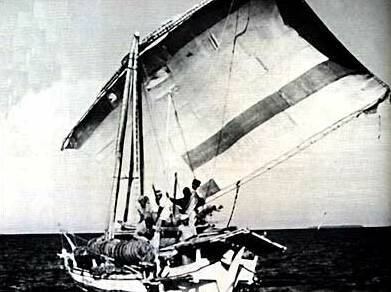
A type of Makassan perahu, the patorani

Makassarese merchants and Sama-Bajau fishermen from Southern Sulawesi in Indonesia began visiting the coast of Northern Australia sometime around the middle of the 18th century, first in the Kimberley region, and some decades later in Arnhem Land. They were men who collected and processed trepang (also known as sea cucumber), a marine invertebrate prized for its culinary value and medicinal properties in Chinese markets. The term Makassan (or Macassan) is generally used to apply to all trepangers who came to northern Australia, referring to both Makassarese themselves as well as the Sama-Bajau that followed suit.

== Fishing and processing of trepang ==
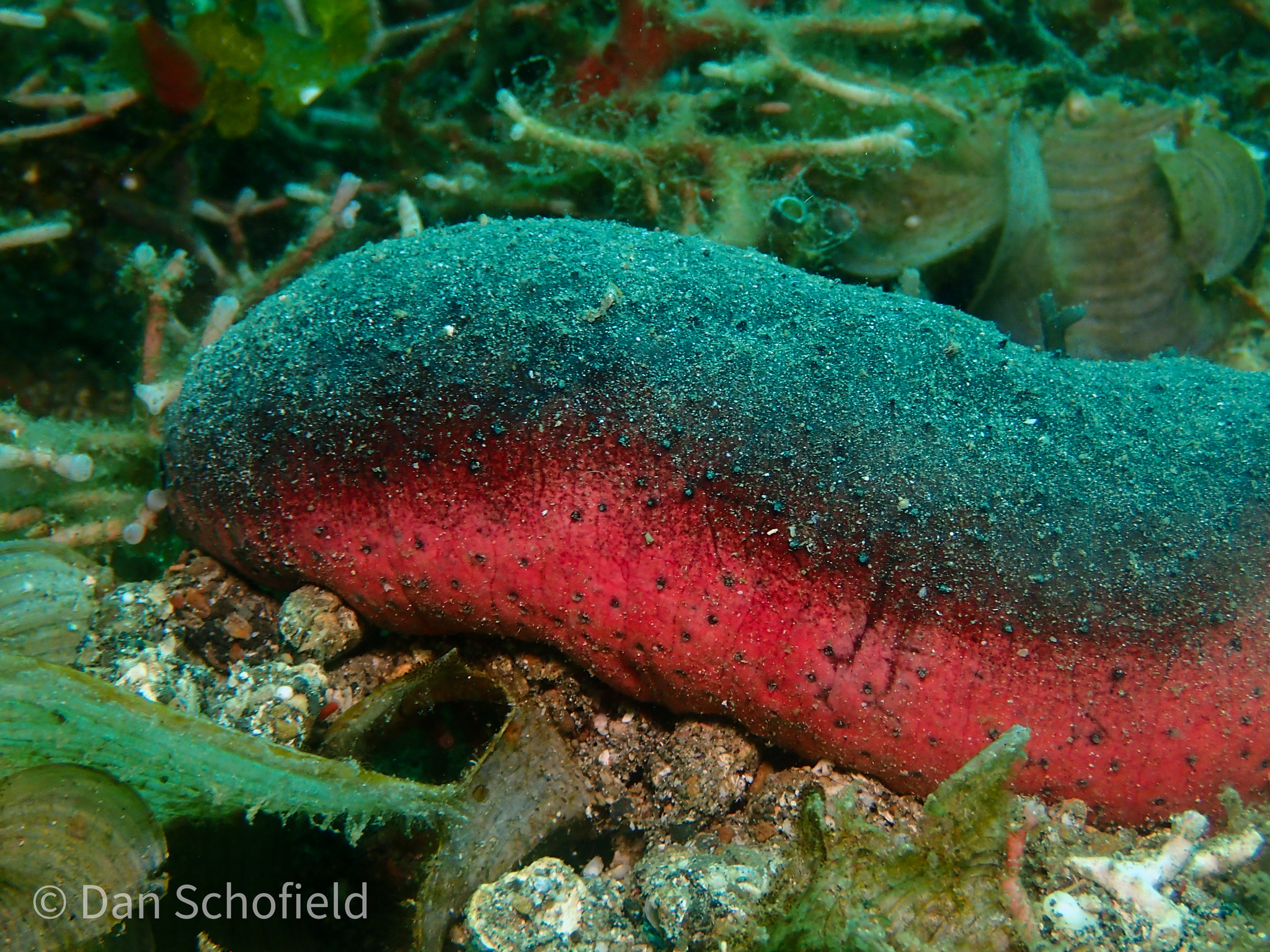
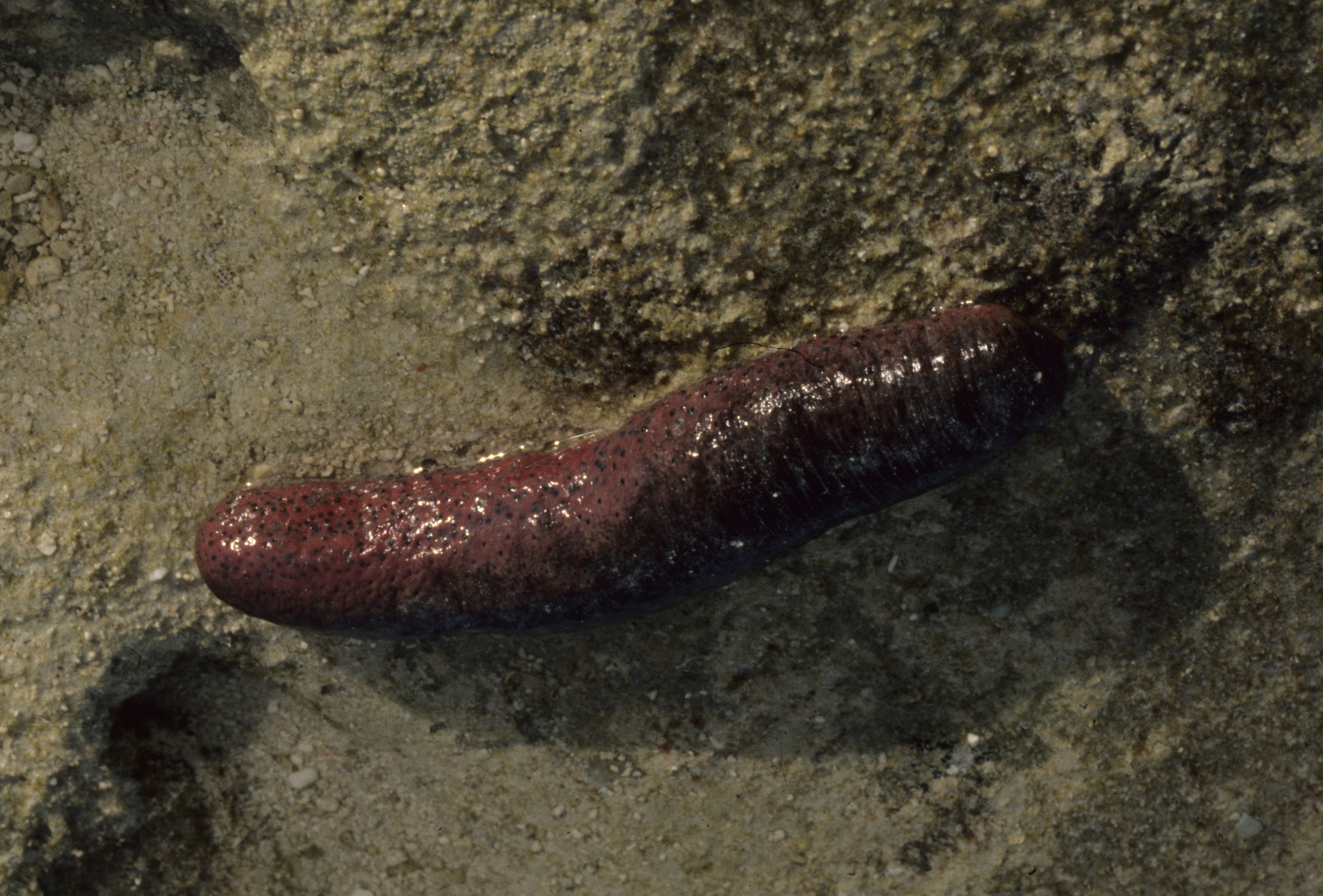
Edible sea cucumber (Holothuria edulis) in the Lembeh Strait, Indonesia (left) and the Coral Sea, Australia (right)

The creature and the food product are commonly known in English as sea cucumber, bêche-de-mer in French, gamat in Malay, while Makassarese has 12 terms covering 16 different species. One of the Makassar terms, for trepang, taripaŋ, entered the Aboriginal languages of the Cobourg Peninsula, as tharriba in Marrku, as jarripang in Mawng or otherwise as darriba.

Trepang live on the sea floor and are exposed at low tide. Fishing was traditionally done by hand, spearing, diving or dredging. The catch was placed in boiling water before being dried and smoked, to preserve the trepang for the journey back to Makassar and other South East Asian markets. Trepang is still valued by Chinese communities for its jelly-like texture, its flavour-enhancing properties, and as a stimulant and aphrodisiac. Matthew Flinders made a contemporary record of how trepang was processed when he met Pobasso, a chief of a Makassan fleet in February 1803.

== Voyage to Marege' and Kayu Jawa ==
Trepanging fleets began to visit the northern coasts of Australia from Makassar in southern Sulawesi, Indonesia, from at least 1720 and possibly earlier. Campbell Macknight's classic study of the Makassan trepang industry accepts the start of the industry as about 1720, with the earliest recorded trepang voyage made in 1751. However, Regina Ganter of Griffith University notes that a Sulawesi historian suggests a commencement date for the industry of about 1640. Ganter also notes that for some anthropologists, the extensive influence of the trepang industry on the Yolngu people suggests a longer period of contact. Arnhem Land Aboriginal rock art, dated by archaeologists in 2010, appears to provide further evidence of Makassan contact in the mid-1600s. Based on radiocarbon dating for apparent prau (boat) designs in Aboriginal rock art, some scholars have proposed contact from as early as the 1500s. A Makassarese legend suggested that the first cargo of Australian trepang were brought to Makassar by leaders who had previously escaped the Dutch conquest of the Sultanate of Gowa.

With the recent growing evidence of pre-1700s Makassan activity, some scholars have proposed the following model, with 4 phases of interaction:

Phase 1, (c.1000–1550 CE): Tentative earliest contact between Aboriginal Australians and pioneering Austronesian speaking voyagers of unknown origins.

Phase 2, (c.1550–1750 CE): Semi-regular voyages are made between Island Southeast Asia. Trade and trepanging activities commence. This phase would align with the growing evidence of pre-1700s Makassan activities.

Phase 3, (c.1750–1880 CE): The trepang industry becomes well established and begins to be documented in historical sources, as described by Macknight and others.

Phase 4, (c.1880–1907 CE): The trepang industry declines as colonial restrictions increase, and ceases after licensing, customs and border controls effectively prevent further Makassan voyages; the last recorded fleet departed in 1907.

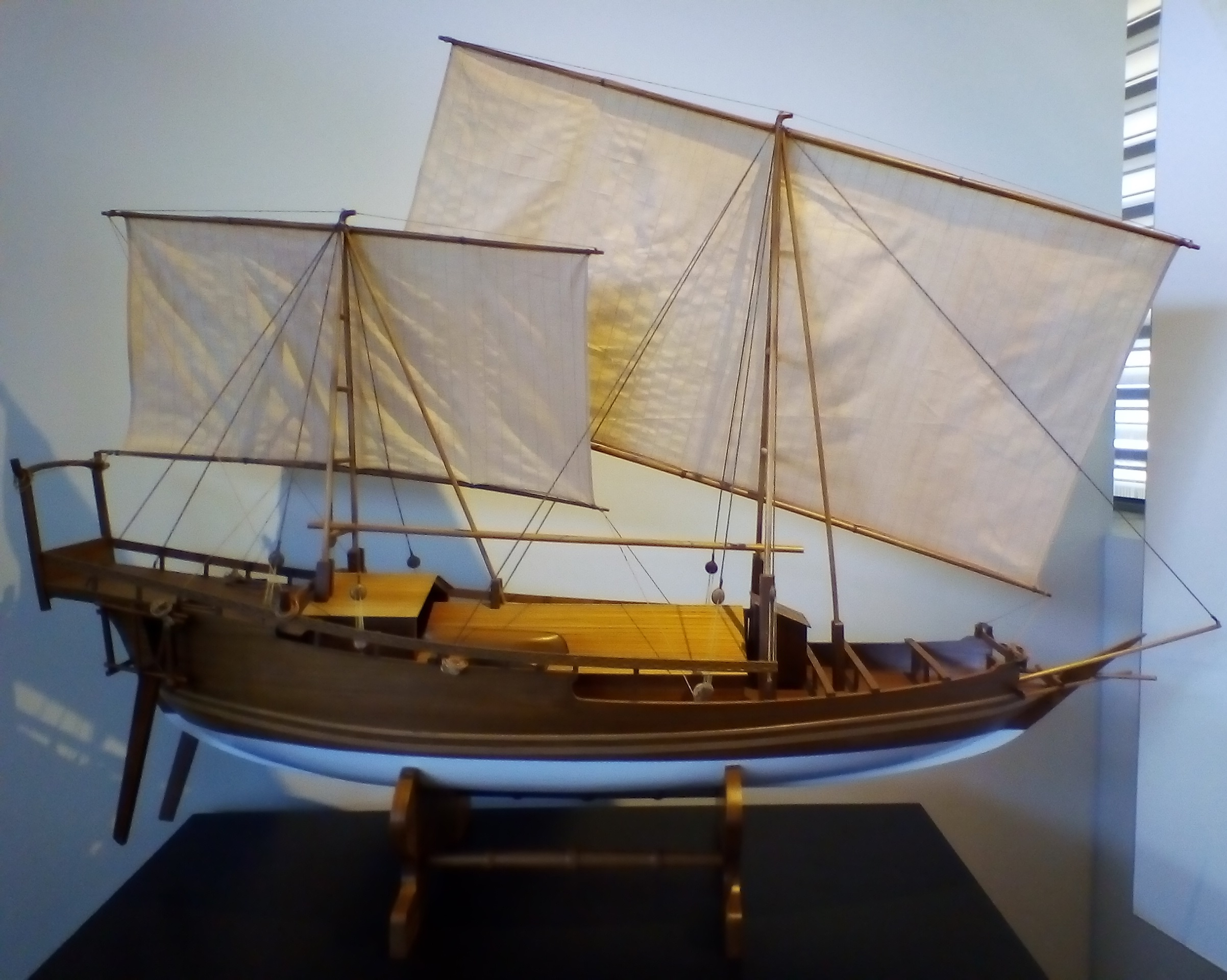
Model of Makassan perahu, Islamic Museum of Australia

At the height of the trepang industry, the Makassan ranged thousands of kilometres along Australia's northern coasts, arriving with the north-west monsoon each December. Makassan perahu or praus could carry a crew of thirty members, and Macknight estimated the total number of trepangers arriving each year as about one thousand. The Makassan crews established themselves at various semi-permanent locations on the coast, to boil and dry the trepang before the return voyage home, four months later, to sell their cargo to Chinese merchants. Marege' was the Makassan name for Arnhem Land (meaning "Wild Country"), a historical region of the Northern Territory of Australia, from the Cobourg Peninsula to Groote Eylandt in the Gulf of Carpentaria. Kayu Jawa was the name for the fishing grounds in the Kimberley region of Western Australia, from Napier Broome Bay to Cape Leveque. Other important fishing areas included West Papua, Sumbawa, Timor, and Selayar.

Matthew Flinders, in his circumnavigation of Australia in 1803, met a Makassan trepang fleet near present-day Nhulunbuy. He communicated at length with a Makassan captain, Pobasso, through his cook, who was also a Malay, and learned of the extent of the trade from this encounter. Ganter writes that there were at most "1,000 Macassans" compared to the almost "7,000 British nestled into Sydney Cove and Newcastle". French explorer Nicholas Baudin also encountered twenty-six large perahu off the northern coast of Western Australia in the same year.

The British settlements of Fort Dundas and Fort Wellington were established as a result of Phillip Parker King's contact with Makassan trepangers in 1821.

Using Daeng Rangka, the last Makassan trepanger to visit Australia, lived well into the twentieth century, and the history of his voyages are well documented. He first made the voyage to northern Australia as a young man. He suffered dismasting and several shipwrecks, and had generally positive but occasionally conflicting relationships with Indigenous Australians. He was the first trepanger to pay the South Australian government (at the time the jurisdiction that administered the Northern Territory) for a trepanging licence in 1883, an impost that made the trade less viable. The trade continued to dwindle toward the end of the 19th century, due to the imposition of customs duties and licence fees and probably compounded by overfishing. Rangka commanded the last Makassar perahu, which left Arnhem Land in 1907.

== Physical evidence of Makassan contact ==
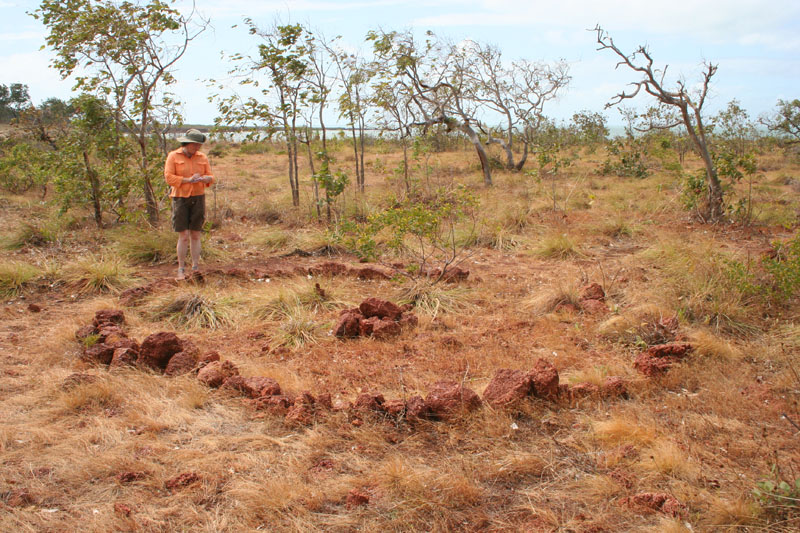
Makassan stone arrangement near Yirrkala, Northern Territory

There is significant evidence of contact with Makassan fishers in examples of Indigenous Australian rock art and bark painting of northern Australia, with the Makassan perahu a prominent feature.

=== Northern Territory ===
Archaeological remains of Makassar processing plants from the 18th and 19th centuries are still at Port Essington, Anuru Bay, and Groote Eylandt, along with stands of the tamarind trees introduced by the Makassan. Macknight and others note that excavations and development in these areas have revealed pieces of metal, broken pottery and glass, coins, fish-hooks and broken clay pipes related to this trade. Macknight notes that much of the ceramic material found suggests a nineteenth-century date. (Note: At the same time he has warned against accepting radiocarbon dates from trepang processing fireplaces. These apparently give an anomalous date of 800 years before present.)

In January 2012, a swivel gun found two years before at Dundee Beach near Darwin was widely reported by web news sources and the Australian press to be of Portuguese origin. However initial analysis by the Museum and Art Gallery of the Northern Territory in 2012 indicated that it is of Southeast Asian origin, likely from Makassar. There is nothing in its chemical composition, style, or form that matches Portuguese breech-loading swivel guns. The museum holds seven guns of South East Asian manufacture in its collections. Another swivel gun of South East Asian manufacture, found in Darwin in 1908, is held by the South Australian Museum, and is also possibly of Makassan origin.

The Wurrwurrwuy stone arrangements at Yirrkala, which are listed as heritage monuments, depict aspects of Makassan trepanging, including details of the vessels' internal structures.

=== Western Australia ===
In 1916, two bronze cannons were found on a small island in Napier Broome Bay, on the northern coast of Western Australia. Scientists at the Western Australian Museum in Fremantle have made a detailed analysis and have determined that these weapons are swivel guns and almost certainly of late 18th century Makassan, rather than European, origin. Flinders' account confirms that the Makassans he met were personally armed and their perahus carried small cannons.

In 2021, archaeological excavations are taking place on the island of Niiwalarra (Sir Graham Moore Island), off the Kimberley coast, for the first time since Ian Crawford did his research in the 1960s. The archaeologists are being assisted by some of the traditional owners of the island, the Kwini people. Evidence of pottery and other artefacts from the new excavations are being complemented by the oral histories of the Kwini people, yielding evidence of Makassan fishers and traders on the island. A number of hearths are a record of where the trepang was cooked on the beach in large iron pots, with activity especially picking up around 1800.

=== Indonesia ===
There are written and oral accounts of Aboriginal people moving to the island with Asian fishermen, some dating back as far as the 1600s. In early 2023, photographs featuring Aboriginal Australian people which had been taken in Makassar in the 1870s were discovered. Yolngu elders identified the subjects of the photos as Yolngu people from the Arnhem Land area. The discovery sparked an international search for descendants of these people, in the hope of being able to do DNA testing to shed more light on migration from northern Australia to South East Asia.

== Effect on Indigenous people of Australia ==
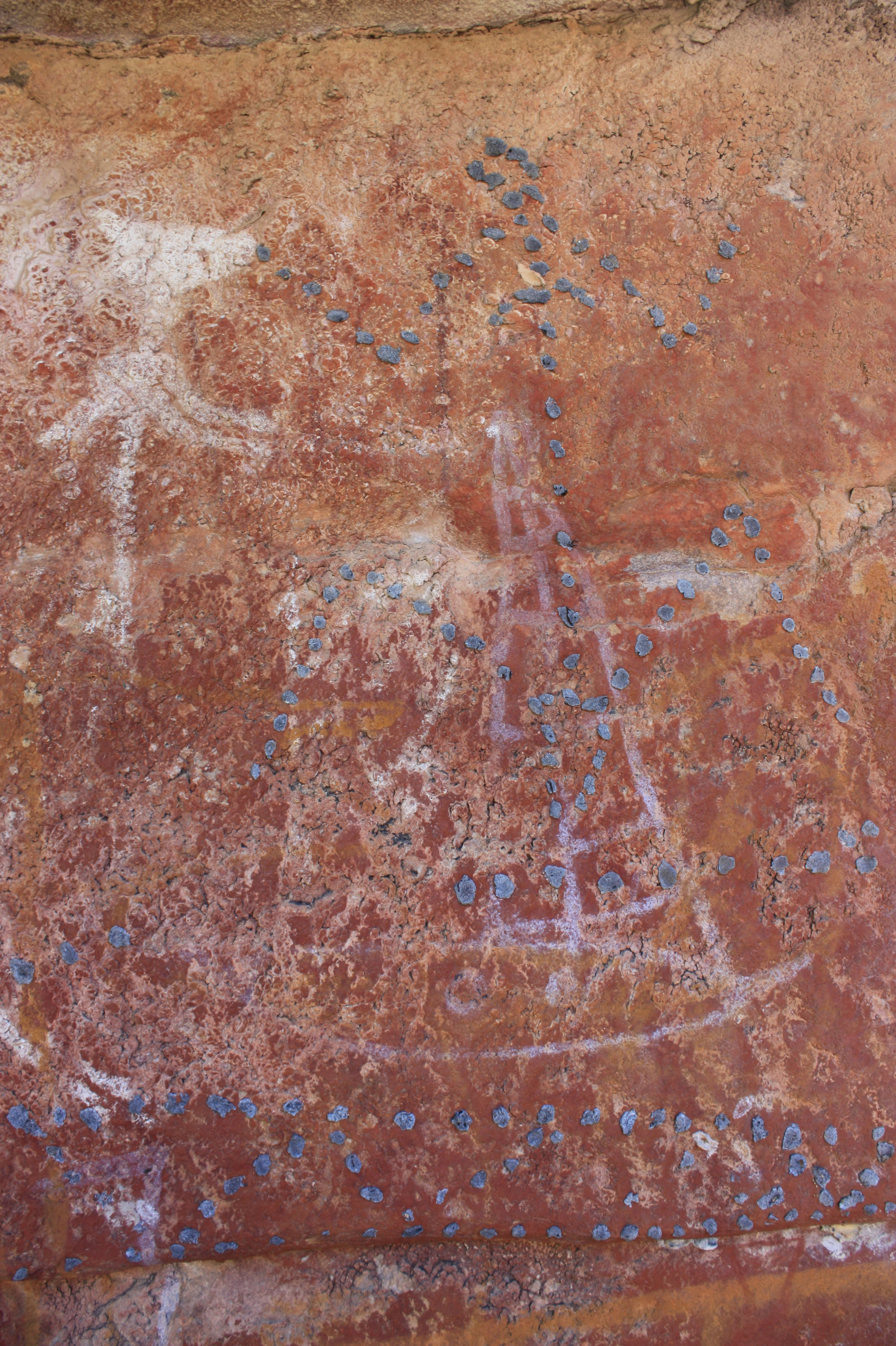
A female figure outlined in beeswax over painting of a white Makassan prau

The Makassar contact with Aboriginal people had a significant effect on the latter's culture, and likely there were also cross-cultural influences. Ganter writes "the cultural imprint on the Yolngu people of this contact is everywhere: in their language, in their art, in their stories, in their cuisine". According to anthropologist John Bradley from Monash University, the contact between the two groups was a success: "They traded together. It was fair – there was no racial judgement, no race policy". Even into the early 21st century, the shared history between the two peoples is still celebrated by Aboriginal communities in northern Australia as a period of mutual trust and respect.

However, anthropologist Ian McIntosh has speculated that the initial effects of contact with the Makassan fishermen resulted in "turmoil" with the extent of Islamic influence being noteworthy. In another paper McIntosh says, "strife, poverty and domination ... is a previously unrecorded legacy of contact between Aborigines and Indonesians". He also claims that the Makassan appear to have been welcomed initially; however, relations deteriorated when, "aborigines began to feel they were being exploited ... leading to violence on both sides".

=== Trade and migration ===
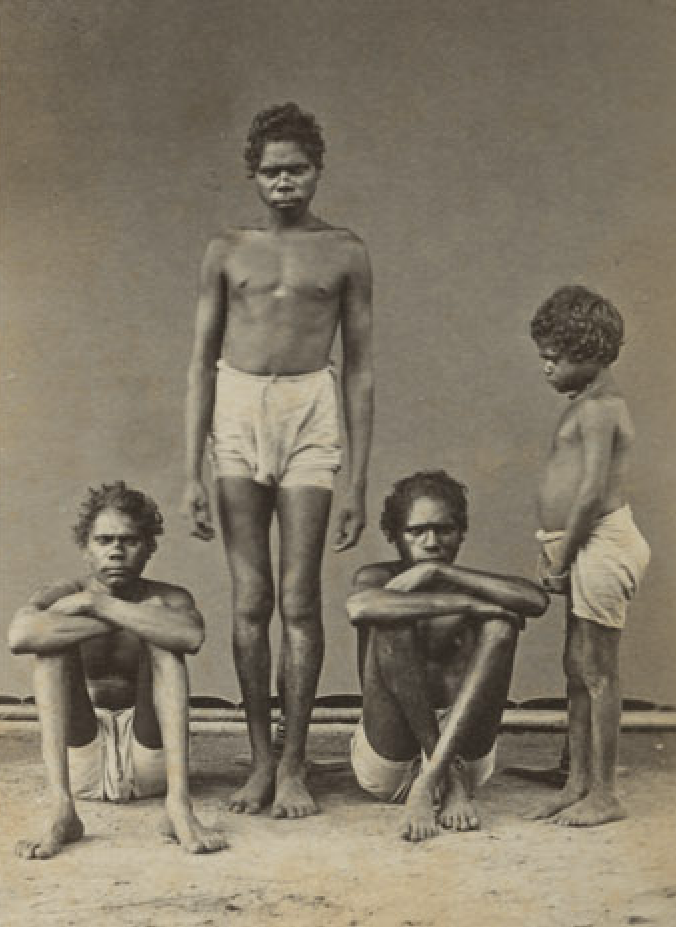
A group of Aboriginal Australians in Makassar, 1873.

Studies by anthropologists have found traditions that indicate the Makassans negotiated with local people on the Australian continent for the right to fish certain waters. The exchange also involved the trade of cloth, tobacco, metal axes and knives, rice, and gin. The Yolngu of Arnhem Land also traded turtle-shell, pearls and cypress pine, and some were employed as trepangers. While there is ample evidence of peaceful contact, some contact was hostile. Using Daeng Rangka described at least one violent confrontation with Aboriginal people, while Flinders recorded being advised by the Makassan to "beware of the natives".

Some of the rock art and bark paintings appear to confirm that some Aboriginal workers willingly accompanied the Makassans back to their homeland of South Sulawesi across the Arafura Sea. Women were also occasional items of exchange according to Denise Russell, but their views and experiences have not been recorded. Italian botanist Odoardo Beccari, during a stay in Makassar in 1873, took photographs of Aboriginal Australians in the city. Beccari remarked that Aboriginal Australians were "not uncommon" in Makassar. A 1895 account noted an Aboriginal man in Blue Mud Bay with some knowledge of English who claimed to have travelled with the Makassans to Singapore. After visiting Groote Eylandt in the early 1930s, anthropologist Donald Thomson speculated that the traditional seclusion of women from strange men and their use of portable bark screens in this region "may have been a result of contact with Macassans".

=== Health ===
Smallpox may have been introduced to northern Australia in the 1820s via Makassan contact. This remains unproven as First Fleet smallpox was already recorded as spreading across Australia from Sydney Cove. The prevalence of the hereditary Machado–Joseph disease in the Groote Eylandt community has been attributed to outside contact. Recent genetic studies showed that the Groote Eylandt families with MJD shared a Y-DNA haplogroup with some families of Taiwanese, Indian, and Japanese ancestry.

=== Economic ===
Some Yolngu communities of Arnhem Land appear to have transitioned their economies from being largely land-based to largely sea-based, following the introduction of Makassar technologies such as dug-out canoes, which were highly prized. These seaworthy boats, unlike the traditional Yolngu bark canoes, allowed the people to fish the ocean for dugongs and sea turtles. Macknight notes that both the dug-out canoe and shovel-nosed spear found in Arnhem Land were based on Macassarese prototypes. Yolngu communities also learned ironworking techniques from the Makassarese, which allowed for the manufacture of the canoes and spears.

=== Language ===
A Makassan pidgin became a lingua franca along the north coast, not just between Makassan and Aboriginal people, but also as a language of trade among different Aboriginal groups, who were brought into greater contact with each other by the seafaring Makassar culture. Words from the Makassarese language (related to Javanese and Malay) can still be found in Aboriginal language varieties of the north coast. Examples include rupiah (money), jama (work), and balanda (white person). The latter was adopted into the Makassar language via the Malay term orang belanda (referring to Dutch person).

In 2012, a huge painting by Gulumbu Yunupingu titled Garrurru (Sail) was installed at the Australian National University's Hedley Bull Centre for World Politics. The word garrurru is the Yolngu word for "sail", and derives from the Makassan word for sailcloth.

=== Religion ===
Drawing on the work of Ian Mcintosh (2000), Regina Ganter and Peta Stephenson suggest that aspects of Islam were creatively adapted by the Yolngu. Muslim references still survive in certain ceremonies and Dreaming stories in the early 21st century. Stephenson speculates that the Makassans may have been the first visitors to bring Islam to Australia.

According to anthropologist John Bradley from Monash University, "If you go to north-east Arnhem Land there is [a trace of Islam] in song, it is there in painting, it is there in dance, it is there in funeral rituals. It is patently obvious that there are borrowed items. With linguistic analysis as well, you're hearing hymns to Allah, or at least certain prayers to Allah". (Note: "... a figure called Walitha'walitha, which is worshipped by a clan of the Yolngu people on Elcho Island, off the northern coast of Arnhem Land. The name derives from the Arabic phrase 'Allah ta'ala', meaning 'God, the exalted'. Walitha'walitha is closely associated with funeral rituals, which can include other Islamic elements like facing west during prayers – roughly the direction of Mecca – and ritual prostration reminiscent of the Muslim sujood. 'I think it would be hugely oversimplifying to suggest that this figure is Allah as the "one true God",' says Howard Morphy, an anthropologist at Australian National University. It's more the case of the Yolngu people adopting an Allah-like figure into their cosmology, he suggests.")

== End of contact ==
Makassan activities in the Northern Territory began to decline in the late nineteenth century, as a result of the annexation of the region by South Australia. The South Australian government began to impose a fishing license tax on the Makassan fishermen by the 1880s, resulting in a reduction of their number as the profitability declined. This arrangement initially survived following the 1901 Federation of Australia. However, following a massacre of a Makassan crew at Cape Wilberforce in May 1902, a diplomatic spat occurred between the new Australian Federal Government and the Dutch East Indies government in Batavia. A compensation was paid to the Batavia government, but calls began to emerge to shut the industry down citing negative impacts to the Aboriginal population and competition with potential white Australian ventures. Eventually, the South Australian government opted to stop issuing licenses in July 1906, and the last Makassan fishermen came in November 1906, returning in 1907.

== Current situation ==
Though prevented from fishing across Arnhem Land, other Indonesian fishermen have continued to fish up and down the west coast, in what are now Australian waters. This continues a practice of several hundred years, before such territories were declared – and some use traditional boats their grandparents owned. The current Australian government considers such fishing illegal by its rules. Since the 1970s, if the fishermen are caught by authorities, their boats are burned and the fishermen are deported to Indonesia. Most Indonesian fishing in Australian waters now occurs around what Australia termed "Ashmore Reef" (known in Indonesia as Pulau Pasir) and the nearby islands.

The last Makassan known to have made contact with Australia, Mangnellai Daeng Maro, died in 1978.

Makassan contact history has been promoted by Yolngu communities as a source of cultural pride, and by Australian Muslims to demonstrate a long-term history of presence in the country. In 1988, the prau Hati Marege ("Heart of Marege") made a voyage from Makassar to Arnhem Land coinciding with the Australian Bicentenary, captained by Using Daeng Rangka's great-grandson and received in Elcho Island by the local Galiwin'ku community. Following the voyage, a series of mutual visits occurred between Makassar and Arnhem Land's Aboriginal communities, with a number of artistic performances in the ensuing years.

Relations with Makassans were cited as part of a native title claim to exclusive sea rights surrounding Croker Island, and the High Court of Australia partially granted the claimants' requests, providing the communities with non-exclusive sea rights in 2001. The judgment relied on disputed historical findings that Aboriginal communities had not refused entry by Makassans into the waters. A minority dissenting opinion by Justice Michael Kirby noted that the judgment had posited an obligation to "the poorly armed forebears" and "would always be unfavourable" to the communities.

== See also ==
- Patorani and padewakang, two types of perahu used for trepanging by Makassan
- History of Australia before 1901
- Theory of Portuguese discovery of Australia
- Baijini, a legendary people interpreted by some researchers as pre-Makassan visitors to Arnhem Land.
- Marchinbar Island, location of a deposit of early coins in Australia
- Javanese contact with Australia
