= Using Daeng Rangka =

Makassan trepanger working in Australia

Daeng Husein Daeng Rangka
- Born: c. 1845
- Died: 1927 (aged 81–82)

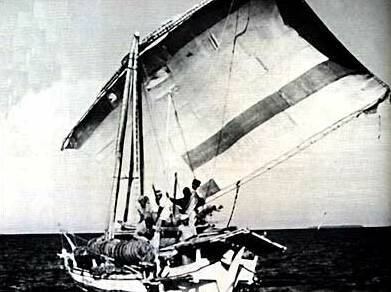
A Macassan wooden sailboat or prau of the type trepangers have used for centuries

Using Daeng Rangka, also known as Husein Daeng Rangka (c. 1845–1927) was a Makassan fisherman and ship's captain, one of many trepangers who had early contact with Aboriginal Australians in northern Australia, and said to be the last to visit Australia in 1907. He had children with at least one Yolngu woman and has descendants in both Indonesia and Australia.

== Early life ==
Using Daeng Rangka was born around 1845 in Labbakang, in the south Celebes (Sulawesi), His father was Bugis and his mother Macassarese. He first travelled to Australia on a trepanging boat when he was a child.

His name is often recorded as Husein Daeng Rangka, as the name Husein has Arabic roots and becomes Using when translated into the Makassarese language. "Daeng" is derived from an honorific title of Gowa.

== Trepanging career ==
Fishermen from the Indonesian islands travelled across to the Australian continent to harvest trepang, a type of sea cucumber, from at least the 18th century. In December 1883, Rangka acquired one of the first trepanging licences issued by the South Australian Government, for his prau, Bondeng Patola. His published accounts and memoirs formed the basis for great study in the history of Australia–Indonesia relations.

Using suffered several setbacks during his career. His ship was wrecked on Melville Island in 1886, and he fought off Aboriginal Australian attacks with a rifle until rescued. He was wrecked once more in 1895, and forced to undertake a 644-kilometre (400 mi) journey in a canoe. Working in a time of great decline in Makassan trepanging in Australasia, Using was sent by a fellow entrepreneur to sound out the Australian government on their new laws restricting the trade to Australian businesses in the 1890s.

== Family ==
There is one story that he abducted the wife of a local Aboriginal leader during his time at Melville Bay, and that he is believed to have had two Aboriginal wives.

Using's married first a Macassarese woman called Basse'; they had no children. He then married another Maccassarese woman, Daeng Tanang, with whom he had 11 children. One of his sons, Mangngellai Daeng Maro, travelled with his father to Australia on his last two trips.

He also had two Aboriginal wives. He had children with a Yolngu woman in eastern Arnhem Land, two daughters and either one or two sons. A great-grandson, Kaharuddin Lewa, known as Pak Kahar, reported that he respected and liked Aboriginal people, and wanted to share his Islamic religion with them.

== Later life and death ==
The Australian authorities shut down the trepang trade in 1907, as British settlement spread across the top of the continent, and in this year, Rangka made his final voyage to the continent. He made one last journey to the Lesser Sunda Islands before retiring to Kampong Maloku.

He died at Kampong Maloku in 1927.
