= Pobasso =

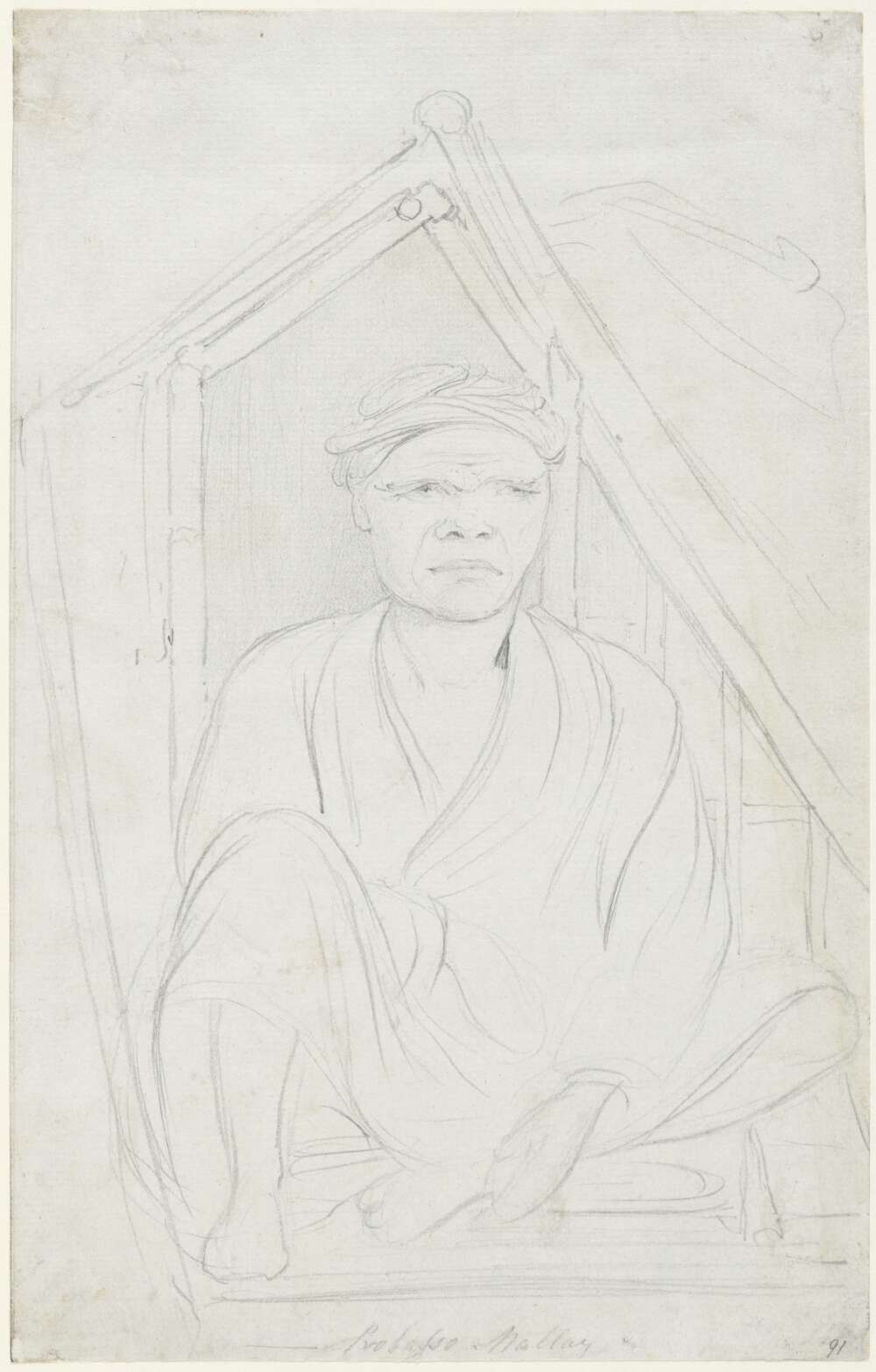
A drawing of Probasso by William Westall onboard Matthew Flinders' ship the Investigator

Pobasso, also spelt Probasso or Pobassoo, was the chief of a division of the Makassan fleet of perahu in the waters between northern Australia and Indonesia in the late 1700s and early 1800s. The fleet harvested trepang, or sea cucumber, trading it to China. Pobasso was a key informant on the early Makassan relationships with Australia's Indigenous peoples prior to European settlement.

== Contact with Flinders ==
On his 1803 voyage mapping the coastline of Terra Australis, Captain Matthew Flinders came upon six perahu vessels on the 17 February at the English Company's Islands' Malay Road, north of Arnhem Land. Thinking they were Chinese pirates he approached with caution. Pobasso, who Flinders described as a "short, elderly man" and five other chiefs came aboard Flinders's ship the Investigator where he was extensively questioned by Flinders about the trepang trade. He was able to communicate through his cook, Abraham Williams, who acted as interpreter. Williams was of Javanese background, though generally described as a Malay by the British. It is most likely that Flinders took Williams on board in Cape Town, South Africa a port which Flinders visited on his way to Australia and where many Malays had been transported by the Dutch.

Pobasso educated Flinders about their fleet. He said its commander-in-chief was a man named 'Salloo' and was owned by the 'Rajah of Boni'. It boasted separate divisions totaling 60 perahu and 1000 crew. Each perahu was 25 tons with a crew of 20 to 25 men. He said that he had made at least six voyages to the Australian coast over 20 years and was the first to do so. They had no knowledge of any European settlement in Australia and upon Flinders telling him about Port Jackson, Pobasso's son took notes about the settlement in "foreign characters, writing from left to right". He also claimed to never have seen another foreign ship in the waters of the northern Australian coastline.

Pobasso's fleet had no charts nor were they able to make astronomical observations. They had no navigational tools other than a small compass. They carried a month's water supply in joints of bamboo as well as dried fish, coconuts, rice and poultry. Flinders noted that Pobasso carried two small brass guns, obtained from the Dutch. The other chiefs were also armed, each carrying "a short dagger or cress".

Pobasso warned that his fleet "sometimes had skirmishes with the native inhabitants of the coast". He had formerly been speared in the knee, cautioning Flinders, ‘beware of the natives’.

He was sketched by artist William Westall who was aboard the Investigator.

Pobasso delayed his journey by a day to spend time with Flinders, accepting gifts of iron tools and a letter written in English to show to any other ships he might meet on his travels.

Flinders named an island after Pobasso, Pobassoo Island.

== References in popular culture ==
A fictional representation of Pobasso features in Steven Marcuson's novel The Bunting Quest. Pobasso is also a central character in the musical Pobasso and the Cucumbers by Chris James, primarily performed for high schools.
