= Thomas Worsnop =

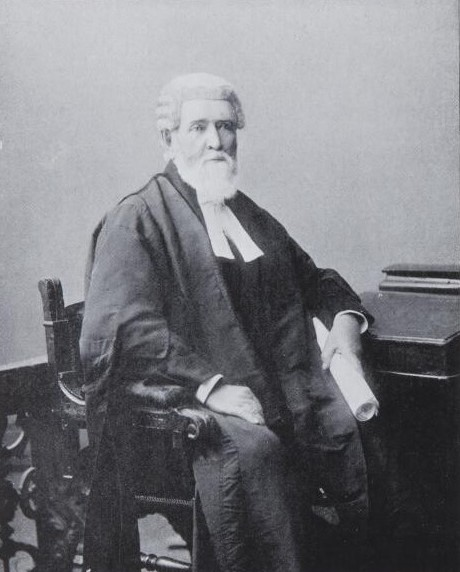

Thomas Worsnop (2 February 1821 – 24 January 1898) was an Australian colonial militia, historian, local government official and town clerk. Worsnop was born in Wortley, Yorkshire, England and died in North Adelaide, South Australia.

Thomas Worsnop died on 24 January 1898 at his home in Barnard Street, North Adelaide.

Worsnop arrived in South Australia on 12 November 1852. He first settled at Port Elliot with his family and worked as a storeman, for seven years, for Elder, Stirling and Company. In 1859 he was appointed a sergeant in the South Australian Volunteers. For a time he worked on the land but not with great success. Then he tried work as a publican and in 1863 he was lessee of the Globe Inn in Rundle Street, but he was declared bankrupt in 1864. Next, Worsnop took up the drudgery of work as a teamster in the north. Finally, in September 1866 he became a clerk in the Town Clerk's department in Adelaide and on 11 January 1869 was appointed acting town clerk taking over permanently later that year.

Somewhat surprisingly, given his previous failures, Worsnop proved to be a good administrator and he was able to reduce the debt of the City Council. He was also most concerned with protecting the parklands and fascinated by the history of city and colony. In 1878 he wrote the detailed History of the City of Adelaide and later had published several papers on Aboriginal artefacts and weapons.

He is commemorated with the naming in his honour of Mount Worsnop in the Gibson Desert of Western Australia by Sir John Forrest on 15 July 1874.

== See also ==
- Sir Thomas Elder
- Sir Edward Charles Stirling
