= Patorani =

Traditional fishing boat in Indonesia

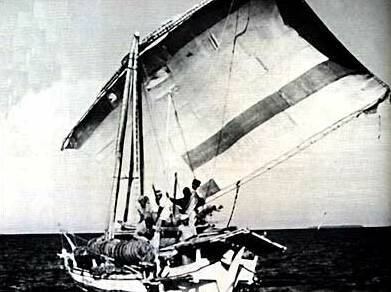
Prau used by Makassan for trepanging

Patorani (Makassarese: ᨄᨕᨈᨚᨑᨕᨊᨗ; also prauw patorani or perahu patorani) is a traditional fishing boat from Makassar, Indonesia. It is used by Macassan people for fishing, transport, and trading since at least 17th century AD. Historically this type of boat was used by Gowa Sultanate as war boat.

== Etymology ==
The name ᨈᨚᨑᨕᨊᨗ torani means flying fish (Exocoetidae). Patorani thus can be translated as "flying fish catcher".

== Description ==
Patorani fishing boat has pajala type hull with Makassar-styled rudder mounting and tripod mast. The second tripod mast is supported by the roof of its deckhouse. This boat carried wood poles as a material for fishing and basket-shaped fish traps. The sail is usually canted rectangular sail or lateen sail. Some of them had bowsprit, adorned with pieces of wool, pendants, wooden fish carving, and other decorations. If the bowsprit is not present, they are placed in the curved stempost.

Patorani design remains largely unchanged for several hundred years, but sometimes in the end of the 19th century, boat builders adopted frames and decking of European origins. Some of the frames reached above gun mount, and the tripod is used as pivot for 3 vertical stake that were connected to the flooring.

== See also ==
- Trepanging, act of collecting sea cucumber
- Makassan contact with Australia
- Mayang (boat)
- Jukung
- Sandeq
- Padewakang
- Pencalang
- Pinisi
