= Trepanging =

Collecting or harvesting sea cucumbers

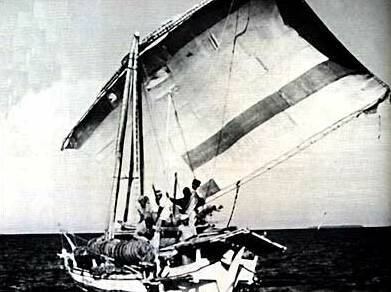
A Makassarese wooden sailboat or prau of the type trepangers have used for centuries

Trepanging is the act of collecting or harvesting sea cucumbers (Indonesian: trepang, Malay: těripang) that are used as food.

The collector, or fisher, of trepang is a trepanger.

Trepanging is comparable to clamming, crabbing, lobstering, musseling, shrimping and other forms of "fishing" whose goal is the acquisition of edible invertebrates rather than fish.

== History ==
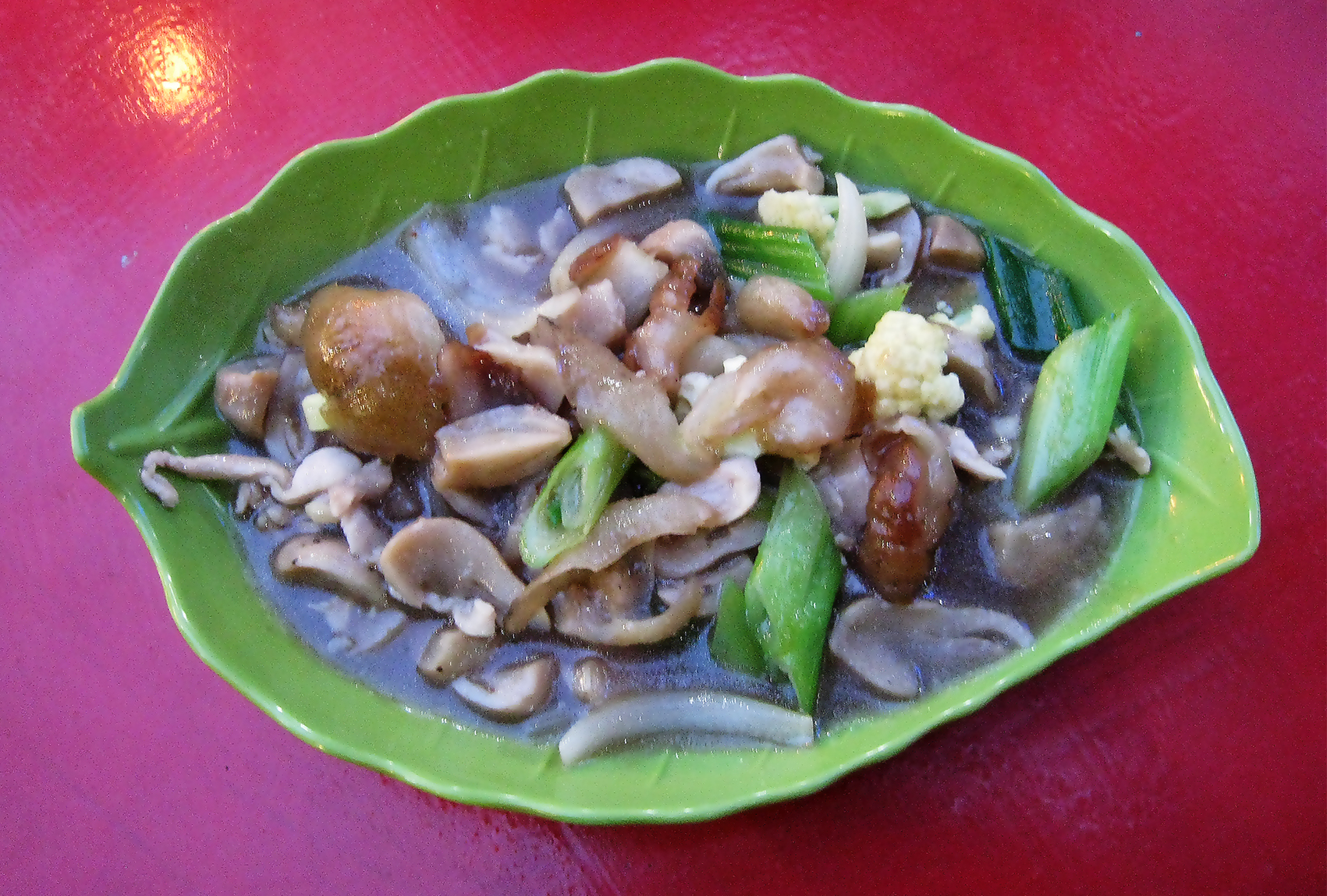
Haisom cah jamur, Chinese Indonesian sea cucumber with mushroom

To supply the markets of Southern China, Makassarese trepangers traded with the Aboriginal Australians of Arnhem Land from at least the 18th century and likely considerably earlier. This Makassan contact with Australia is the first recorded example of interaction between the inhabitants of the Australian continent and their Asian neighbours.

This contact had a major impact on the Indigenous Australians. The Makassarese exchanged goods such as cloth, tobacco, knives, rice and alcohol for the right to trepang coastal waters and employ local labour. Makassar pidgin became a lingua franca along the north coast among different Indigenous Australian groups who were brought into greater contact with each other by the seafaring Makassan culture.

Archeological remains of Makassan contact, including trepang processing plants from the 18th and 19th centuries, are still found at Australian locations such as Port Essington and Groote Eylandt, and the Makassar-planted tamarind trees (native to Madagascar and East Africa).

== Methods ==
Slow-moving creatures related to sea stars and sea urchins, sea cucumbers are found on the sea floor. As such, trepanging is accomplished by spearing, diving, dredging or simply picking the animals up by hand when they are exposed at low tide.

Traditionally, sea cucumbers were placed in boiling water before being dried and smoked before going to market.

== Commerce ==
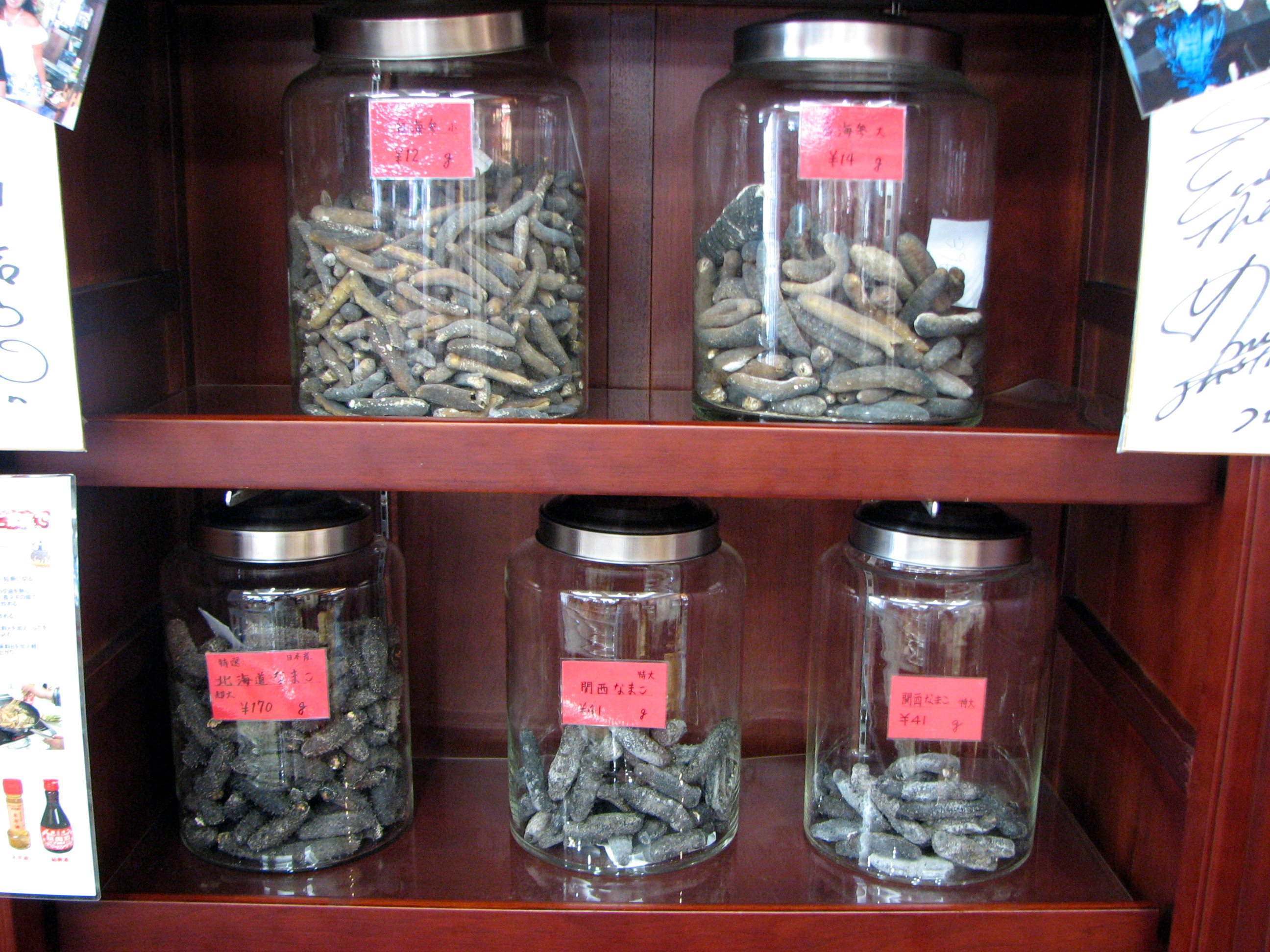
Dried sea cucumber in a traditional Chinese medicine emporium in Yokohama, Japan

Trepanging is an economically important activity in some areas, particularly Southeast Asia. Sea cucumber is considered a delicacy in Far Eastern countries such as China, Indonesia, Japan, and Malaysia.

Besides being valued for flavour-enhancing properties, sea cucumber is widely regarded as a stimulant and aphrodisiac. There is evidence that its reputed medicinal properties may be true.

Based upon the belief in the healing properties of sea cucumber, pharmaceutical and cosmetics companies have developed pills, oils, and creams based on extracts. The effectiveness of sea cucumber extract in tissue repair has been the subject of scientific study.

== Art ==
Although some historians dates the start of the trepang industry to 1720, Regina Ganter of Griffith University suggests that the start of the industry may be around 1640. Artistic evidence, like the Arnhem land rock, also suggests that contact may go as far back as the 1500s.

The land rock depicts the extensive boat voyages that spanned thousands of miles around the Australian cost line. The north-west monsoon, which arrived each December, also dictated the semi-permanent locations where the Makassan people would settle. These images likely contribute to narrative stories, which are associated with the ancestral story telling tradition of the indigenous people of Arnhem Land.

Artist Nandabitta Maminyamandja (1911 - 1981) of the Anindilyakwa people painted Macassan prau and trepang curing in 1974. This work is natural pigments on eucalyptus bark and is now on display in the National Gallery of Australia. The subject matter includes the communication that the trepanging industry fostered, most importantly early trade interactions. In 1883, the trepanging trade started to decline with the South Australian governments implementation of the trepanging license.

Trepanging-related art work was consistent with the influx of missionaries into the area, as there was a greater demand for secular stories. The missionaries did not encourage the production of ceremonial stories, and they established clear regulations around the subject matter that was depicted and distributed. Therefore, the narrative elements of the Makassan people harvesting sea cucumbers, engaging in the production process, and starting to trade, was culturally educational and desirable for the art market.

== See also ==
- Carronade Island
- Gamat
- Makassan contact with Australia
- MOU Box
- Padewakang, a type of perahu used by trepangers
- Patorani, another type of perahu used by trepangers
- Pobasso
- Sama-Bajau peoples
