= Padewakang =

Traditional Indonesian sailing vessel

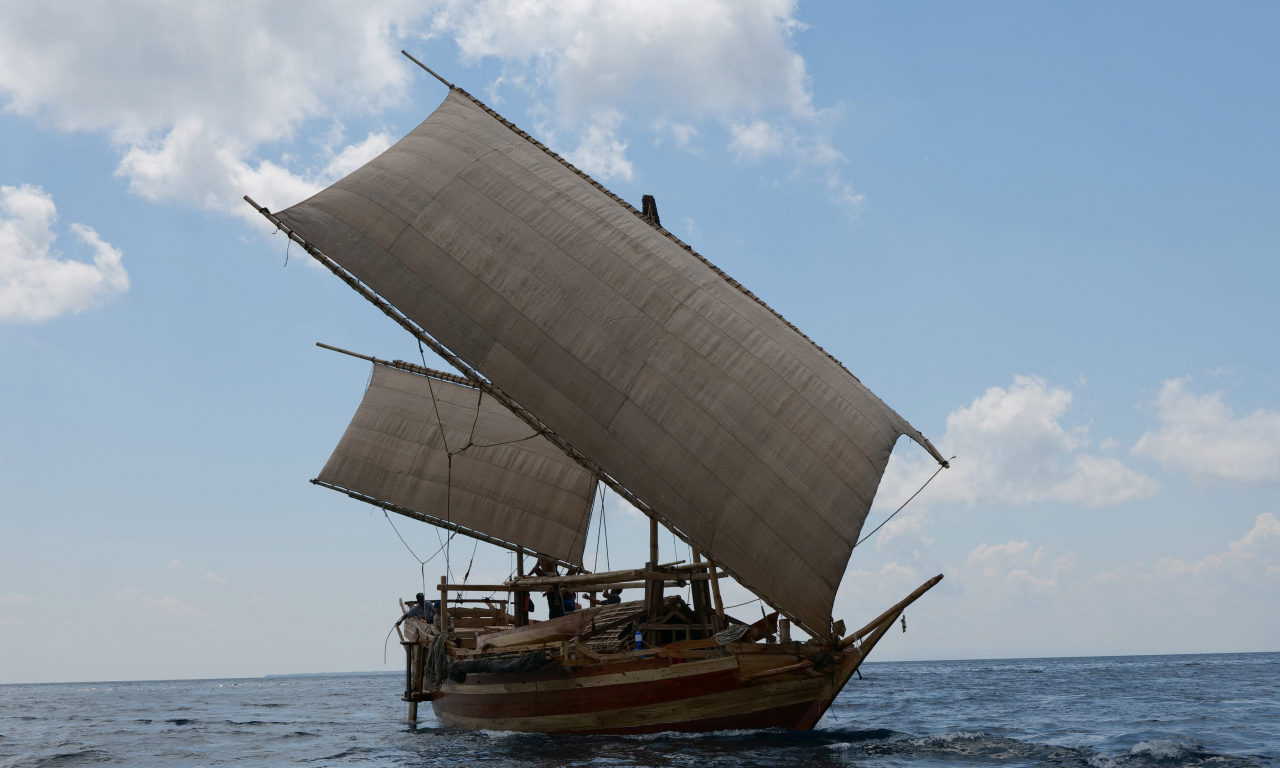
The Nur Al Marege, a modern replica of a padewakang, sailed from Makassar to the north coast of Australia in 2019.

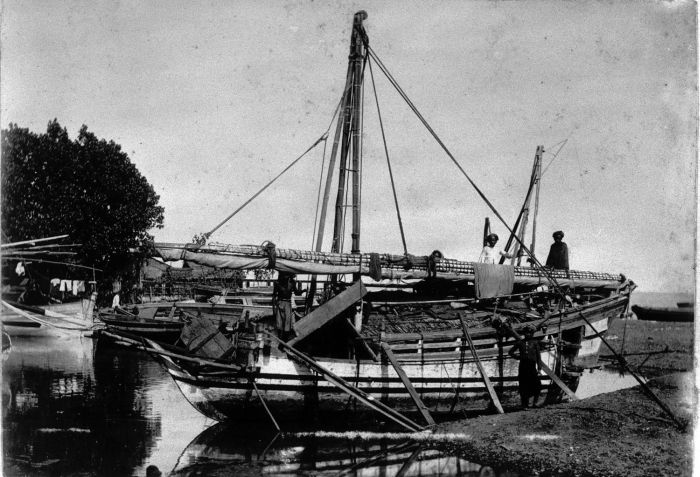
A two-masted padewakang, c. 1880–1890.

Padewakangs were traditional boats used by the Bugis, Mandar, and Makassar people of South Sulawesi. Padewakangs were used for long-distance voyages serving the south Sulawesi kingdoms.

== Etymology ==
The origin of the name is unknown, though some have suggested that it stems from Dewakang Island, an important navigational landmark between Sulawesi and Java. Dutch records from the 1735 mention letters from Sulawesi arriving in Batavia 'per praauw Paduackang'.

According to Horridge, the words padewakang, paduwakang (Sulawesi) and paduwang (Madura) have its roots from word wa, wangka, waga, wangga, and bangka of Austronesian languages. The term is associated with outrigger perahu or small perahu.

== Description ==
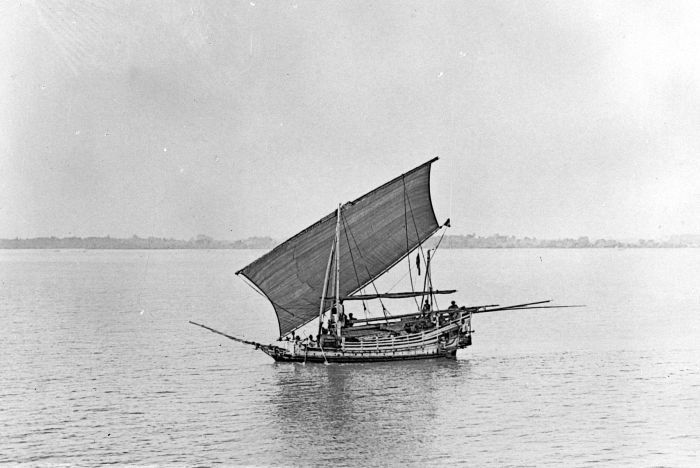
A padewakang at Makassar, date unknown.

It typically weights between 20 and 50 tons, had one or two tripod masts with "lateen" (tanja) sails made of mat. Like other traditional vessels of the archipelago, it is steered using two quarter rudders. Between the end of the 16th century to early 20th century they routinely sailed for the coasts of northern Australia in search of teripang (sea cucumbers), armed with cannon of ancient origin, probably cetbang or lantaka. Padewakang were the biggest craft of South Sulawesi as trading vessel and as war fleets, used for hundreds of years sailing the seas between western New Guinea, the southern parts of the Philippines, and the Malay Peninsula. There is even a British publication of padewakang under full sail in the Persian Gulf. They are used until the production stopped in favor of the famous Palari by the 20th century. The palari evolved from basic padewakang hull with fore-and-aft sails to its own hull model with indigenous "pinisi rig". H. Warington Smyth described a large 2-masted padewakang built of giam wood. The dimension is as follows: 99 ft (30.2 m) long, 15 ft (4.6 m) wide, 12 ft (3.7 m) depth, 6 ft 3 inch (1.91 m) freeboard. The capacity was 60 koyan (145 metric tons), with 60 ft (18.3 m) mainmast, crewed by 16 men.

== Evolution to palari-pinisi ==
According to Horst Liebner, a Mandar maritime expert, pinisi sail originally mounted onto the hull of a padewakang and similar boats; however, when the sailors and craftsmen are increasingly aware of the way they are used, they selected only the palari (derived from lari—"to run") hull — a very pointed hull type and it is indeed the one that best suits the schooner sail.

This evolution takes place in several stages: The hull type is designed with more pointed and enhanced with some additional boards that causing the deck of the bow becomes lower than the main deck and the stern, and that the construction of the rolling beams seems to 'fly' behind stern boat (Konjo language: palari salompong ambeng rua kali); the next part of the stern deck (ambeng) is continued until the steering beams merge with it (palari salompong); and the last step is to increase the bow height so that the entire deck becomes straight.

This last type of hull is used until the pinisi boat is replaced with PLM (motorized sailboat) type. In the early 1970s thousands of pinisi-palari ships measuring up to 200 tonnes of cargo, the world's largest commercial sailing fleet at the time, had contacted all corners of the Indonesian seas and became the trading backbone of the people.

== Replica ==
- One replica named "Hati Marege" (Heart of Arnhem Land) is exhibited in Northern Territory Museum of Arts & Gallery. It is a replica of padewakang used in search of Australian sea cucumber before 1906–1907 Australian ban on Makassan trepangers.
- A replica is exhibited at Les Royaumes de la mer (Kingdoms of the Sea) in La Boverie, Liège, Belgium.
- A replica named "Nur Al Marege" (the name comes from Arabic Nur Al- means "light of" + Marege, "land of the black people, i.e Australia") was sailed to Australia between December 2019–January 2020. It was 14.5 m long, 4.2 m wide, and 2 m high and made from bitti wood. The boat was ordered by Abu Hanifa Institute of Sydney, for use in a documentary film.

== Gallery ==
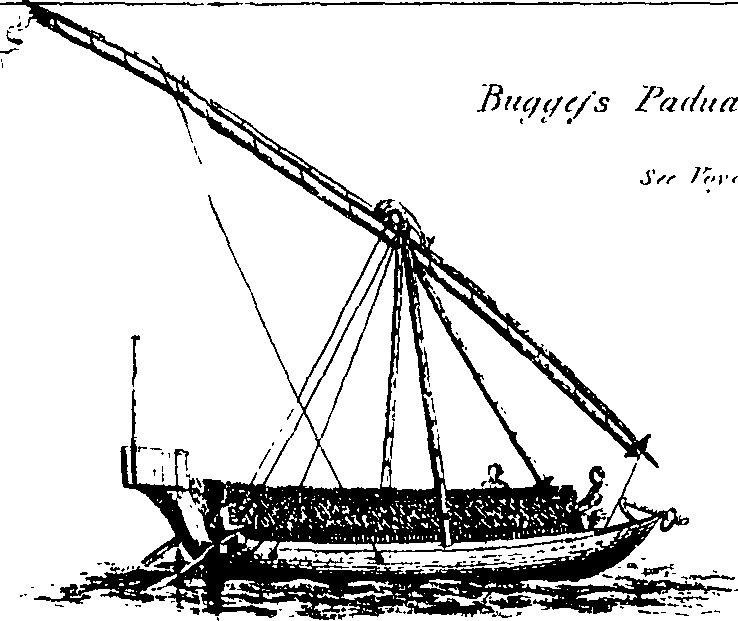
1792 English engraving of Bugis "padua" (padewakang)

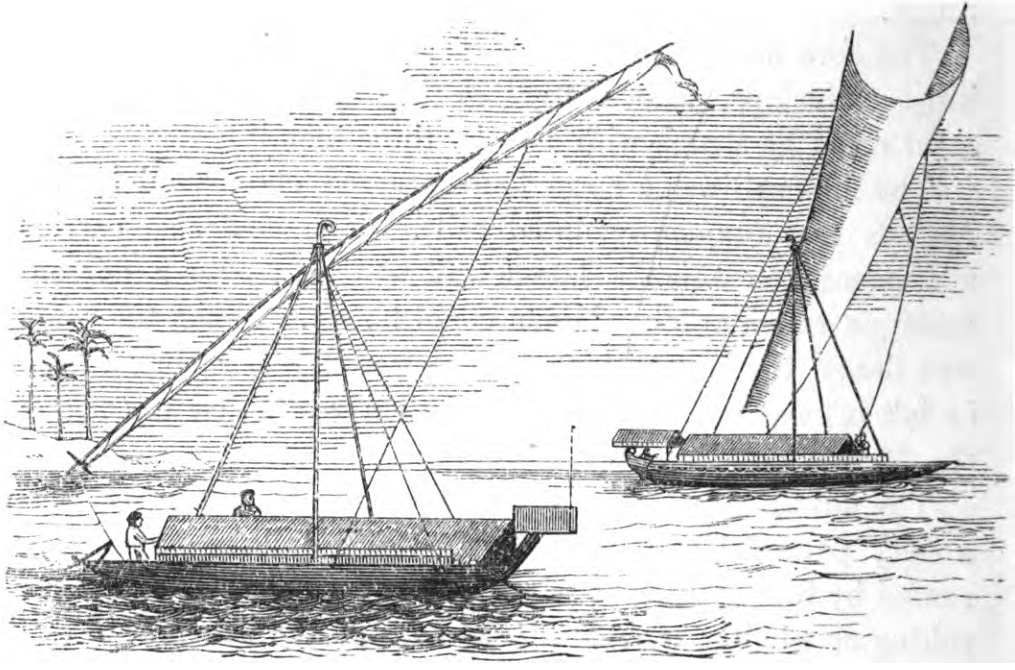
Paduakan (padewakang) of Celebes, 1863

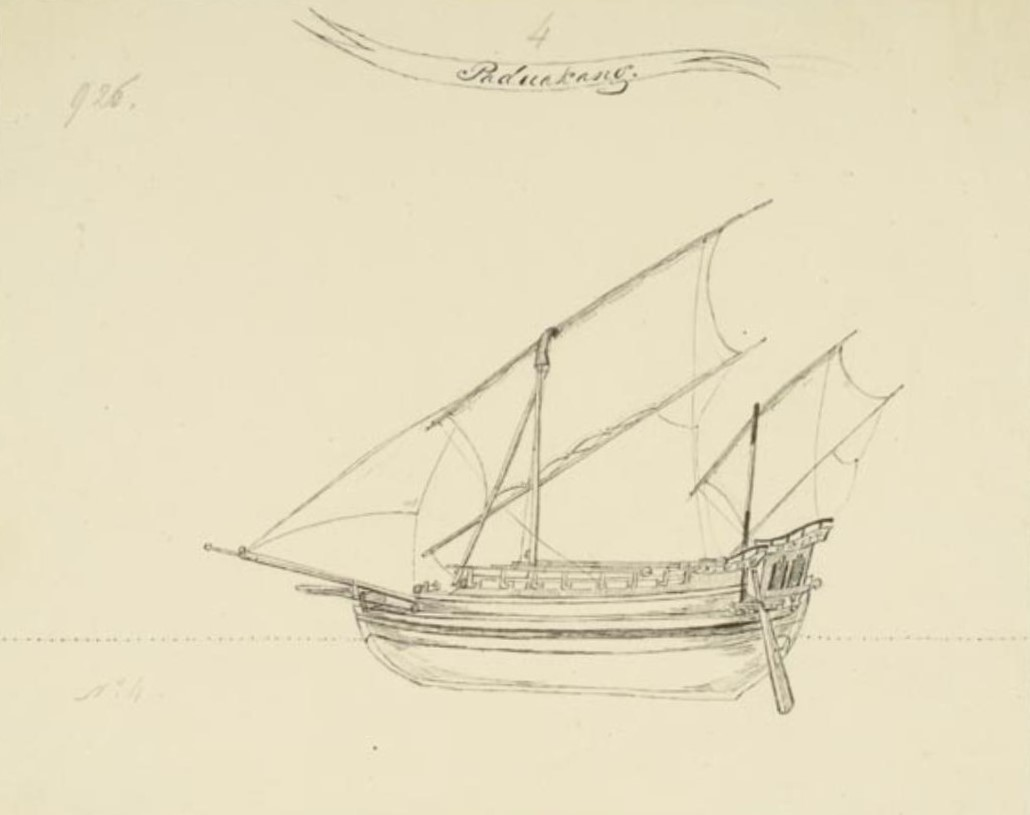
A drawing of paduakang, c. 1821–1828.

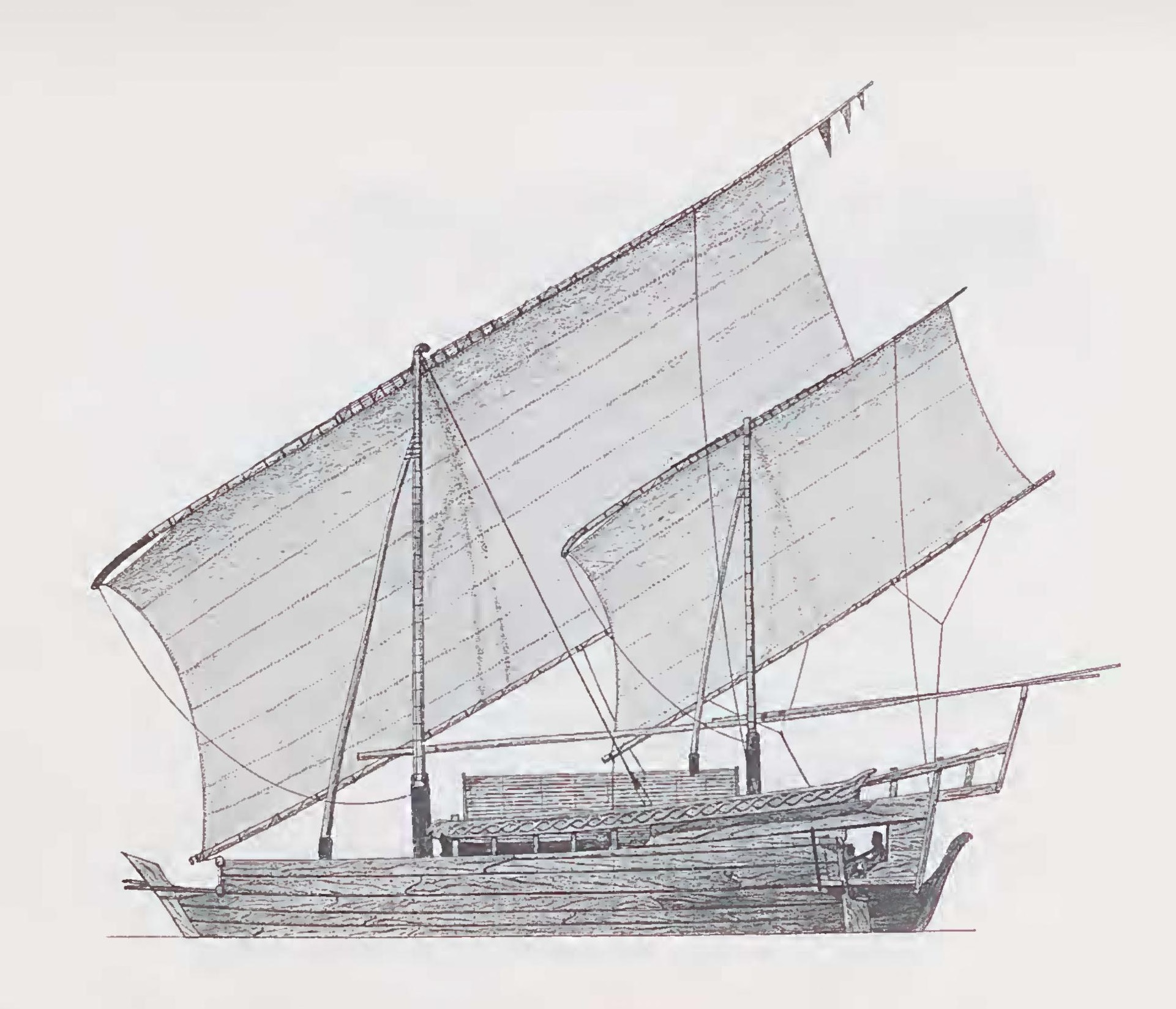
Padewakang reconstruction by Nick Burningham (1987).

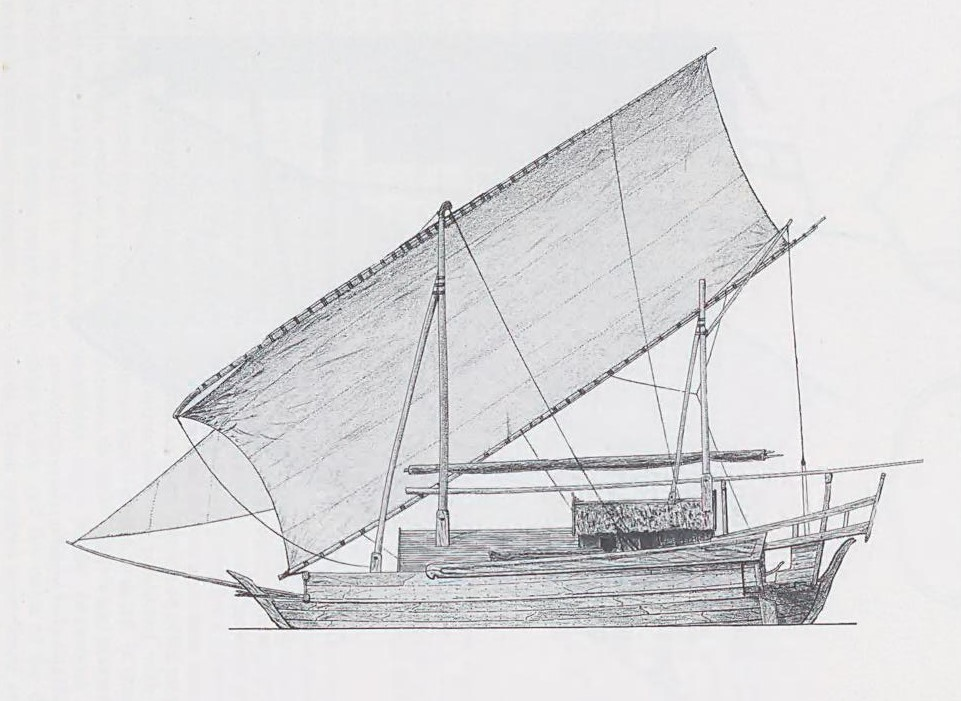
Burningham's reconstruction of padewakang with bowsprit and headsail.

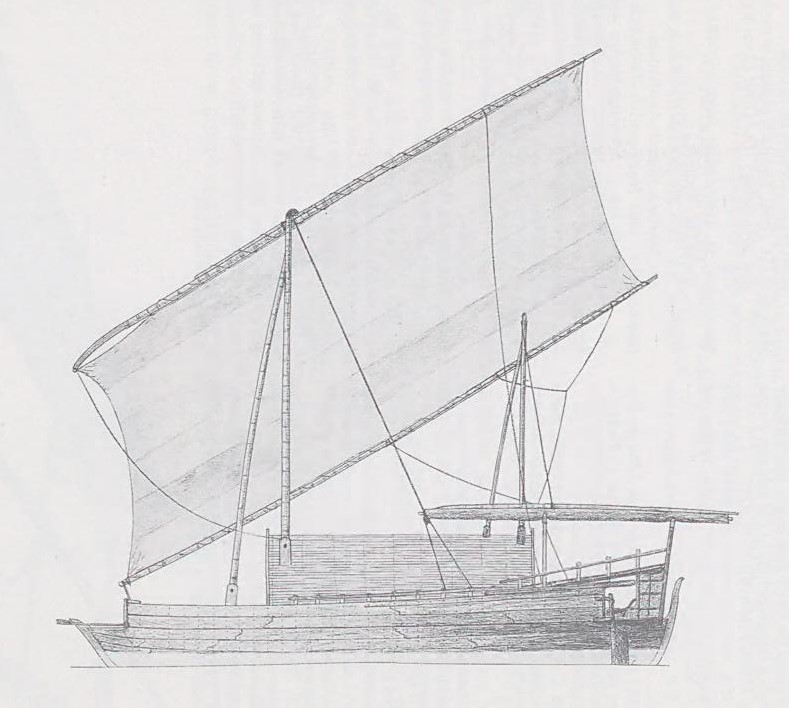
Burningham's reconstruction of padewakang with larger deckhouse and furled sail.

== See also ==
- Makassan contact with Australia
- Trepanging, act of collection and harvesting sea cucumber (teripang)
- Kora-kora
- Kakap (boat)
- Penjajap
- Pinisi
