= Jukung =

Indonesian traditional fishing boat

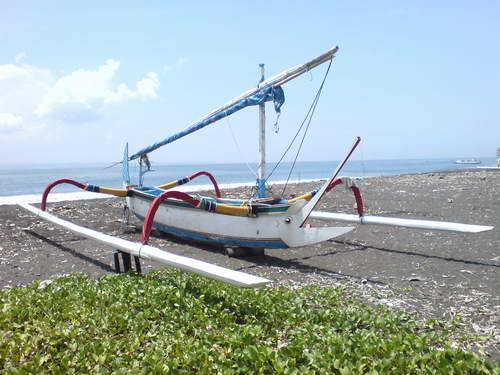
A Balinese jukung at rest

A jukung is a small wooden Indonesian outrigger canoe. It is a traditional fishing boat, but newer uses include "Jukung Dives", using the boat as a vehicle for small groups of scuba divers.

The double outrigger jukung is but one of many types of Austronesian outrigger canoes that use the crab claw sail. Whilst this sail presents some difficulties in tacking into the wind, actually requiring to jibe around, a jukung is superb in its reaching ability and jibe-safe running. They are usually highly decorated and bear a marlin-like prow.

People in Kalimantan also name their boat jukung. It is used for daily commute to the office, school, or shopping in floating markets (pasar terapung).

Currently there is a modern version of jukung made from high-density polyethylene (HDPE) pipe in Indonesia. Advertised as unsinkable, the main body is made of a closed HDPE pipe that contains sealed air as the source of its buoyancy.

== Type of jukung ==
- Jukung gede (in Balinese language gede means large): A large type of jukung used for transporting 4–5 cows from Bali to Nusa Penida across Lombok strait, often seen in Kusamba beach.
- Jukung payangan: This is the big and famous fish catcher from salompeng. The hull is about 15 m long with 5 crewmen. Payang itself refers to a type of seine used by local fishermen.
- Jukung polangan: The usual type of jukung at Sepulu, with projecting rear end, boom-spar and five seats (called polangan). The front and back "fins" were carved and painted with gold. The hull is using Madurese jukung style.

== 'Great Jukung Race 1988' ==
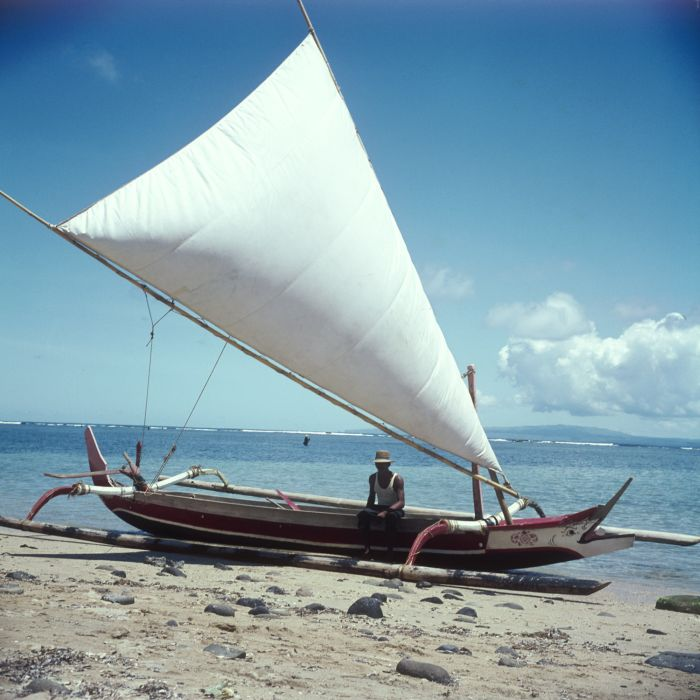
A jukung on a beach, from the Tropenmuseum archives (c. 1970)

In the late 1980s, a seafaring journey of over 1,900 km (1,000 NM) in open outrigger ‘jukung’ canoes was undertaken by nine crews, who sailed from Bali to Darwin across the Timor Sea. Crews were from New Zealand (Christina Campbell, Simon Kerslake), Australia (Rory McGuiness & Rebecca Scott), USA (Mark Levinson, Katherine Connors), England (Neil Turner, Jo Dadd), Japan (Tacou Ueno & Yoko), France (Jean-Pierre & Poucinette), Germany (Miriam & Peter), The Netherlands (Ine Bolsen & Wim Driessen), and Indonesia. The three-month expedition was masterminded by Bob Hobman, filmed and made into a documentary called "Passage out of Paradise", produced by Orana films "The Great Jukung Race 1988". It was featured by the National Geographic Society as "The Great Jukung Race". It was the first expedition of this kind, following purported Austronesian sailing routes in craft dating 7,000 years old.

The expedition started in Bali, where once crews were familiar with sailing their jukungs they embarked on a two-month adventure following the ancient sailing routes used around 1,000 years BC, along the eastern Islands via Komodo Island. They completed the journey with a treacherous 5-day sail across the Arafura Sea to Darwin, via the Tiwi Islands.

Challenges experienced were storms requiring numerous boat repairs, waterspouts, excessive exposure to sun, heat, or rain, adverse currents, and whirlpools. Hazards included near drifting onto war-torn Timor, unpredictable behaviour/welcome from remote villagers, salt water boils, wound infections, malnutrition, near misses with night-time freighters, and sightings of sperm whales and giant white sharks. Some sailors were attacked by a swarm of hornets while preparing to leave a remote beach camp. The crews ultimately rebelled & unanimously decided to sail as a group, as opposed to racing the final leg of the journey, for safety reasons. They avoided the risk of contact with salt water crocodiles and lethal box jellyfish, common in the Northern Territory coastal waters.

All sailors survived a cyclone of more than 110 km/h (68 mph) winds in their tiny 5.6 m (221 in) long, 0.5 m (1 ft 8 in) wide primitive bamboo/rope jukungs, although the Australian crew were lost for two days; they were later located by the Australian coast guard, with a smashed jukung washed up on an island.

The fleet of nine jukungs and 18 international sailors were given a traditional welcome by local Melville Island Aborigines, and successfully reached their final destination of Darwin, Australia.

== See also ==
- Vinta, a similar outrigger boat from the Philippines
- Mayang, another Indonesian fishing boat
- Kakap
- Lancaran
- Penjajap
- Kelulus
- Jong
- Jukung tambangan
