= Bangkong =

War boat of Dayak people

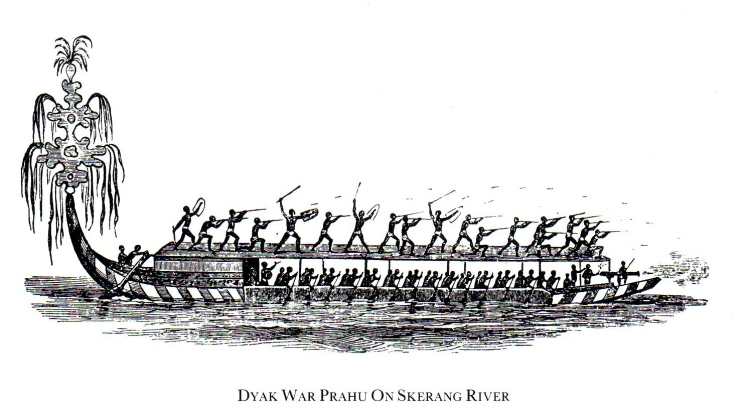
Iban war prahu on Skerang (Skrang) river

Bangkong is the war boat of Dayak people, notably used by sea dayaks (Iban people) of Indonesia, Malaysia and Brunei. Used for riverine warfare in Borneo, the boats were also capable of sailing across the sea.

== Etymology ==
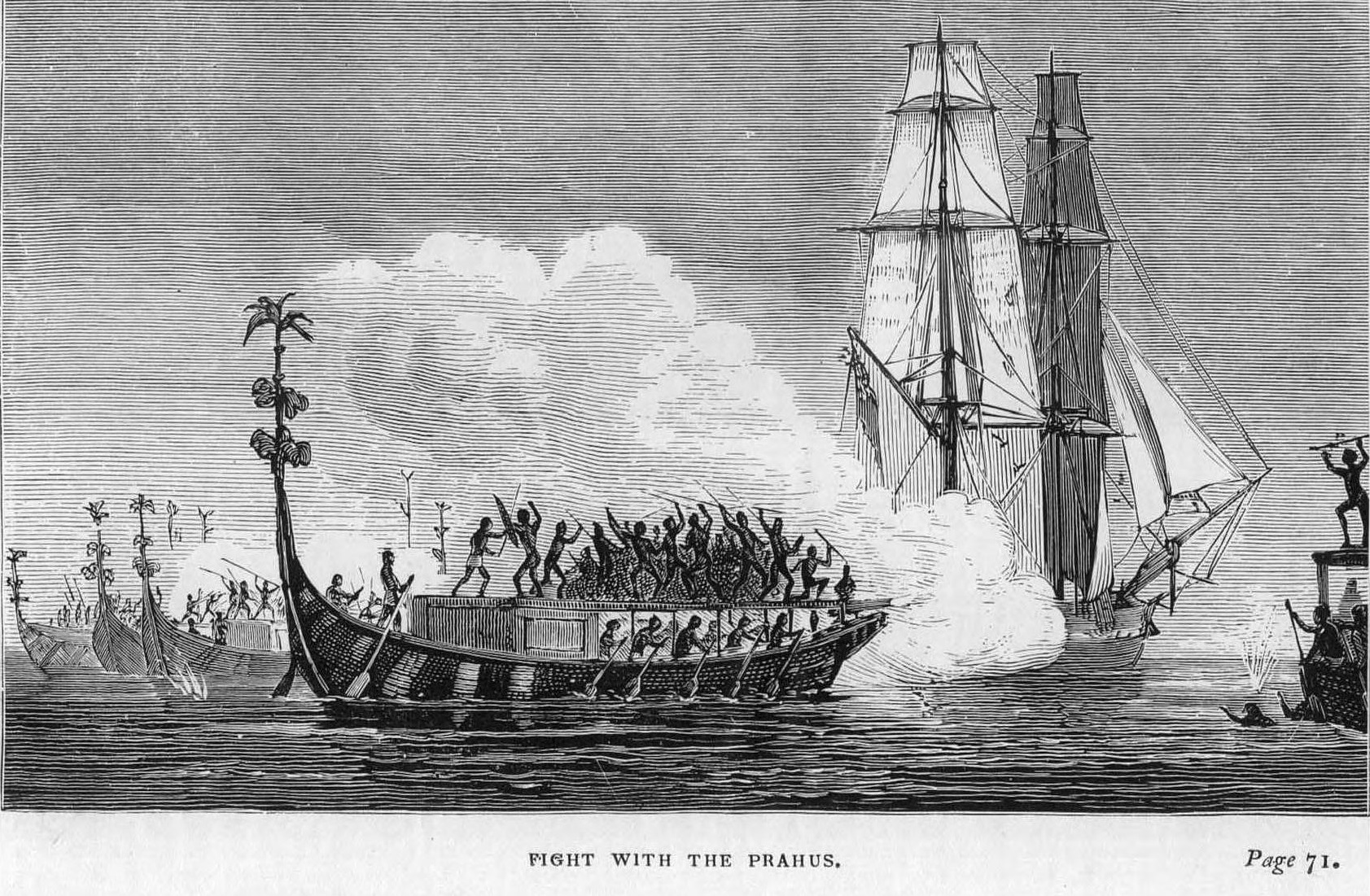
Iban Dayak bangkong fleet attacking brig Lily

The name bangkong may have its roots in the words wa, wangka, waga, wangga, and bangka of Austronesian languages. The term is associated with outrigger perahu or small perahu. This boat is also called perahu pengayau, with the pengayau meaning "raider" or "warrior", thus it can be translated as "war prahu".

== Description ==
These boats are made of a single hollowed out log. Even a large warboat, 90 feet (27 m) long, is made from the trunk of one tree. Planks or gunwales are stitched on the sides, and the seams are caulked, to render the boat watertight. The planks are bound together with rattan, which makes them easy to disassemble. They are usually armed with 1 or 2 lela and a few musket. They could carry 60–80 men. They are propelled by paddle, and they could sustain 6 mph (9.7 km/h) for 18 hours, covering 100 miles (160,9 km) in a day, or 12 mph (19.3 km/h) if closing on a prize.

== Role ==
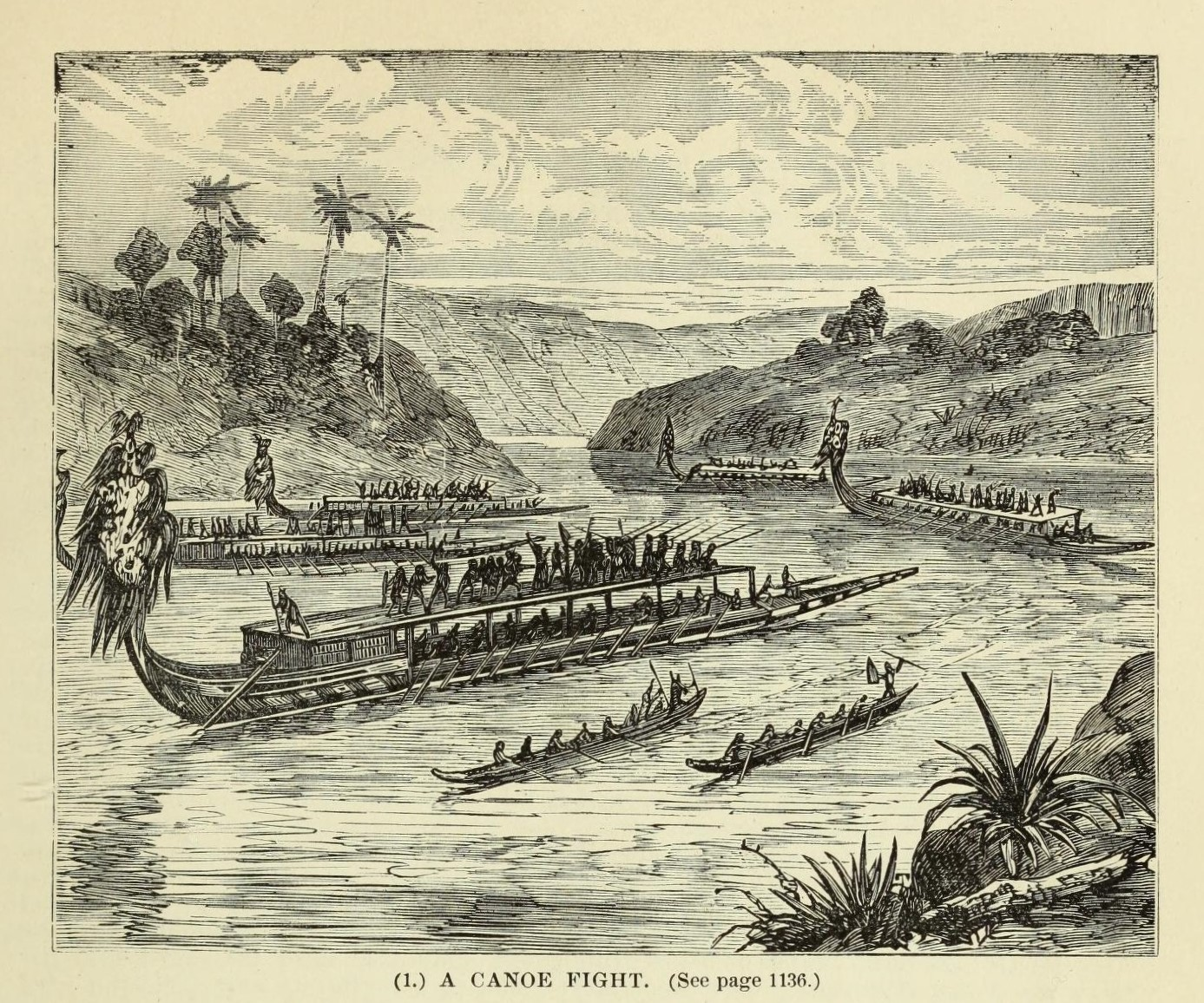
The bait and trap tactic of sea dayak

The bangkong was used for dayak riverine warfare. The sea dayaks, as their name implies, are a maritime set of tribes, and fight chiefly in canoes and boats. One of their favorite tactics is to conceal some of their larger boats, and then to send some small and badly manned canoes forward to attack the enemy to lure them. The canoes then retreat, followed by the enemy, and as soon as they passes the spot where the larger boats are hidden, they are attacked by them in the rear, while the smaller canoes, which have acted as decoys, turn and join in the fight. The rivers arc are chosen for this kind of attack, the overhanging branches of trees and the dense foliage of the bank affording excellent hiding places for the boats.

Many of the sea dayaks were also pirates. In the 19th century there was a great deal of piracy, and it was secretly encouraged by the native rulers, who obtained a share of the spoil, and also by the Malays who knew well how to handle a boat. The Malay fleet consisted of a large number of long war boats or prahu, each about 90 feet (27 m) long or more, and carrying a brass gun in the bow, the pirates being armed with swords, spears and muskets. Each boat was paddled by from 60 to 80 men. These boats skulked about in the sheltered coves waiting for their prey, and attacked merchant vessels making the passage between China and Singapore. The Malay pirates and their Dayak allies would wreck and destroy every trading vessel they came across, murder most of the crew who offered any resistance, and the rest were made as slaves. The Dayak would cut off the heads of those who were slain, smoke them over the fire to dry them, and then take them home to treasure as valued possessions.

In March 1849, Sakarran (Skrang) and Serebas (Saribas) Dayak of Sarawak has a piratical fleet of 200 prahu bangkongs, and since January 1849 the fleet managed to capture several trading boats, devastated two rivers, burnt three villages and slaughtered 400 persons, consist of men, women, and children.

== See also ==
- Salisipan, a rowing boat from the Philippines
- Kakap
- Penjajap
- Kelulus
- Lancaran (ship)
- Kora-kora
