= Ghali (ship) =

Galley-like vessels from Nusantara

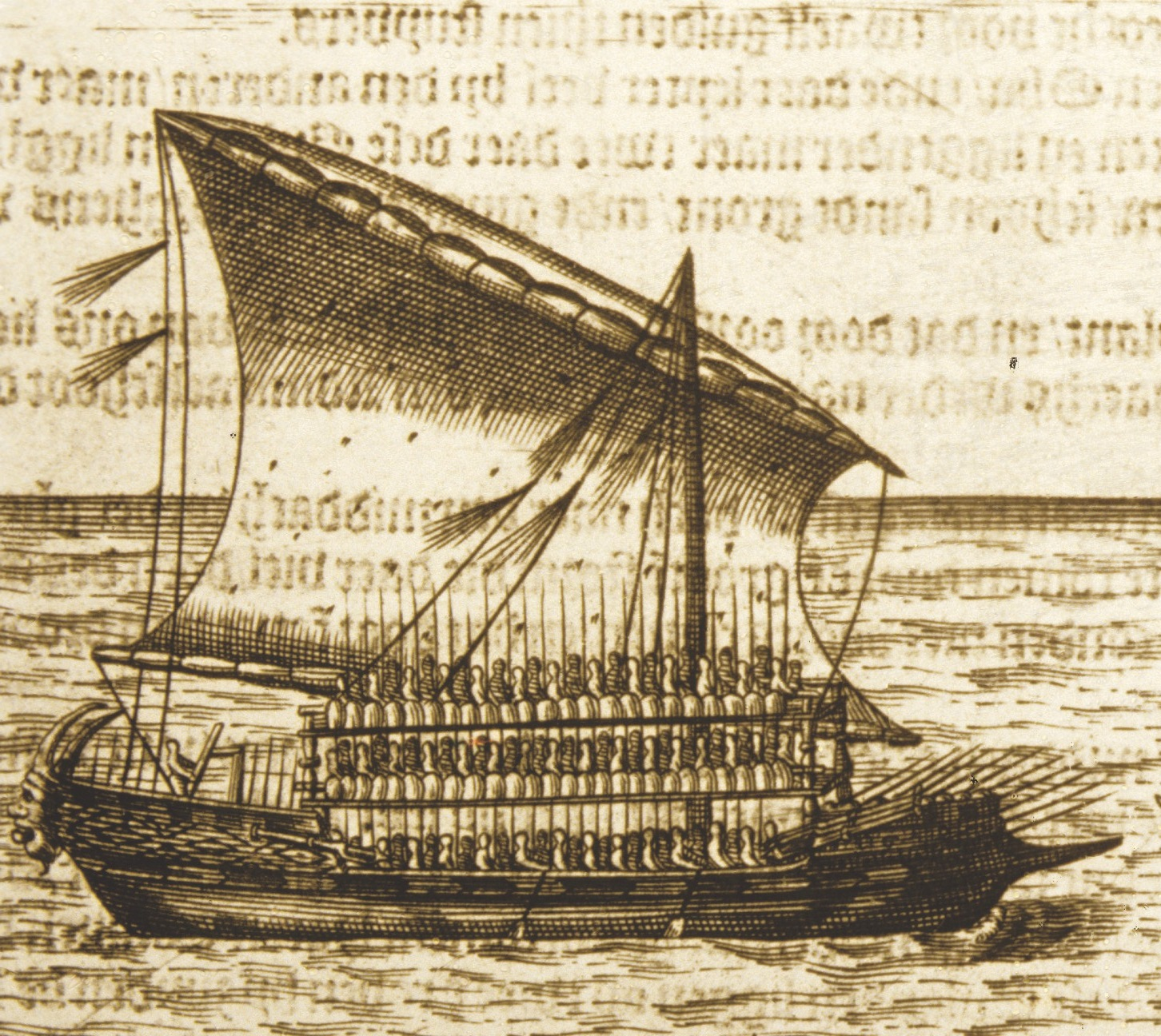
A "galley" from Madura, 1601. Notice the raised fighting platform, three forward-facing cannons, and at least one swivel gun located near the aft of the ship. It may be a rather awkward depiction of a lancaran or a comparable vessel.

Ghali, gali, or gale are a type of galley-like ships from the Malay archipelago. This type of ship only appeared after the 1530s. Before the appearance of this type of ship, several native galley-like ships already existed in the archipelago, some with outriggers. The design of ghali is the result of the impact made by Mediterranean shipbuilding techniques on native shipbuilding, introduced particularly by Arabs, Persians, Ottoman Turks, and Portuguese. The terms may also refer to Mediterranean vessels built by local people, or native vessels with Mediterranean influence.

== Etymology ==
The word ghali and its variation come from the Portuguese word galé, which means galley. The reason for the addition of the letter h is because it is written in Malay texts using jawi script, with an initial ghain (غ) as in ghurab.

== History and description ==
There are several types of vessels using similar names in the archipelago, but the description and construction of each vessel aren't necessarily the same.

=== Malacca ===
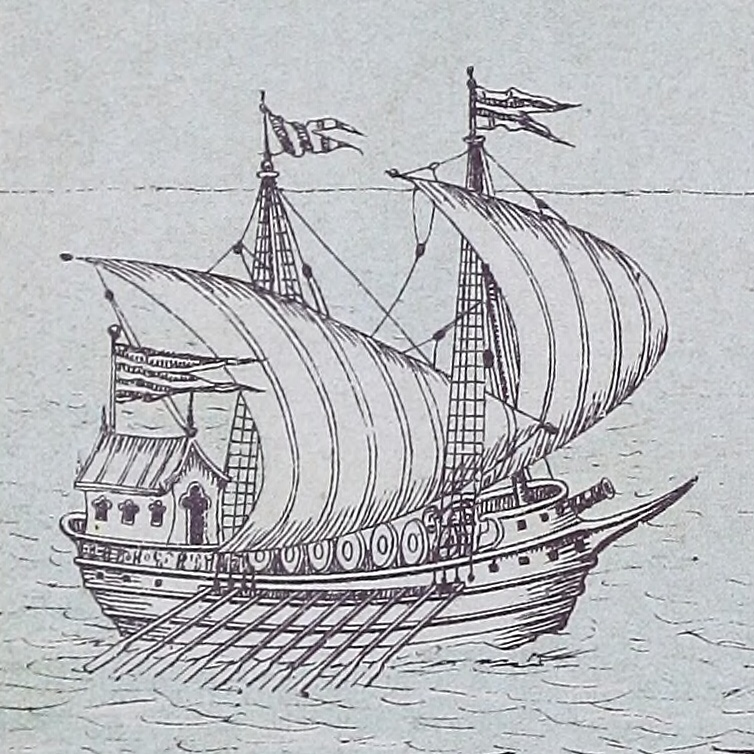
A Malay galley of the 16th centuries.

The Malay epic Hikayat Hang Tuah mentioned a Malaccan royal galley (ghali kenaikan raja) called Mendam Berahi (Malay for "Suppressed Passion"). It was 60 gaz (180 ft or 54.9 m) (Note: 1 Malay gaz equals 33–35 inches or 3 feet. See "gaz". Kamus Dewan (4 ed.). Dewan Bahasa dan Pustaka Malaysia. 2017. p. 383.) long and 6 depa (36 ft or 11 m) wide. It was armed with 7 meriam (native cannon).

However, Mendam Berahi was actually a fictional ship, because it was only mentioned in the fictional literature Hikayat Hang Tuah, and no other Malay manuscripts mentioned its existence. Although HHT's story is set in the Malacca sultanate (1400–1511), it reflects events that occurred in the Johor sultanate in the 17th century, more specifically in Johor's golden age in the 1640s to 1670s. The main character, Hang Tuah, is a fictional character, but the story is based on the true story of Admiral Abd al-Jamil (Tun Abdul Jamil) from Johor. Contemporary Portuguese records indicate that galleys appeared in the regional fleets during the late 1530s, before that the mainstay of the Malay fleet was the lancaran. It was not until the 1560s that the ghali became more widespread, mostly used by Acehnese people, not Malays. The word "ghali" itself is a loanword from the Portuguese language, so the existence of ghali during the heyday of the Malacca sultanate is an anachronism.

The Malays prefer to use shallow draught, oared longships similar to the galley, such as lancaran, penjajap, and kelulus for their war fleet. (Note: During the 1511 Portuguese attack on Malacca Sultanate, the Malays use lancaran (lanchara) and penjajap (pangajaoa). Kelulus (calaluz) was used on several expeditions before and after the fall of Malacca.) This is very different from the Javanese who prefer long-range, deep-draught round ships such as jong and malangbang. The reason for this difference is that the Malays operated their ships in riverine water, sheltered straits zone, and archipelagic environment, while the Javanese are often active in the open and high sea. After contact with Iberian people, both the Javanese and Malay fleets began to use the ghurab and ghali more frequently.

=== Eastern Indonesia ===
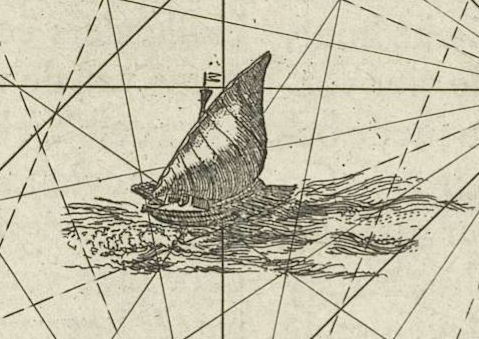
A galley in full sail, at the west of the island of Gilolo (now Halmahera).

In eastern Indonesia, a type of vessel called galé (lit. galley) was adapted by the Spanish and the Portuguese for use in the Philippines and eastern Indonesia. The vessel narrowed considerably fore and aft. The length is 7 or 8 times its width. They have a deck that extends the length of the boat and was propelled by long oars. Fighting men is situated in a dedicated deck, and shields were placed along the whole length of the galley to protect the rowers and the soldiers.

=== Aceh ===
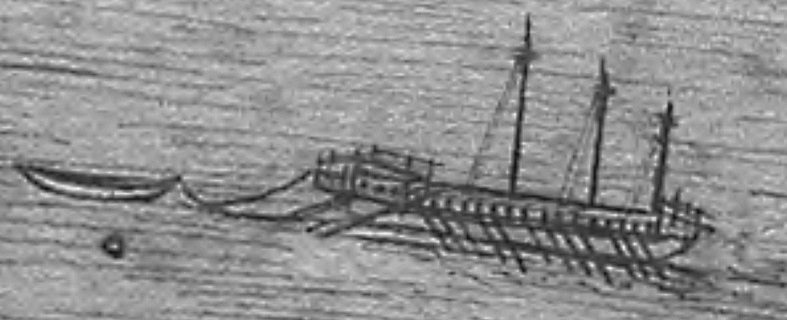
An Acehnese galley-like vessel towing a smaller boat, during the 1568 siege of Malacca. The ship has 3 masts and double quarter rudders, also propelled with 12 rows of oars. As it has 3 masts, it may be a "lancaran bertiang tiga" (three-masted lancaran).

The Sultanate of Aceh is famous for the use of Ottoman-derived galleys. Aceh's term for galley is ghali, which is derived from the Portuguese word galé, not from the Turkish term for it (Kadırga). The Acehnese in the 1568 siege of Portuguese Malacca used 4 large galleys of about 40–50 meters long each with 190 rowers in 24 banks. They were armed with 12 large camelos (3 at each bow side, 4 at the stern), 1 basilisk (bow-mounted), 12 falcons, and 40 swivel guns. By then cannons, firearms, and other war materials had come annually from Jeddah, and the Turks also sent military experts, galleys experts, and technicians. The average Acehnese galley in the second half of the 16th century would have been about 50 meters long and had two masts that were equipped with square sails and topsails, not lateen sails like those of Portuguese galleys. It would have been propelled by 24 oars on each side, carrying about 200 men aboard, and armed with about 20 cannons (2 or 3 large ones at the bow, with the rest being swivel guns).

In the 1575 siege, Aceh used 40 two-masted galleys with Turkish captains carrying 200–300 soldiers of Turk, Arab, Deccanis, and Aceh origins. The state galleys (ghorab istana) of Aceh, Daya, and Pedir were said to carry 10 meriam, 50 lela, and 120 cecorong (excluding the istinggar). The smaller galley carried 5 meriam, 20 lela, and 50 cecorong. Western and native sources mention that Aceh had 100–120 galleys at any time (excluding the smaller fusta and galiot), spread from Daya (west coast) to Pedir (east coast). One galley captured by the Portuguese in 1629 during Iskandar Muda's reign is very large, and it was reported there were a total of 47 of them. She reached 100 m in length and 17 m in width, had 3 masts with square sails and topsails, was propelled by 35 oars on each side, and was able to carry 700 men. It is armed with 98 guns: 18 large cannons (five 55-pounders at the bow, one 25-pounder at the stern, the rest were 17 and 18-pounders), 80 falcons, and many swivel guns. The ship is called "Espanto do Mundo" (terror of the universe), which is probably a translation from Cakradonya (Cakra Dunia). The Portuguese reported that it was bigger than anything ever built in the Christian world and the height of its castle could compete with the height of galleons.

=== Java ===
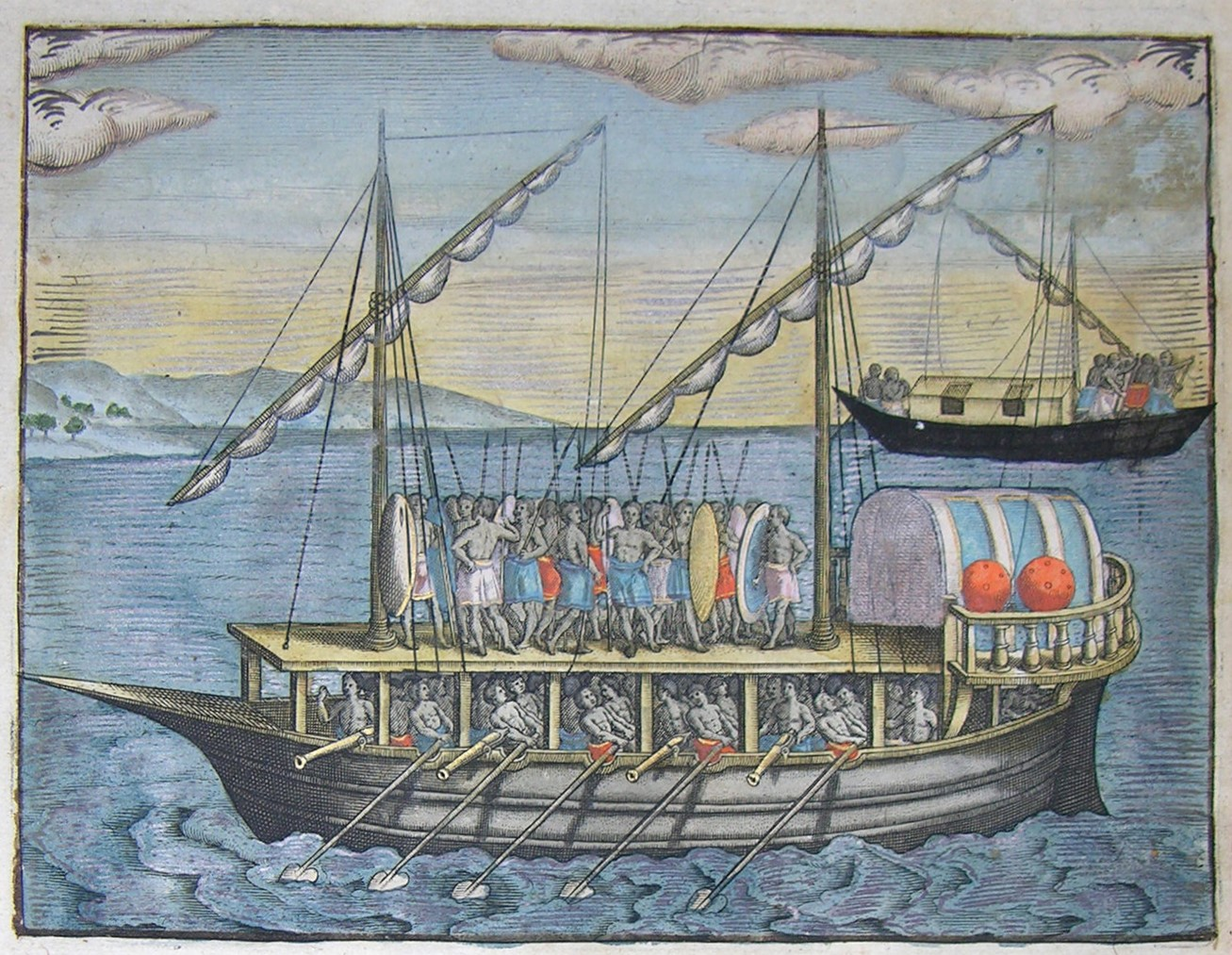
A galley from Banten, 1598. Four cetbang can be seen.

Two Dutch engravings from 1598 and 1601 depicted galley from Banten and Madura. They had two and one masts, respectively. The major difference from Mediterranean galleys, this galley had raised fighting platform called "balai" in which the soldier stood, a feature common in warships of the region. Javanese galleys and galley-like vessels are built according to instruction from Turks living in Banten.

=== Sulawesi ===
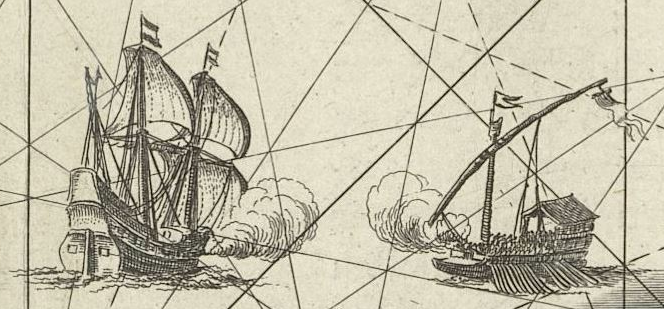
A native galley engaging a Dutch galleon, west of the island of Ternate.

The Sultanate of Gowa of the mid-17th century had galle' (or galé) 40 m long and 6 m breadth, carrying 200–400 men. Other galle' of the kingdom varied between 23 and 35 m in length. The ships were used by the king of Gowa to conduct voyages and sea trade between islands in the archipelago, both in the west (Malacca, Riau, Mempawah, Kalimantan) and in the east (Banda, Timor, Flores, Bima, Ternate, and North Australia).

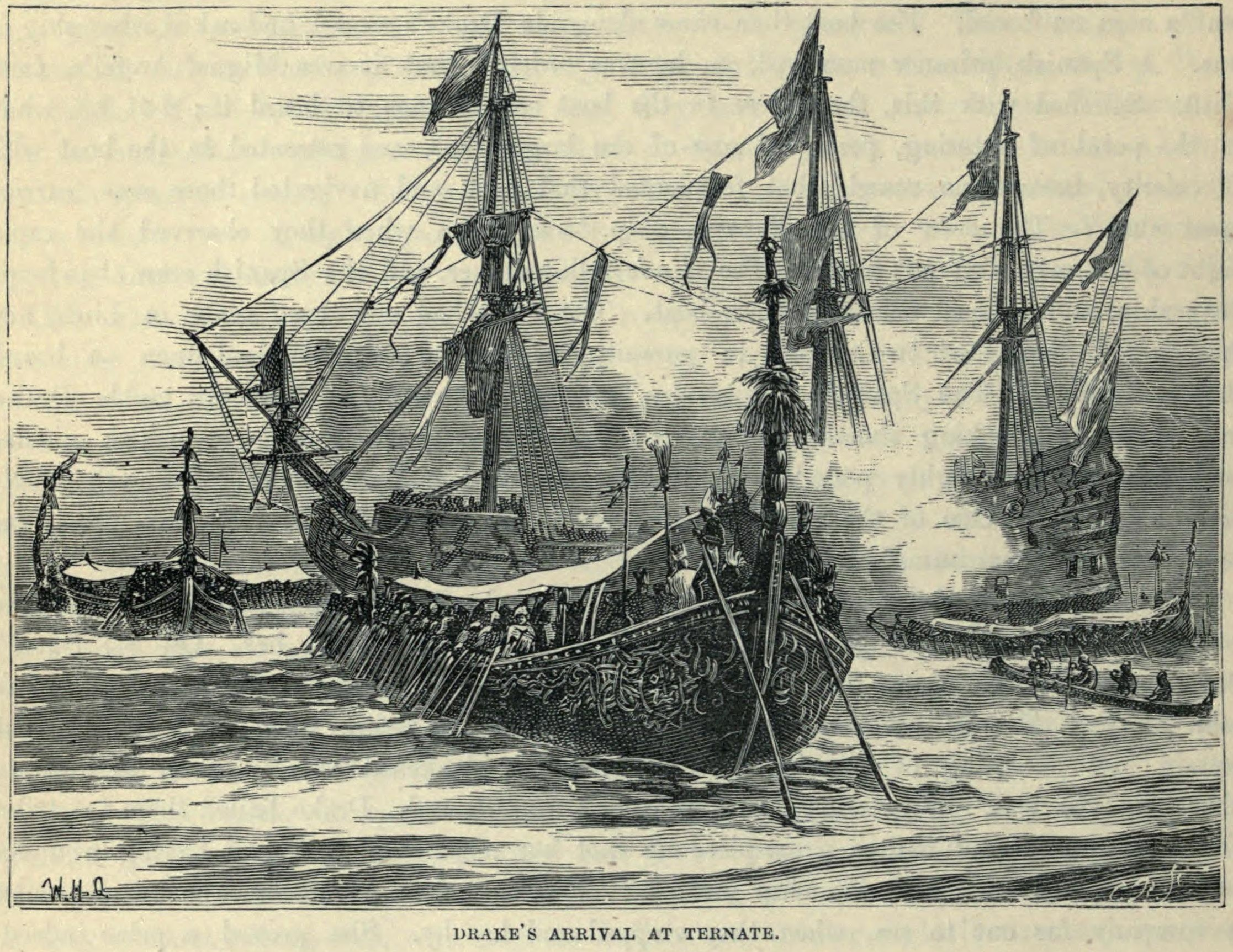
Ternatean galleys welcomed the arrival of Francis Drake.

Karaeng Matoaja, government director of Gowa and prince of Tallo, among other things, had nine galleys, which he had built in the year in which Buton was conquered (1626). The ships are called galé. Their dimensions are 20 depah (36.6 m) long and 3 depah (5.5 m) wide. They had three rudders: Two Indonesian rudders on either side of the stern, and a European axial rudder. It is not strange that Makassar had galleys in the 17th century. Gowa has maintained friendly relations with the Portuguese since 1528.

This kind of ship is usually owned by the rich people and kings of Makassar. For inter-island trading, Makassarean gale ships were considered the most powerful ship, and therefore used by Makassar and Malayan noblemen to transport spices from the Moluccas. The usage of the gale improved the maritime trading in Gowa, as well as other ports in South Sulawesi, since the 16th century.

== See also ==
- Lancaran, the backbone of the Malay fleet before Mediterranean influence came
- Jong, a large sailing ship from Nusantara
- Penjajap
- Ghurab
- Kelulus, Javanese rowing ship
