= Ghurab =

Warship from Nusantara archipelago

A portion of Miller atlas, showing a galley, dhow, and Ottoman ghurābs of the Arabian sea.

Ghurab or gurab is a type of merchant and warship from the Nusantara archipelago. The ship was a result of Mediterranean influences in the region, particularly introduced by the Arabs, Persians, and Ottomans. For their war fleet, the Malays prefer to use shallow draught, oared longships similar to the galley, such as lancaran, penjajap, and kelulus. (Note: During the 1511 Portuguese attack on Malacca Sultanate, the Malays use lancaran (lanchara) and penjajap (pangajaoa). Kelulus (calaluz) was used on several expeditions before and after the fall of Malacca.) This is very different from the Javanese who prefer long-range, deep-draught round ships such as jong and malangbang. The reason for this difference is that the Malays operated their ships in riverine water, sheltered straits zone, and archipelagic environment, while the Javanese are often active in the open and high sea. After contact with Iberian people, both the Javanese and Malay fleets began to use the ghurab and ghali more frequently.

== Etymology ==
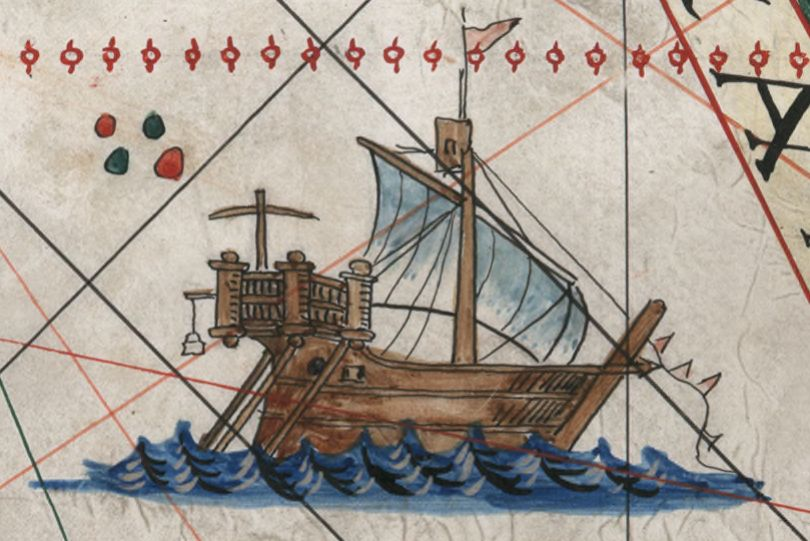
In the Indian ocean, 1519.

The name of this ship includes gorap, gorab, gurab, ghurap, gurap, and benawa gurab. The name comes from the Arab word "ghurāb" or "ghorāb", meaning raven or crow. The word also means "vessel" or "galley" in Arabic or Persian. The word benawa or banawa comes from the Old Javanese language, which means boat or ship. In the Malay language the meaning is more or less the same. In different languages, the word can refer to different types of ships and boats, depending on the context of the sentence.

== Description ==
South of Seram island, 1519.

Ghurab is a medium to large-sized trading vessel. They can be converted into a warship by adding swivel guns (rentaka). Early ghurab was galley-like, it has oars in addition to sails.

The larger ghurab had 2 guns pointing forward (bow-chaser) and 15 on each side, with a total of 32 guns. The smaller ones carried 2 forward and 10 on each side (22 guns). The ghurab has a projecting stern. They may carry up to 3 masts. H. Warington Smyth, in 1902 described a large 2-masted trading gurap built of giam wood. The dimension is as follows: 300 ft (91.4 m) long, 30 ft (9.1 m) wide, 20 ft (6.1 m) depth, and 11 ft (3.4 m) freeboard. The capacity was 100 koyan (241.9 metric tons), with a 100 ft (30.5 m) mainmast, crewed by 30 men. The vessel is using fore-and-aft sail made with cloth, with yard and gaff-topsail.

== Role ==
Ghurab is used as a trading ship as well as a warship. One of the earliest accounts of ghurab has a background from the mid-14th century, mentioned in the Hikayat Raja-Raja Pasai of 1390s. The ghurab was said to be a ship of Majapahit empire, used to carry a princess named Radin Galoh Gemerenchang to marry a Pasai nobleman. Ghurab was also used as a warship alongside the jong by the senapati ing alaga (commander-in-chief) of Majapahit.

The Hikayat Hang Tuah, which has a background of the late 15th to the early 16th century and was composed no earlier than the 17th century, mentioned that two pencalang and two ghurab were used by Majapahit to send a letter and gifts to improve the relationship with Malacca. The ghurabs were said to be "in the style of the Arabs' (ship)".

Until the early 16th century, the main merchant and warship of the Javanese was the jong, but since the mid-16th century the maritime forces of the archipelago began to use new types of agile naval vessels that could be equipped with larger cannons: In various attacks on Portuguese Malacca after the defeat of Pati Unus, they no longer used jong but used lancaran, ghurab, and ghali.

In 1515, Bintan attacked Kampar and Portuguese Malacca with 24 lancaran and 6 large ones called gurab. Pigafetta's Italian-Malay vocabulary of 1521 (published 1524) mentioned Malay gurap as a galley (a la galia).

A ghurab, west of Aceh, Sumatra.

The Hikayat Aceh states that the Acehnese sultanate had 120 large ghurab in the 1570s. The state ghurab (ghorab istana) of Aceh, Daya, and Pedir was said to carry 10 meriam, 50 lela, and 120 cecorong (excluding the istinggar). Smaller ones carried 5 meriam, 20 lela, and 50 cecorong.

In 1624, the war fleet of the Mataram Sultanate numbered 2000 vessels consisting of gurab and small perahu. On 22 August 1628, 59 goraps of Sultan Agung's navy appeared at Batavia, unloading provisions for the Siege of Batavia.

== Ships with similar name ==
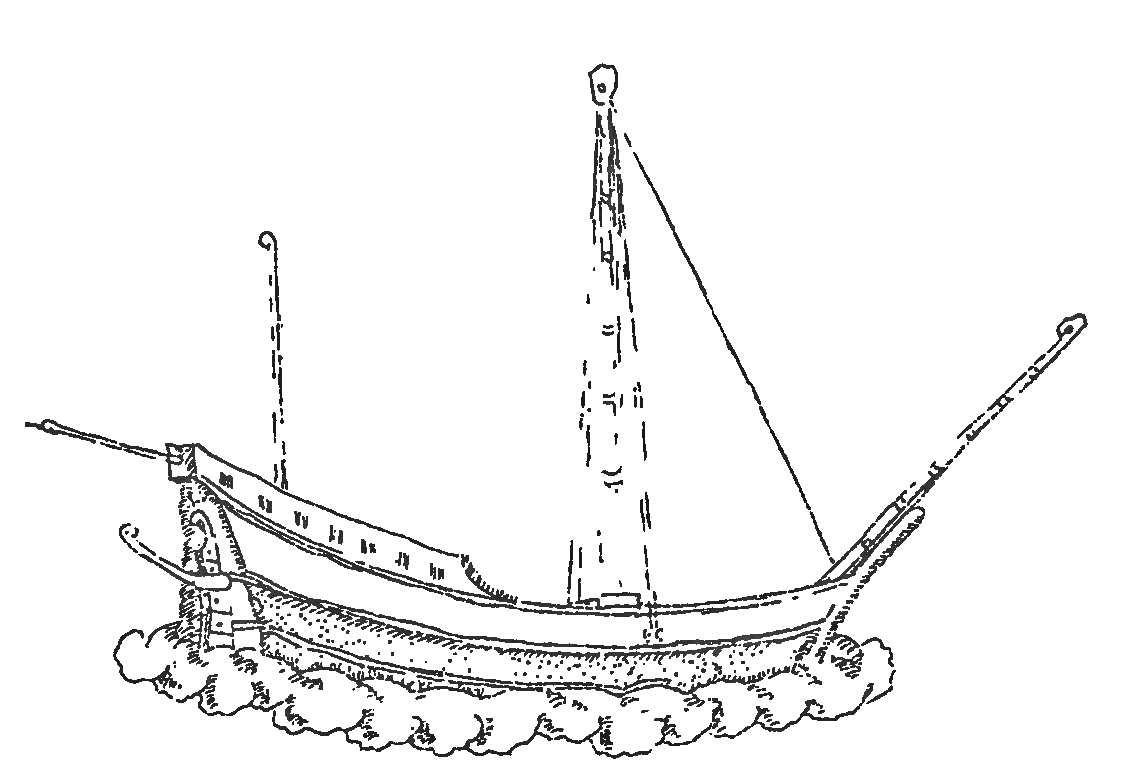
A gelue of Red Sea.

There are several types of ships historically also called ghurab or similar names. The description and construction of each vessel, however, aren't necessarily the same.

=== Mediterranean ===
According to Al-Maqrizi (1441 A.D.), ghurābs of the mediterranean sea were huge war galleys. According to Ibn Mammati (1209 A.D.), these ships had 140 oars. Al-Maqrizi refers to both Muslim and Christian galleys as ghurāb. Reinaud said that ghorāb was the name given by Moors to true galleys. Ubaldo (1181) tells about ghurāb as vessels sailing to and from Tripoli.

Genizah letters mention cargo ghurābs that sailed from the Maghrib, Sicily, and on the Nile, carrying carob and flax.

=== Indian Ocean ===
Indian Ocean ghurāb, which often appears in the records of the 17th century was a native Arab-Persian and Indian cargo, pirate, and war vessel.

Abu Shama ca. 1266–1267, in Kitab al-rawdatayn fi akhbar al-dawlatayn, wrote about ghurāb:

"They sail by their masts (i.e. the sails); they (look like) quivers, but penetrate like arrows . . . It is no surprise that they are called ghurābs because they spread their wings like those of a dove"

Sidi Ali in 1552, describes ghurābs as "great (rowing) vessels"; he also says that smaller ghurābs are "galliots with oars".

Grab of Malabar coast is a vessel that was generally of shallow draft, and broad in proportion to its length. Size could range between 150 and as much as 500 tons (bm).

== See also ==
- Lancaran, backbone of Malay fleet before mediterranean influence came
- Jong, large sailing ship from Nusantara
- Lancang
- Penjajap
- Ghali
- Kelulus, Javanese rowing ship
