= Kakap =

Kakap can refer to:

- Kakap (boat), a small traditional war canoe used by the Moro people and Malay people usually in conjunction with Garay warships
- Snappers, known in the Malay language as kakap
