= Lancaran (ship) =

Type of ship similar to galley from Nusantara

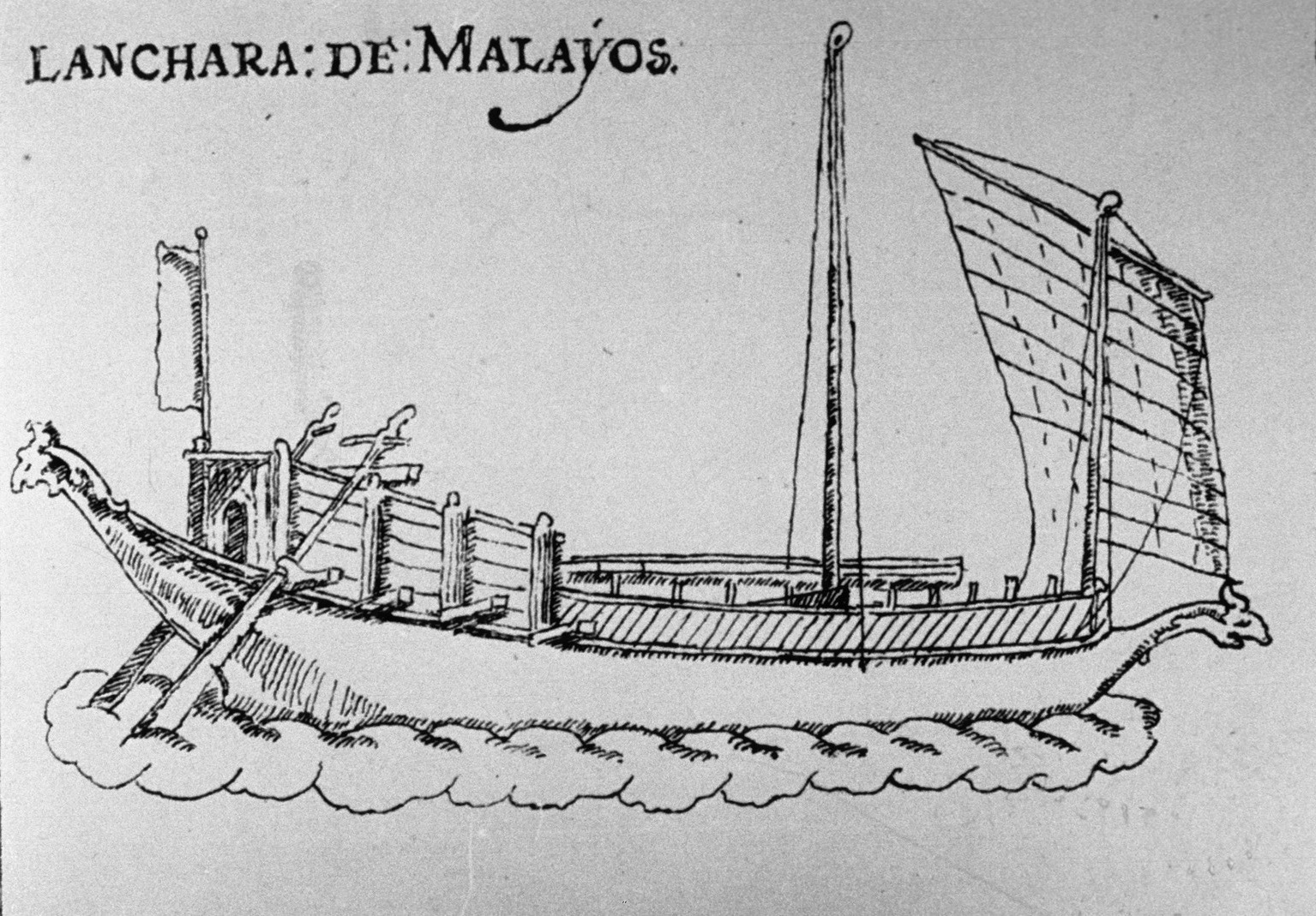
A lanchara as drawn by Manuel Godinho de Erédia, 1613.

A lancaran or lanchara is a type of sailing ship used in Maritime Southeast Asia. Although similar in shape to Mediterranean galleys, the lancaran was the backbone of the regional fleet of the western half of Nusantara before Mediterranean influence came. For their war fleet, the Malays prefer to use shallow draught, oared longships similar to the galley, such as lancaran, penjajap, and kelulus. (Note: During the 1511 Portuguese attack on Malacca Sultanate, the Malays use lancaran (lanchara) and penjajap (pangajaoa). Kelulus (calaluz) was used on several expeditions before and after the fall of Malacca.) This is very different from the Javanese who prefer long-range, deep-draught round ships such as jong and malangbang. The reason for this difference is that the Malays operated their ships in riverine water, sheltered straits zone, and archipelagic environment, while the Javanese are often active in the open and high sea. After contact with Iberian people, both the Javanese and Malay fleets began to use the ghurab and ghali more frequently.

== Etymology ==
The term lancaran is derived from the Malay word lancar, which means "swift", "fast", "not hindered", and "velocity without effort". Thus the word lancaran may be interpreted as "swift vessel".

== Description ==
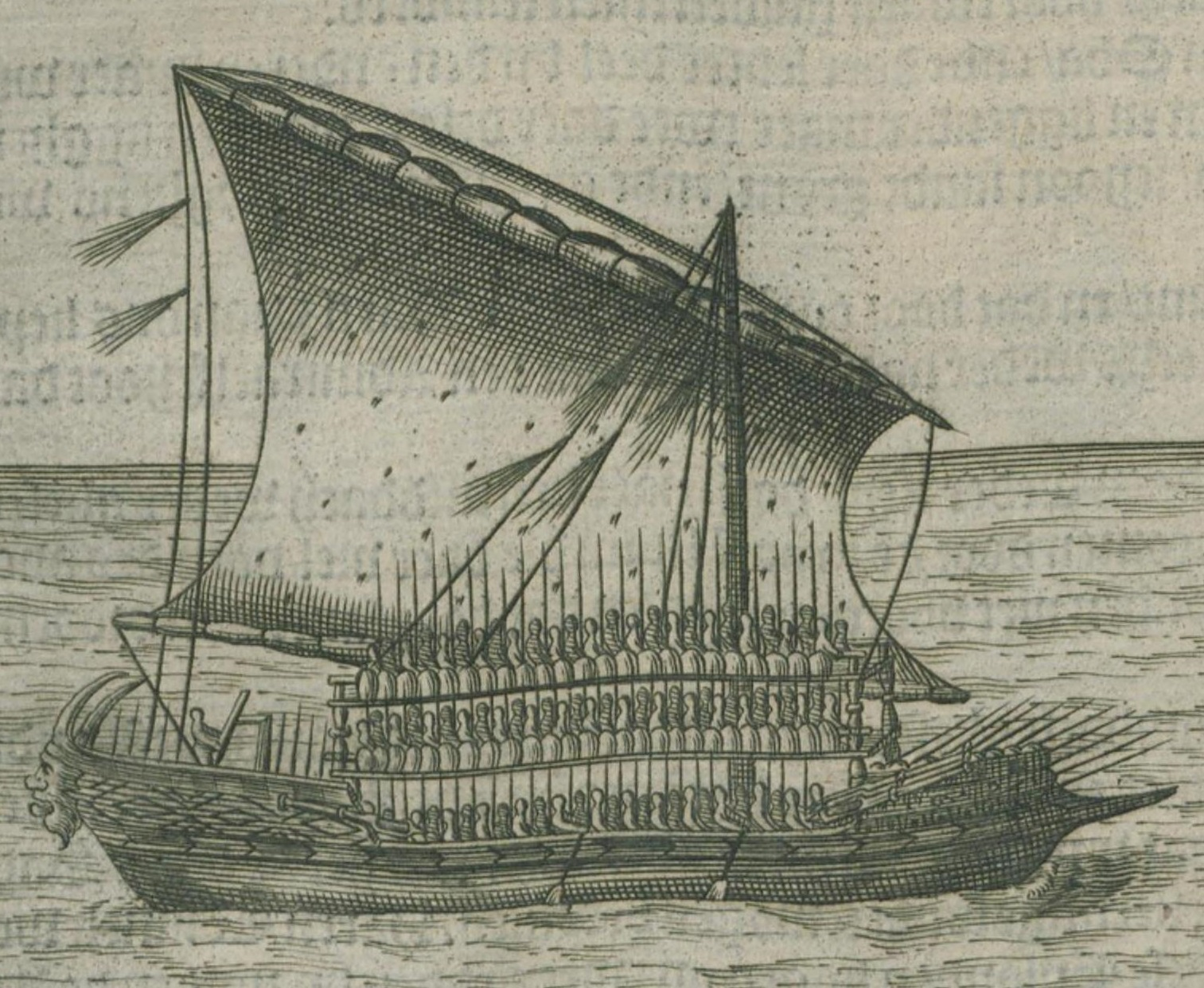
A galley or lancaran from Madura, 1601. Notice the balai (raised fighting platform), three forward-facing cetbang, and at least one cetbang located near the aft of the ship.

Lancaran is a swift, local ship propelled by oars and sails with two-quarter rudders, one on either side of the stern. In Aceh, lancarans were taller than galley but equaled them in length. They had one, two, or three masts, with junk sails or tanja sails (canted rectangular sail). Lancarans had a crew of between 150 and 200 crew. Lancaran can be equipped with several lela (medium cannon equivalent to falconet) and swivel guns of cetbang and rentaka variety. One distinguishing feature from the galley is the presence of an elevated fighting platform (called a balai), in which warriors usually stood and perform boarding actions. Cargo lancaran could carry 150 tons of cargo. The lancaran of Sunda had unique masts shaped like a crane, with steps between each so that they are easy to navigate.

== Role ==
Lancaran were used both as warships and for commerce. In the 14th–15th century CE, the Kingdom of Singapura and Sungai Raya each have 100 three-masted lancaran (lancaran bertiang tiga).

In about 1500 CE, the Sultanate of Malacca opposed Siam with 200 boats, consisting of lancaran and kelulus. According to Afonso de Albuquerque, during the 1511 Portuguese attack on the Malacca Sultanate, the Malays used an unspecified number of lancaran (lanchara) and twenty penjajap (pangajaoa). After Sultan Mahmud Shah of Malacca was deposed from Malacca in 1511, he took over Bintan. In 1519 and 1520 he had a fleet consisting of 60 and 100 boats respectively, both being made up of lancaran and kelulus.

During the Demak Sultanate attack on Portuguese Malacca of 1512–1513, lancaran were used as armed troop transports for landing alongside penjajap and kelulus, as the Javanese junks were too large to approach the shore. Lancaran was the other type of vessel counted by Tome Pires after junks and penjajap upon arriving at a port.

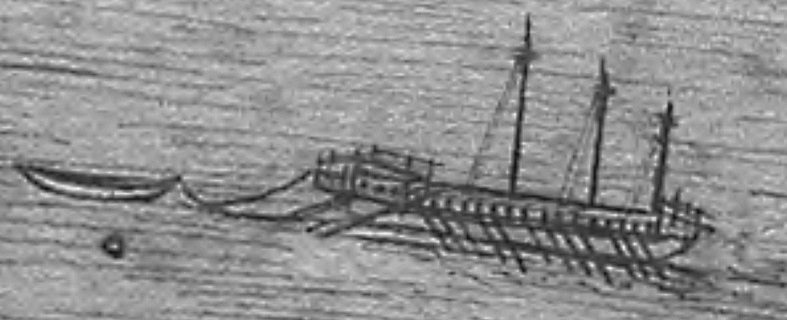
An Acehnese galley-like vessel towing a smaller boat, during the 1568 siege of Malacca. The ship has 3 masts and double quarter rudder, also propelled with 12 rows of oars.

Royal lancaran of Lingga is said to carry 200 fighting men and is about the size of a large galleass (larger than ordinary galleys). The regular lancaran of Pasai is said to carry 150 men and is under the command of a Javanese captain. Large ones with 300 crew are said to have been Javanese vessels. In the 1520s, smaller lancarans of Bintan and Pahang were armed with only 1 berço (breech-loading swivel gun, likely refers to cetbang), but also had arrows, spears, and fire-hardened wooden spars. Nicolau Perreira's account of the 1568 Acehnese siege of Malacca said that Aceh's boats are usually lancaran. It has two rows of oars and was as long as a galley. An anonymous work depicting the 1568 siege showed a ship with a double quarter rudder and 3 masts, which corresponds with "lancaran bertiang tiga" (three-masted lancaran) mentioned in Malay texts.

== See also ==
- Balangay
- Garay (ship)
- Penjajap
- Pinisi
- Launch (boat), the term is derived from lancaran
- Galleas
