= Djong =

Javanese sailing ship

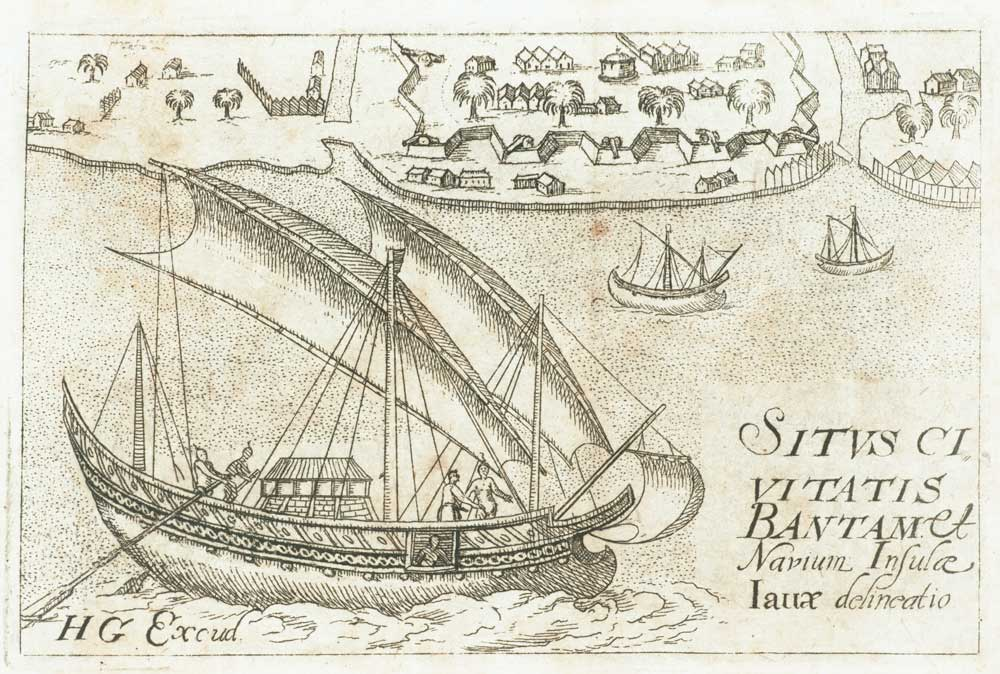
Depiction of a three-masted Javanese jong in Banten, by Hieronymus Megiser, 1610

The djong, jong, jung, or original junk is a type of sailing ship originating from Java that was widely used by Javanese sailors. The word was and is spelled jong in its languages of origin, the "djong" spelling was a colonial Dutch romanization. In English, the jong lends its name to other ships of similar configuration, called junks, and to their characteristic style of rigging, the junk rig.

Jongs are used mainly as seagoing passenger and cargo vessels. They traveled as far as the Atlantic Ocean in the medieval era. Their tonnage ranged from 40 to 2000 deadweight tons, (Note: The tonnage used in this page (unless stated otherwise) is DWT or deadweight tonnage, a measure of how much cargo a ship can carry, including the weight of passengers and supplies.) with an average deadweight of 1200–1400 tons during the Majapahit era. Javanese kingdoms such as Majapahit, Demak Sultanate, and Kalinyamat Sultanate occasionally used these vessels as warships, but they were still predominantly transport vessels. The Mataram Sultanate primarily used jongs as merchant ships rather than warships.

== Etymology ==
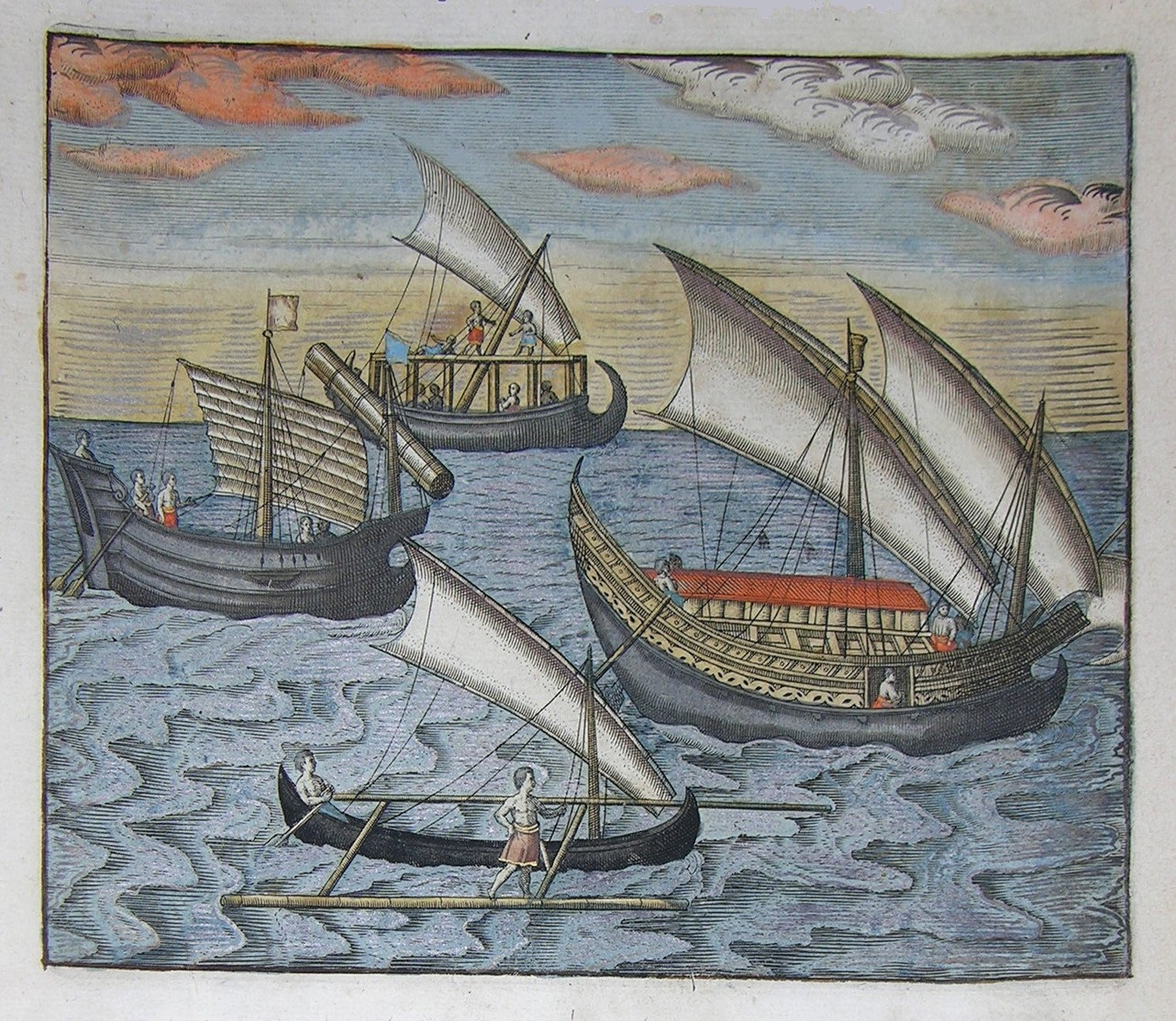
Early European illustration of jongs and other smaller craft in Banten (D'Eerste Boeck, c. 1599), note the double rudders which distinguished Southeast Asian ships from the Chinese chuán which had a central rudder; a 32–40-ton djong is depicted on the right with 2 tanja sails, a bowsprit sail, and the bridge (an opening in the lower deck)

It was claimed the word jong, jung, jüng, or junk comes from Southern Min Chinese, specifically Hokkien Chinese: 船; Pe̍h-ōe-jī: chûn; lit. 'boat', 'ship'. However, Chinese ocean-going tradition in Southeast Asia was relatively new – until the 12th century, most trade between the regions was carried in Southeast Asian vessels. Paul Pelliot and Waruno Mahdi reject the Chinese origin of the name. Instead, it may be derived from "jong" (transliterated as joṅ) in Old Javanese which means ship. (Note: Probably ultimately from Proto-Mon-Khmer *d₂luuŋ, *d₂luuŋ, *d₂luŋ, *d₂luəŋ or *d₂ləŋ (lit. 'boat') before transmitted through Old Javanese joṅ but still dubious.) One of the earliest records of Old Javanese jong comes from Sembiran inscriptions found in Bali, dates back to the 11th century CE. The word was borrowed by the Sumatrans (particularly in Malay) and possibly recorded by the 15th century thus practically excludes the Chinese origin of the word in Sumatran (Malay). The late 15th century Undang-Undang Laut Melaka, a maritime code composed by Javanese shipowners in Melaka, uses jong frequently as the word for freight ships. European writings from 1345 through 1609 use a variety of related terms, including jonque (French), ioncque, ionct, giunchi, zonchi (Italian), iuncque, joanga, juanga (Spanish), junco (Portuguese), and ionco, djonk, jonk (Dutch).

The origin of the word "junk" in the English language, can be traced to the Portuguese word junco, which is rendered from the Arabic word j-n-k (جنك). This word comes from the fact that Arabic script cannot represent the digraph "ng". The word used to denote both the Javanese ship (jong) and the Chinese ship (chûn), even though the two were markedly different vessels. After the disappearance of jong in the 17th century, the meaning of "junk" (and other similar words in European languages), which until then was used as a transcription of the word "jong" in Javanese and Sumatran (Palembang and Malay), changed its meaning to exclusively refer to the Chinese ship.

Native Indonesians from the Indonesian Archipelago usually refer to large Chinese ships as "wangkang", while small ones are called "top". There are also terms (especially in Palembang, which later borrowed to Indonesian and Malay), "cunea", "cunia", and "cunya" that originate from Amoy Hokkien Chinese 船仔 (Pe̍h-ōe-jī: chûn-á), which refers to Chinese vessels 10–20 m in length. The "djong" spelling is of colonial Dutch origin, rendering the j sound as "dj", though both traditional British and current Indonesian orthography romanizes it as jong.

== Sailing and navigation ==
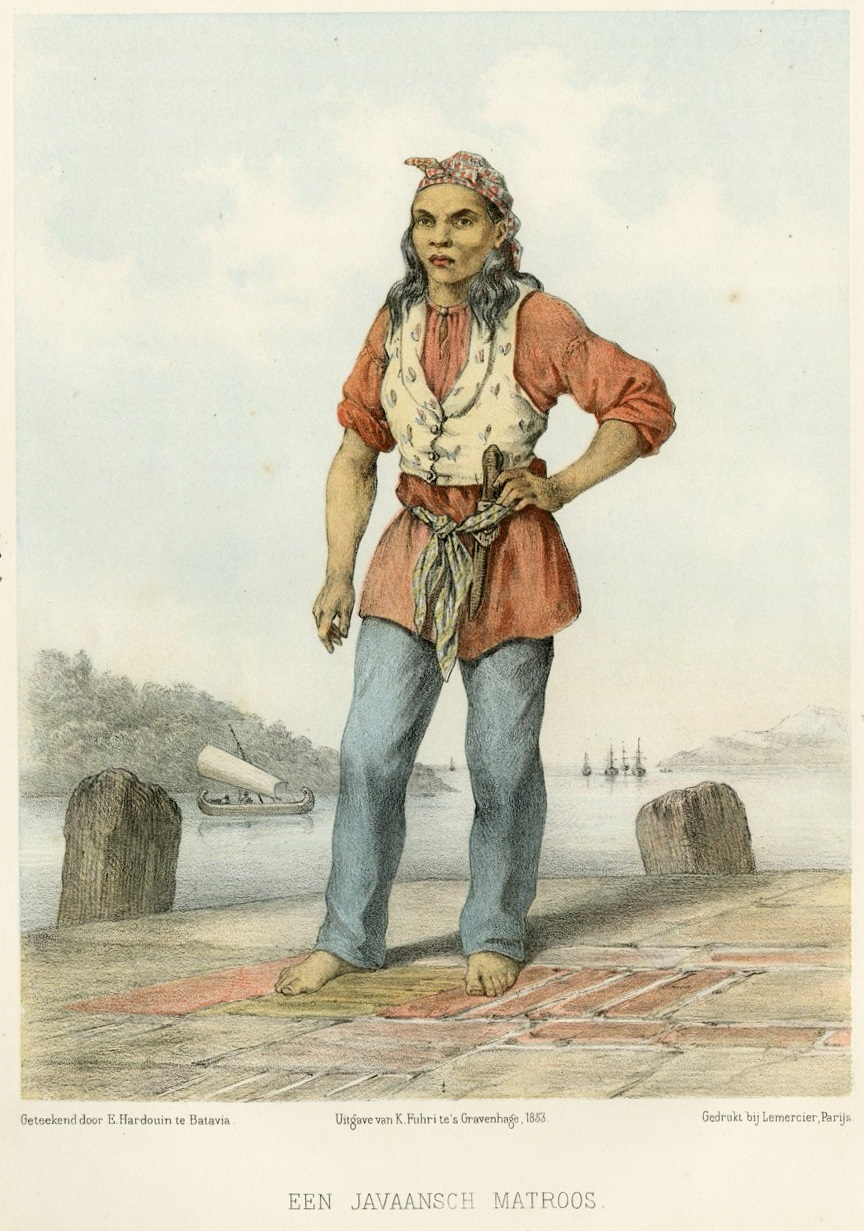
A Javanese sailor

The Nusantara archipelago was known for the production of large junks. When Portuguese sailors reached the waters of Southeast Asia in the early 1500s they found this area dominated by Javanese junk ships, operating on the vital spice route, between Moluccas, Java, and Malacca. The port city of Malacca at that time practically became a Javanese city. Many Javanese merchants and ship captains settled and at the same time controlled international trade. Many skilled Javanese carpenters are building ships in the dockyards of the largest port city in Southeast Asia.

For seafaring, the Austronesian people invented the balance lugsail (tanja sail), probably developed from the fixed mast version of the crab claw sail. The junk rig commonly used on Chinese ships may have been developed from the tanja sail.

During the Majapahit era, almost all of the commodities from Asia were found in Java. This is because of extensive shipping by the Majapahit empire using various types of ships, particularly the jong, for trading to faraway places. Ma Huan (Zheng He's translator) who visited Java in 1413, stated that ports in Java were trading goods and offered services that were more numerous and more complete than other ports in Southeast Asia. It was also during the Majapahit era that Nusantaran exploration reached its greatest accomplishment. Ludovico di Varthema (1470–1517), in his book Itinerario de Ludouico de Varthema Bolognese stated that the Southern Javanese people sailed to "far Southern lands" up to the point they arrived at an island where a day only lasted four hours long and was "colder than in any part of the world". Modern studies have determined that such a place is located at least 900 nautical miles (1666 km) south of the southernmost point of Tasmania.

The Austronesian people used a solid navigation system: Orientation at sea is carried out using a variety of different natural signs, and by using a very distinctive astronomy technique called "star path navigation". The navigators determine the bow of the ship to the islands that are recognized by using the position of rising and setting of certain stars above the horizon. In the Majapahit era, compasses and magnets were used, and cartography (mapping science) was developed. In 1293 AD Raden Wijaya presented a map and census record to the Yuan Mongol invader, suggesting that mapmaking has been a formal part of governmental affairs in Java. The use of maps full of longitudinal and transverse lines, rhumb lines, and direct route lines traveled by ships were recorded by Europeans, to the point that the Portuguese considered the Javanese maps the best in the early 1500s.

When Afonso de Albuquerque conquered Malacca, the Portuguese recovered a chart from a Javanese maritime pilot, which already included part of the Americas. Regarding the chart Albuquerque said:

...a large map of a Javanese pilot, containing the Cape of Good Hope, Portugal and the land of Brazil, the Red Sea and the Sea of Persia, the Clove Islands, the navigation of the Chinese and the Gores, with their rhumbs and direct routes followed by the ships, and the hinterland, and how the kingdoms border on each other. It seems to me. Sir, that this was the best thing I have ever seen, and Your Highness will be very pleased to see it; it had the names in Javanese writing, but I had with me a Javanese who could read and write. I send this piece to Your Highness, which Francisco Rodrigues traced from the other, in which Your Highness can truly see where the Chinese and Gores come from, and the course your ships must take to the Clove Islands, and where the gold mines lie, and the islands of Java and Banda, of nutmeg and mace, and the land of the King of Siam, and also the end of the land of the navigation of the Chinese, the direction it takes, and how they do not navigate farther.
— Letter of Albuquerque to King Manuel I of Portugal, 1 April 1512.

A Portuguese account described how the Javanese people already had advanced seafaring skills and had communicated with Madagascar in 1645:

The Javanese are all men very experienced in the art of navigation, to the point that they claim to be the most ancient of all, although many others give this honor to the Chinese, and affirm that this art was handed on from them to the Javanese. But it is certain that they formerly navigated to the Cape of Good Hope and were in communication with the east coast of the island of São Lourenço (San Laurenzo — Madagascar), where there are many brown and Javanese-like natives who say they are descended from them.
— Diogo do Couto, Decada Quarta da Asia

Research in 2016 showed that the Malagasy people have genetic links to various Maritime Southeast Asian ethnic groups, particularly from southern Borneo. Parts of the Malagasy language are sourced from the Ma'anyan language with loan words from Sanskrit, with all the local linguistic modifications via Javanese or Malay language. The Ma'anyan and Dayak people are not a sailor and were dry-rice cultivators while some Malagasy are wet rice farmers, so it is likely that they are carried by the Javanese and Malay people in their trading fleets, as labor or slaves. Javanese trading and slaving activities in Africa caused a strong influence on boatbuilding on Madagascar and the East African coast. This is indicated by the existence of outriggers and oculi (eye ornament) on African boats.

== Description ==
Duarte Barbosa reported that the ships from Java, which they called Jungos, have four masts, are very different from Portuguese ships. A Javanese ship is made of very thick wood, and as it gets old, the Javanese fix it with new planks, this way they have 3–4 planks, one above the other. The rope and the sail are made with woven rattan. The Javanese junks were made using jati wood (teak) at the time of his report (1515), at that time Chinese junks were still using softwood as their main material. The Javanese ship's hull is formed by joining planks and keel with wooden dowels and treenails, without using iron bolts or nails. The frame would be built later, after the planking (the "shell first" construction). The planks are perforated by an auger and inserted with dowels, which remain inside the fastened planks, not seen from the outside. The hull was pointed at both ends, they carried two rudders and used tanja sail, but it may also use junk sail, a sail of Indonesian origin. On top of the mast there is a top or gávea, which is used for observation and fighting. They were very different from the Chinese ships, whose hulls were joined by iron nails and strakes to a frame and bulkheads. The Chinese vessel had a single rudder, and (except in Fujian and Guangdong) they had flat bottoms without keels.

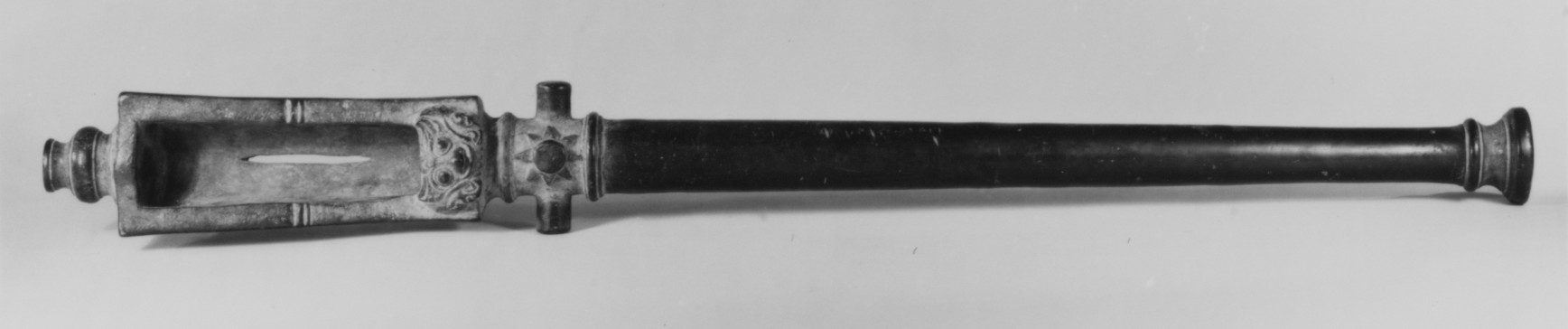
A bronze cannon, called a cetbang, Metropolitan Museum of Art, New York, from ca. 1470–1478 Majapahit; notice the Surya Majapahit emblem on the cannon

Historical engravings also depict the usage of bowsprits and bowsprit sails, with a deckhouse above the upper deck, and the appearance of stemposts and sternposts. The deckhouse is extending from the front to the back, where people are protected from the heat of the sun, rain, and dew. At the stern, there is a cabin for the ship's captain. This cabin, is square in shape and protruding ("hanging") above the sharp waterline stern (the sternpost), overhung above the water like a farmer's outhouse. The bow also has a square platform that protrudes above the stempost, for bowsprit and forward-facing gun shield/gun mount (apilan or ampilan in the Malay language). A jong could carry up to 100 berço (breech-loading artillery—likely refers to local cetbang cannon). Like other Austronesian ships, jong is steered using 2 quarter rudders. According to father Nicolau Perreira, the jong has 3 rudders, one on each side and one in the middle. This may refer to hybrid jong, with the middle rudder being like those on Chinese vessels (hanging axial rudder) or western axial rudder (pintle and gudgeon rudder). Alternatively, it may have been a long sweep to aid in harbor maneuvers. A jong has about 1:3 to 1:4 beam-to-length ratio, which makes it fall into the category of "round ship".

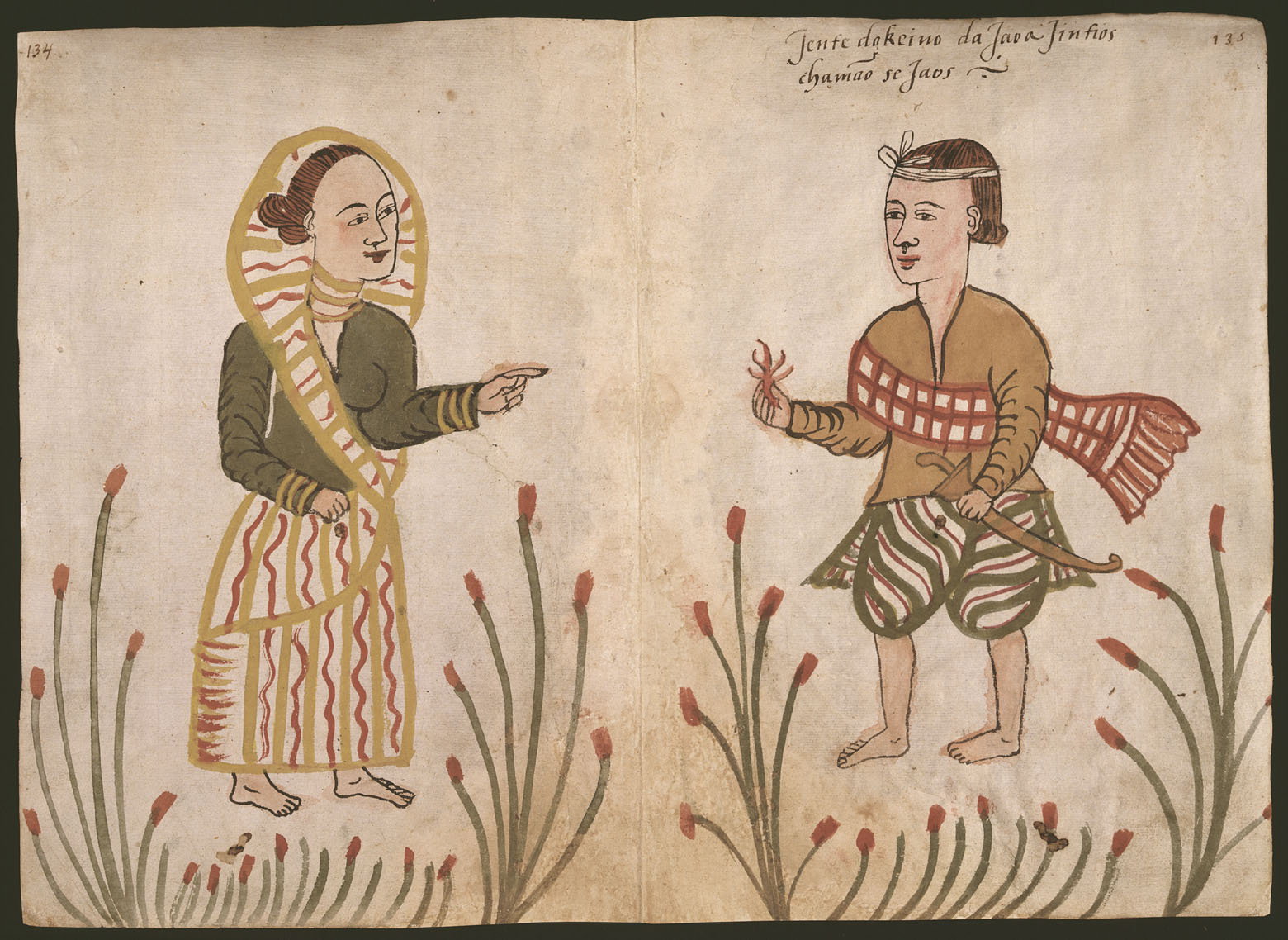
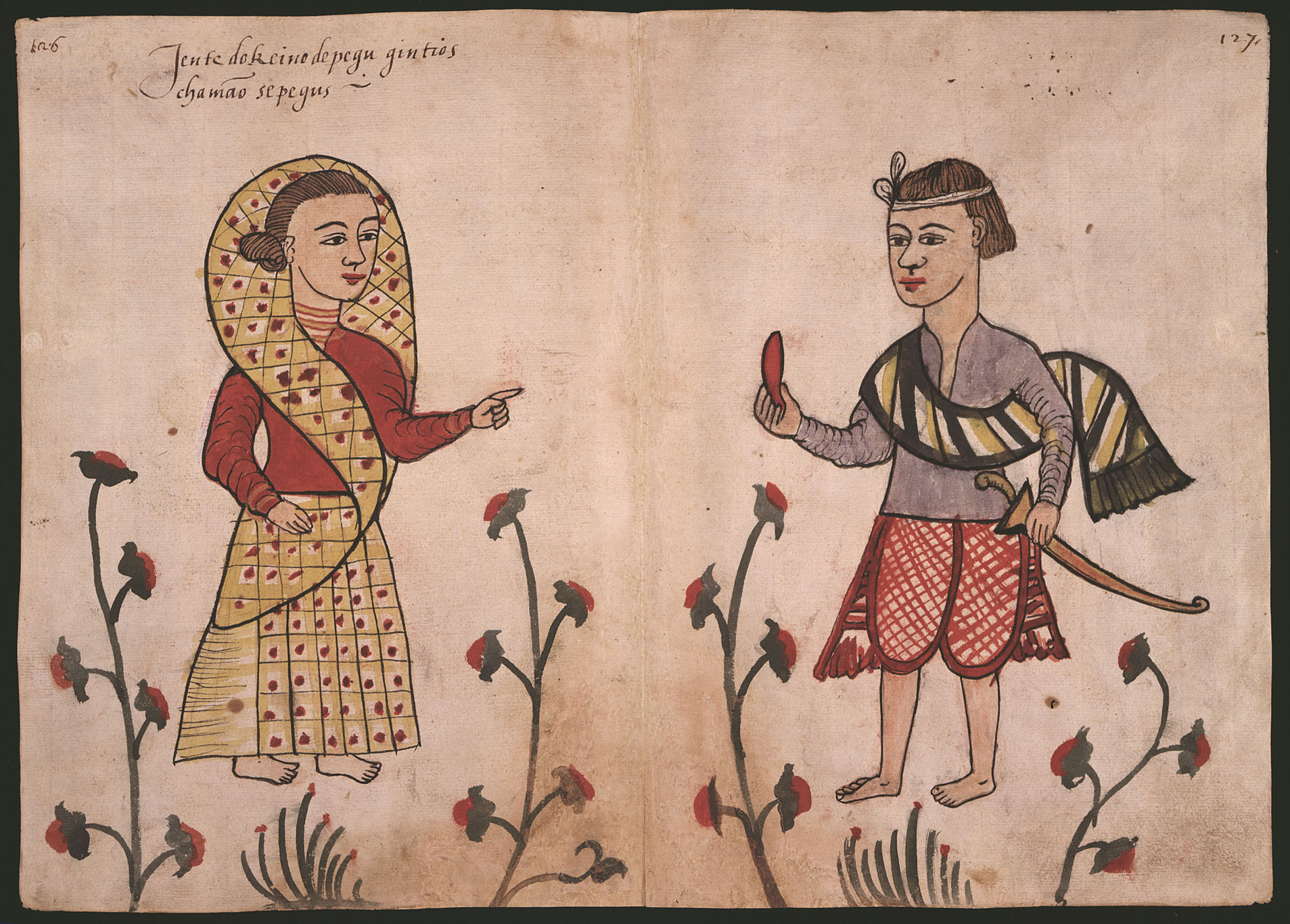
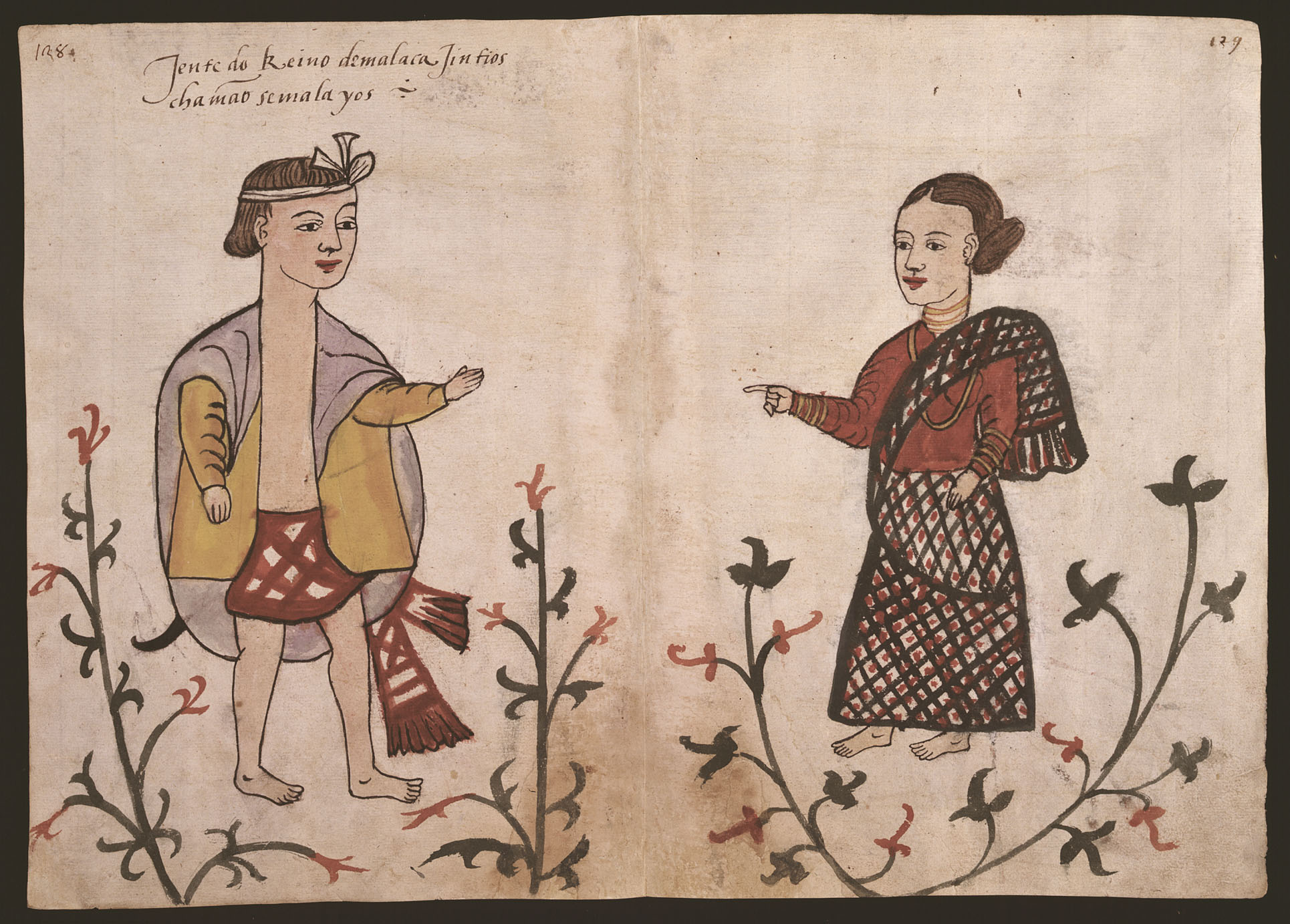
People who used jong in their voyages: from top to bottom are Javanese, Peguan, and Malay; depicted in Codex Casanatense of 1540 AD

Barbosa also reported various goods carried by these ships, which include rice, meat of cows, sheep, pigs, and deer, dried and salted, many chickens, garlic, and onions. Traded weapons include lances, dagger, and swords, worked in inlaid metal and very good steel. Also brought with them cubebs and yellow die called cazumba (kasumba) and gold which is produced in Java. Barbosa mention places and route in which these ships visited, which include Maluku Islands, Timor, Banda, Sumatra, Malacca, China, Tenasserim, Pegu (Bago), Bengal, Pulicat, Coromandel, Malabar, Cambay (Khambat), and Aden. From the notes of other authors, it is known that there were also those who went to the Maldives, Calicut (Kozhikode), Oman, Aden, and the Red Sea. The passenger brought their wives and children, even some of them never leave the ship to go on shore, nor have any other dwelling, for they are born and die in the ship. It is known that ships made with teak could last for 200 years.

The size and construction of the jong required expertise and materials that were not necessarily available in many places, therefore the Javanese junks were mainly constructed in two major shipbuilding centers around Java: north coastal Java, especially around Rembang–Demak (along the Muria strait) and Cirebon; and the south coast of Borneo (Banjarmasin) and adjacent islands; built by the Javanese. These places have teak forests, whose wood is resistant to shipworm. Southern Borneo's supply of teak would have come from north Java, whereas Borneo itself would supply ironwood. The Mon people of Pegu also produced jong using Burmese teak.

While the Malays of Malacca of the 16th century owned jongs, they were not built by the Malay people or by the Sultanate of Malacca. Malacca only produces small vessels, not large vessels. Large shipbuilding industry does not exist in Malacca — their industry is not capable producing deep-sea ships; only small, light, fast-sailing vessels. The people of Malacca purchased big ships (jong) from other parts of Southeast Asia, namely from Java and Pegu, they did not built them.

=== Difference from Chinese junks ===
The Chinese chuán (the "junk" in modern usage) and the Southeast Asian djong are frequently confused with each other and share some characteristics, including large cargo capacities, multiple (two to three) superimposed layers of hull planks, and multiple masts and sails. However the two are readily distinguishable from each other by two major differences. The first is that Southeast Asian (Austronesian) ships are built exclusively with lugs, dowels, and fiber lashings (lashed lug), in contrast to Chinese ships which are always built with iron nails and clamps. The second is that Chinese ships since the first century AD are all built with a central rudder. In contrast, Southeast Asian ships use double lateral rudders.

The development of the sea-going Chinese chuán in the Song Dynasty (c. 960 to 1279) is believed to have been influenced by regular contacts with sea-going Southeast Asian ships (the k'un-lun po of Chinese records) in trading ports in southern China from the 1st millennium CE onward, particularly in terms of the rigging, multiple sails, and the multiple hull sheaths. However, the chuán also incorporates distinctly Chinese innovations from their indigenous river and coastal vessels (namely watertight compartments and the central rudders). "Hybrid" ships (referred to as the "South China Sea tradition") integrating technologies from both the chuán and the djong also started to appear by the 15th century.

== History ==
=== Early eras ===
In the first millennium AD, the ship called kolandiaphonta was recorded in Claudius Ptolemaeus' Geography (ca. 150 AD). It is referred to by the Chinese as K'un-lun po. The characteristics of this ship are that it is large (more than 50–60 m long), the hull is made of multiple plankings, has no outrigger, mounted with many masts and sails, the sail is in the form of a tanja sail, and has a plank fastening technique in the form of stitching with plant fibers.

The 3rd century book Strange Things of the South (南州異物志 — Nánzhōu Yìwùzhì) by Wan Chen (萬震) describes ships capable of carrying 600–700 people together with more than 10,000 hu (斛) of cargo (250–1000 tons according to various interpretations—600 tons deadweight according to Manguin). These ships came from K'un-lun. The ships are called K'un-lun po (or K'un-lun bo), could be more than 50 meters in length and had a freeboard of 5.2–7.8 meters. (Note: In the original text, the length of the ship is listed as 20 chang or more and the freeboard 2–3 chang. Here 1 chang (or zhang) is taken as 2.6 meters.) When seen from above they resemble covered galleries. Wan Chen explains the ships' sail design as follows:

The people of foreign parts call ships po. The large ones are more than fifty meters in length and stand out of the water four to five meters (...) They carry from six to seven hundred persons, with 10,000 bushels of cargo. (Note: According to various interpretations, from 250 to 1000 tons) The people beyond the barriers, according to the size of their ships, sometimes rig (as many as) four sails which they carry in row from bow to stern. (...) The four sails do not face directly forward, but are set obliquely, and so arranged that they can all be fixed in the same direction, to receive the wind and to spill it. Those sails which are behind the most windward one receiving the pressure of the wind, throw it from one to the other, so that they all profit from its force. If it is violent, (the sailors) diminish or augment the surface of the sails according to the conditions. This oblique rig, which permits the sails to receive from one another the breath of the wind, obviates the anxiety attendant upon having high masts. Thus these ships sail without avoiding strong winds and dashing waves, by the aid of which they can make great speed.

— Wan Chen, Strange Things of the South

Faxian (Fa-Hsien) in his return journey to China from India (413–414) embarked on a ship carrying 200 passengers and sailors from K'un-lun which towed a smaller ship. A cyclone struck and forced the passengers to move into the smaller ship. The crew of the smaller ship feared that the ship would be overloaded, therefore they cut the rope and separated from the big ship. Luckily the bigger ship survived, and the passengers were stranded in Ye-po-ti (Yawadwipa—Java). After 5 months, the crew and the passengers embarked on another ship comparable in size to sail back to China.

The word "jong" itself was first recorded in the Old Javanese language from a Balinese inscription from the 11th century AD. The Sembiran A IV inscription (1065 AD) stated that merchants came to Manasa in Bali using jong and bahitra. The first record of jong in literature comes from Kakawin Bhomantaka, dated late 12th century AD.

=== Majapahit era ===
In 1322 friar Odoric of Pordenone recorded that during his voyage from India to China he boarded a vessel of the zuncum type which carried at least 700 people, either sailors or merchants.

Kidung Panji Wijayakrama-Rangga Lawe (compiled as early as 1334 AD) mentioned a nine-decked jong (jong sasangawangunan) during the war with the Mongols (1293 AD). It looked like a volcano because of its sparkling and flickering thundercloud decorations. Its sails were painted red. It carried 1000 people equipped with gandiwa (bow), bedil, shields, towok (javelin), kantar (long shield), and baju rantai (chainmail).

The Majapahit Empire used jongs as its main source of naval power. It is unknown how many exactly the total number of jongs were used by Majapahit, but the largest number of jongs deployed in an expedition was about 400, accompanied by uncountable malangbang and kelulus, when the Majapahit attacked Pasai. In the second largest military expedition, the invasion of Singapura in 1398, the Majapahit deployed 300 jongs with no fewer than 200,000 men (more than 600 men in each jong). Indonesian writer Pramoedya Ananta Toer argued that the largest Majapahit ships could carry 800–1000 men and were 50 depa (about 80–100 m) long. Modern calculation determined that the average jong used by Majapahit would be about 76.18–79.81 m LOA (69.26–72.55 m in deck length), carrying 600–700 men, with 1200–1400 tons deadweight and a displacement of 3333–3889 tons. The largest ones, carrying 1000 men, would be about 88.56 m LOA (80.51 m in deck length), with a deadweight of 2000 tons and a displacement of 5556 tons. A Balinese jong used by Bujangga Manik to travel from Bali to Blambangan was 8 depa (12.8–16 m) in width and 25 depa (40–50 m) in length. Among the smallest jong recorded, used by Chen Yanxiang to visit Korea, was 33-meter-long with an estimated capacity of 220 deadweight tons, with a crew of 121 people.

Prior to the Battle of Bubat in 1357, the Sunda king and the royal family arrived in Majapahit after sailing across the Java Sea in a fleet of 200 large ships and 2000 smaller vessels. The royal family boarded a nine-decked hybrid Sino-Southeast Asian junk (Old Javanese: Jong sasanga wangunan ring Tatarnagari tiniru). This hybrid junk incorporated Chinese techniques, such as using iron nails alongside wooden dowels, construction of watertight bulkheads, and the addition of a central rudder. There is an allusion in Nagarakretagama that ships and boats of Majapahit were painted red and black.

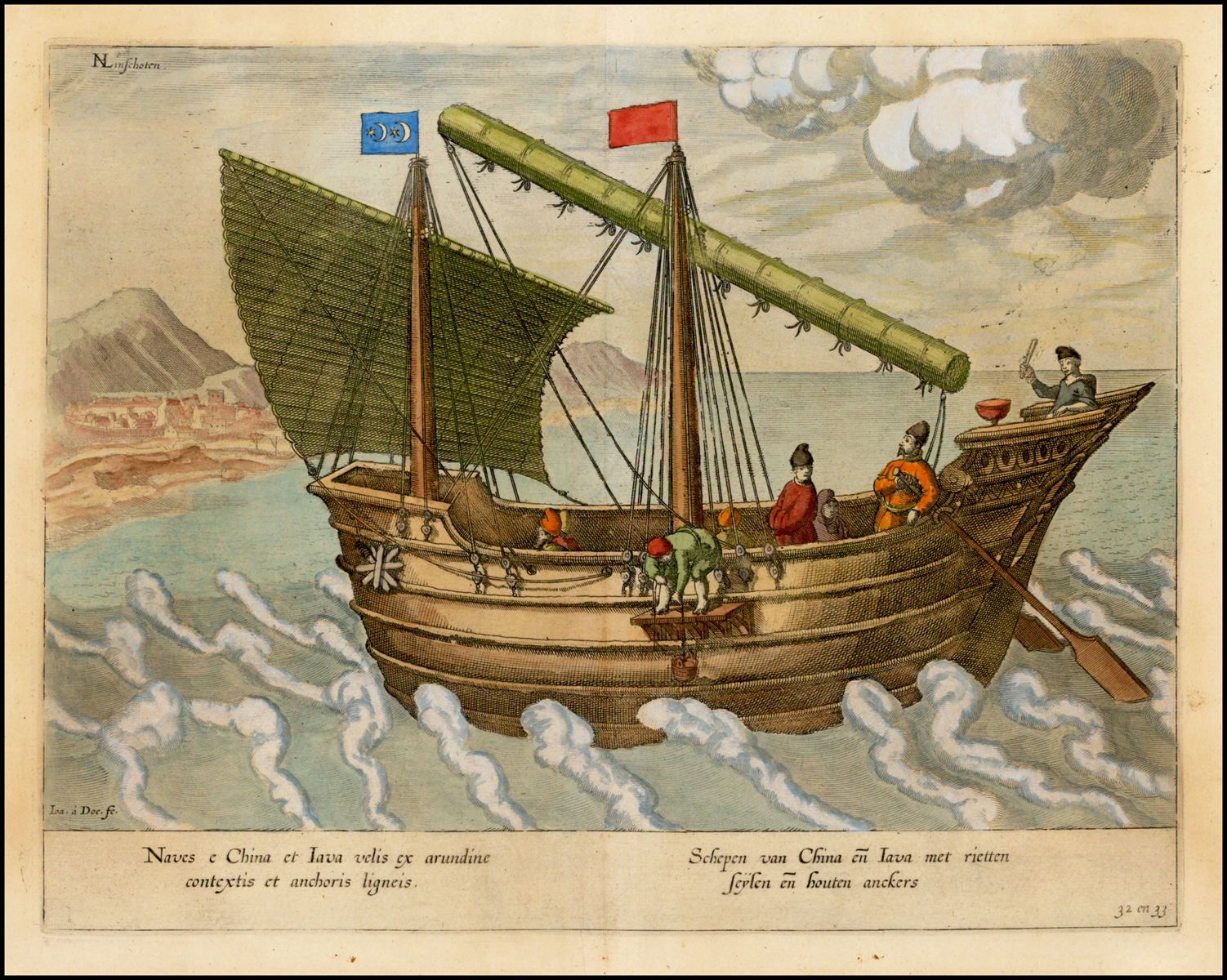
Hybrid Sino-Southeast Asian junk; the flag featuring crescent moons suggests that this junk hailed from one of the Islamic sultanates of Indonesia

Wang Dayuan's 1349 composition Daoyi Zhilüe Guangzheng Xia ("Description of the Barbarian of the Isles") described the so-called "horse boats" at a place called Gan-mai-li in Southeast Asia. These ships were bigger than normal trading ships, with the sides constructed from multiple planks. They used neither nails nor mortar to join them, but rather used coconut fiber. They had two or three decks, with a deckhouse over the upper deck. In the lower hold, they carried pressed-down frankincense; above them, several hundred horses were carried. Wang made special mention of these ships because pepper, which was also transported by them, was carried to faraway places in large quantities. The normal trading ships carried less than a tenth of their cargo.

Usually, the main vessel towed behind a smaller "tender" for landing. Data from Marco Polo records made it possible to calculate that the largest ships may have had a burden tonnage of 500–800 tons, about the same as Chinese vessels used to trade in the 19th century. The tender itself may have been able to carry about 70 tons. Marco Polo also noted that they may have 2 or 3 of these tenders, and may have about 10 small boats for helping the main vessel, such as for laying out anchors, catching fish, and bringing supplies aboard. When sailing, the small boats were slung to the ship's sides.

Niccolò da Conti, in relating his travels in Asia between 1419 and 1444, describes ships much larger than European ships, capable of reaching 2,000 tons in size, (Note: While Needham mentioned the size as 2000 tons, Major gives the size as 2000 butts (Major, R. H., ed. (1857), "The travels of Niccolo Conti", India in the Fifteenth Century, Hakluyt Society, p. 27), which would be around a 1000 tons, a butt being half a ton. See the definition of butt at https://gizmodo.com/butt-is-an-actual-unit-of-measurement-1622427091. Until the 17th century, ton referred to both the unit of weight and the unit of volume – see https://en.oxforddictionaries.com/definition/ton Archived 2019-03-29 at the Wayback Machine. A tun is 252 gallons, which weighs 2092 lbs, which is around a ton.) with five sails and as many masts. The lower part is constructed with three planks, to withstand the force of the tempests to which they are much exposed. Some of the ships are built in compartments so that if one part is punctured, the other portion remains intact to accomplish the voyage.

=== European age of discovery ===
Florentine merchant Giovanni da Empoli (1483–1517), one of the first Italian agents to join a Portuguese armada to India in 1503–1504, said that in the land of Java, a junk is no different in its strength than a castle, because it had three and four boards, one above the other, which cannot be harmed with artillery. They sail with their women, children, and family, and everyone has room for themselves.

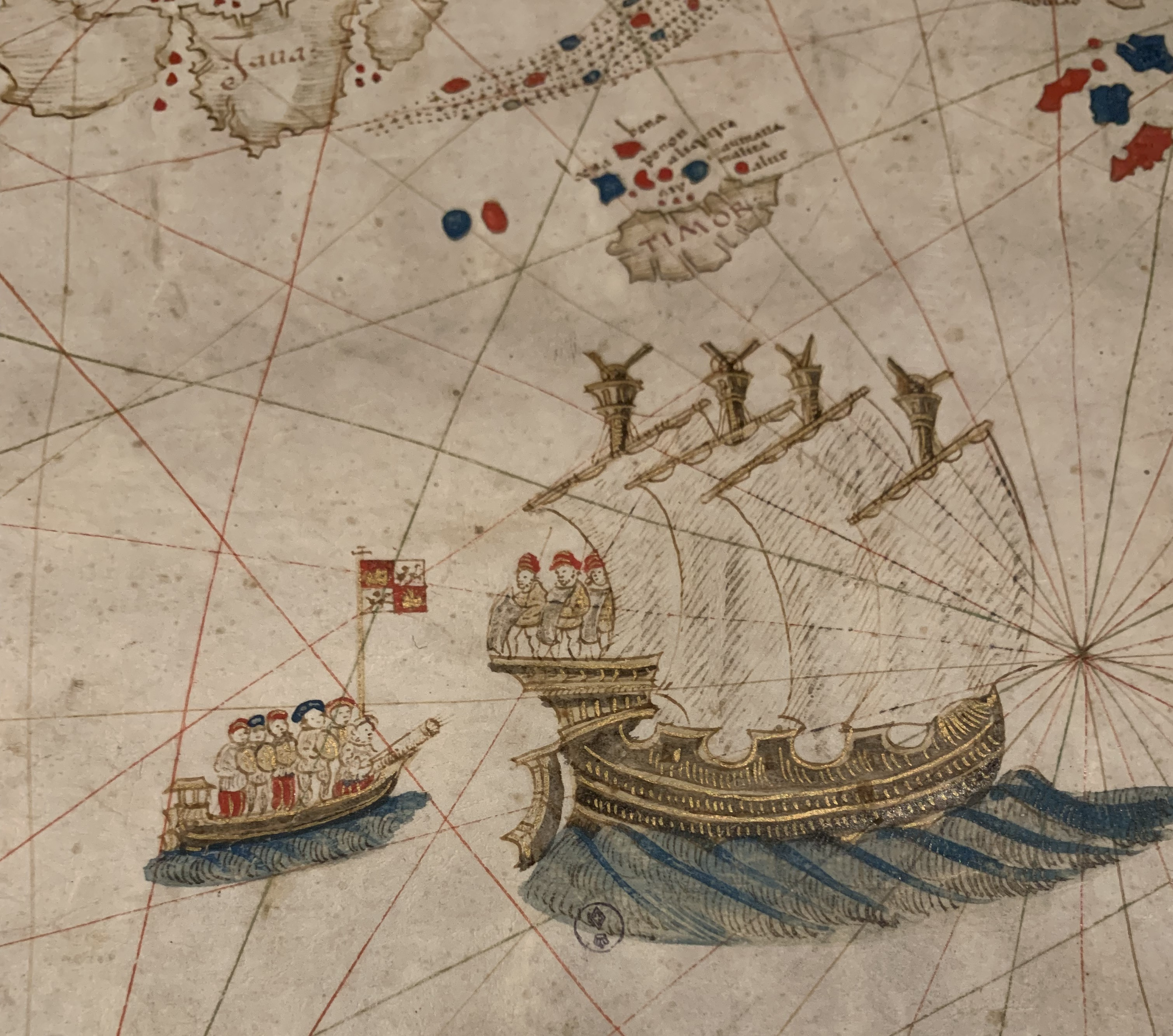
A four-masted ship being followed by a Portuguese vessel, in Nuño García de Toreno's map of 1522; this scene likely depicts a Javanese junk encountered near Polvoreira

Passing by Pacem (Samudera Pasai Sultanate) the Portuguese came across two junks. One was from Coromandel, which was captured immediately, and the other was from Java which weighed about 600 tons, near Polvoreira (likely Pulau Berhala, 160 miles from Malacca, between Belawan, Medan and Lumut, Perak). The junk carried 300 Javanese "Moors" (Muslims) on board. The Portuguese sent out small boats to approach it, and ordered it to halt but it promptly opened fire on the fleet, its crew hurling down spears, arrows, stones, gunpowder pots, and flammable materials. Afonso de Albuquerque approached it with his entire fleet.

The Portuguese began firing on the junk, but the cannonball bounced off the hull, and then the junk sailed away. The Portuguese ships then fired on the junk's masts causing them to fall. Near dawn, Flor de la Mar (the highest Portuguese carrack) caught up and rammed the junk, while firing artilleries which killed 40 of the junk's crew. The junk was so tall that Flor de la Mar's rear castle could barely reach its bridge, (Note: The bridge is the opening on the side of the ship for loading cargo, located lower than the upper deck. A more accurate terms for this are "gangplank", "brow", or "gangway".) and the Portuguese did not dare to board it. Their bombard shots did not damage it because it had 4 layers of board, while the largest Portuguese cannon could only penetrate no more than 2 layers. When the Portuguese tried to grapple it and attack in close combat, the crew set fire to their junk, (Note: The Javanese people have a custom of setting fire to their own ship when they perceive that they were overpowered and their ship would be captured.) forcing the Portuguese to pull away. During the escape, the junk's crew tried to put out the fire with great difficulty. (Note: The fire was created by burning olio da terra [an oil from the earth], found in great quantities near Pedir, where it flows forth from a fountain. The Muslims call this oil "Naptha" and doctors consider it remarkable and an excellent remedy for some illnesses. The Portuguese obtained some and found it very useful for treating coisas de frialdade e compressão dos nervios (low temperatures and nervous tension).)

After two days and two nights of fighting, Albuquerque decided to break the two rudders at the side of the vessel, causing it to surrender. Once aboard, the Portuguese found Prince Geinal (or Zeinal), the son of the king of Pasai who was deposed by his relative. Albuquerque hoped he could be made a vassal for trading. They also gained such an admiration for the junk and its crew and nicknamed it O Bravo (lit. "The Brave"). The Portuguese crew pleaded with Fernão Pires to convince Albuquerque that the crew should be spared and viewed vassals of Portugal who were simply unaware of who they were actually fighting. Albuquerque eventually agreed to this. (Note: Transcript from Gaspar Correia: "Because the junco started the attack, the Governor approached him with his entire fleet. The Portuguese ships began firing on the junco, but it had no effect at all. Then the junco sailed away ... The Portuguese ships then fired on the junco masts ... and the sails are falling. Because it's so tall, our people dare not board it, and our shots did not spoil it one bit because the junco has four layers of board. Our largest cannon was only able to penetrate no more than two layers ... Seeing that, the Governor ordered his nau (carrack) to move to the side of the junco. This ship is Flor de la Mar, the highest Portuguese ship. And while trying to climb the junco, the rear of the ship could barely reach its bridge. The junco's crew defended themselves so well that the Portuguese ships were forced to sail away from the ship again. (After two days and two nights of fighting) the Governor decides to break the two rudders at the side of the vessel. Only then did the junco surrender.")

In late 1512 – January 1513 Pati Unus of Demak Sultanate tried to surprise Malacca with 100 vessels with 5,000 Javanese from Jepara and Palembang. About 30 of those were junks weighing about 350–600 tons (except for Pati Unus' flagship), the rest being smaller boats of pangajava, lancaran, and kelulus types. The expedition may have carried up to 12,000 men. These vessels carried much Javanese artillery. (Note: According to Horst H. Liebner, most of the cannons were swivel guns, most likely of cetbang or rentaka type, a type of small and medium–sized cannon mounted on the gunwale. Larger fixed cannon of Malay ships usually mounted on the forward-facing apilan (gunshield).) Although defeated, Pati Unus sailed home and beached his armored war junk as a monument of a fight against men he called the bravest in the world, his exploit winning him a few years later the throne of Demak. In a letter to Afonso de Albuquerque, from Cannanore, 22 February 1513, Fernão Pires de Andrade, the captain of the fleet that routed Pati Unus, says:

The junk of Pati Unus is the largest seen by men of these parts so far. It carried a thousand fighting men on board, and your Lordship can believe me . . . that it was an amazing thing to see, because the Anunciada near it did not look like a ship at all. We attacked it with bombards, but even the shots of the largest did not pierce it below the water-line, and (the shots of) the esfera (Portuguese large cannon) (Note: The espera or esfera is a large Portuguese muzzle-loading cannon. It has a length of 2–5 meters with a weight of up to 1800 kg, usually used on caravels. The espera fires a 12–20 pound (5.44–9.1 kg) cannonball.) I had in my ship went in but did not pass through; it had three sheathings, all of which were over a cruzado thick. (Note: A kind of Portuguese coin with a diameter of 3.8 cm.) And it certainly was so monstrous that no man had ever seen the like. It took three years to build, as your Lordship may have heard tell in Malacca concerning this Pati Unus, who made this armada to become king of Malacca.
— Fernão Pires de Andrade

Fernão Lopes de Castanheda noted that Pati Unus' junk is built with 7 layers of planking, called lapis in Javanese and Malay, between each layer was put a coating consisting of a mixture of bitumen, lime, and oil. Pati Unus was using it as a floating fortress for blockading the area around Malacca.

The Portuguese remarked that such large, unwieldy ships were weaknesses. The Portuguese succeeded in repelling the attack using smaller but more maneuverable ships, using boarding tactics and setting fire to the junks. They did not specify the exact size of Pati Unus' junk. Irawan Djoko Nugroho suggested that it has a length of 4–5 times the Flor do Mar (a nau). This would make its size about 144–180 m, with the tonnage between 1600 and 2000 tons. (Note: In his book, Nugroho thought that Flor do Mar was about 78.3 m long, which would have made Pati Unus' junk gigantic as 313.2–391.5 m long. In this case, he used the length of Adler von Lübeck (1566) for Flor do Mar's length. The length figure represented before the citation is calculated using the size of Flor do Mar replica's in Malacca Maritime museum, which is 36 m long.) Pierre-Yves Manguin put it as low as 1000 tons. Muhammad Averoes calculated the size by determining its displacement first, and obtained that the Pati Unus' junk has a displacement tonnage of 5556 tons and deadweight of 2000 tons, with an LOA of 88.56 m and LOD of 80.51 m.

Impressed by the Javanese's skill in shipbuilding, Albuquerque hired 60 Javanese carpenters and shipbuilders from the Malacca shipyard and sent them to India, with the hope that these craftsmen will be able to repair Portuguese ships in India. But they never arrived in India, they rebelled and took the Portuguese ship they boarded to Pasai, where they were welcomed extraordinarily. The Portuguese employed junks in big numbers for their trade in Asia. At least 1 jong was sailed to Portugal, to be deployed as a coast guard ship at Sacavem under the instruction of King John III, (Note: From a letter from king João III to Conde da Castanheira, dated 22 August 1536: "Pareceo me bem mandardes a Sacavem pelo galleam Trimdade e pelo junco" (It seems to me that you did right in ordering the deployment of the galleon Trimdade and the jong, which were at Sacavem).) and as a warship in the Gibraltar Strait Fleet, the Esquadra do Estreito.

Tomé Pires in 1515 wrote that the authorities of Canton (Guangzhou) made a law that obliged foreign ships to anchor at an island off-shore. He said that the Chinese made this law about banning ships from Canton for fear of the Javanese and Malays, for it was believed that one of their junks would rout 20 Chinese junks. China had more than a thousand junks, but one ship of 400 tons could depopulate Canton, and this depopulation would bring great loss to China. The Chinese feared that the city would be taken from them, because Canton was one of China's wealthiest city.

In 1574, queen Kalinyamat of Jepara Sultanate attacked the Portuguese Malacca with 300 vessels under the command of Kyai Demang, which included 80 jongs weighing up to 400 tons burthen and 220 kelulus, although with very little artillery and firearms. As the supplies were dwindling and the air corrupted by disease, Tristão Vaz da Veiga decided to arm a small fleet of a galley and four half-galleys and about 100 soldiers and head out to the River of Malaios, in the middle of the night. Once there, the Portuguese fleet entered the river undetected by the Javanese crews, and resorting to hand-thrown fire bombs set fire to about 30 junks and other crafts, catching the enemy fleet entirely by surprise, and capturing ample supplies amidst the panicking Javanese. After a 3-month siege, the Javanese retreated.

Recounting his 10 years in the East Indies (1601–1611), François Pyrard of Raval (ca. 1578–1623) mentioned a wreck of a Sundanese junk in Guradu, South Malé Atoll, Maldives. The ship was carrying all kinds of spices and other merchandise from China and Sunda. On board were about 500 men, women, and children, and only 100 were saved during its sinking. The king of Maldives asserted that it was the richest ship conceivable. Pyrard thought it was the largest ship he has ever seen, with the mast being taller and thicker than those of Portuguese carracks, and the top was much larger than those of Portugal. The Sundanese queen's parents were the owner of the junk, both were drowned in the sinking. The queen, which was only a child during the sinking, survived. Pyrard believed that in Indonesia, there were built ships larger and of better material than in Portugal or any other place in the world.

The Dutch in the late 16th and early 17th centuries found that the Javanese jongs sailing in Southeast Asia were smaller than in previous centuries. Willem Lodewycksz noted that Bantenese junk had a capacity of not more than 20 last (40 tons). Willem Lodewycksz's report on one of the jongs he saw in Banten in 1596 reads:

(Seated at the stern) were two men steering: Because (the ship) had two rudders, one on each side, and a pole in the middle which is tied to the ship with ropes under the stern (...). (These jongs) are their ships which they use to navigate the open seas to Maluku, Banda, Borneo, Sumatra, and Malacca. They have a bowsprit on the front, and near it a front mast, (and there is also) a mainmast and a mizzenmast, and from front to the back there is a structure like a house, on which they sit protected from the heat of the sun, rain, and dew. At the stern there is a room that is only for the ship captain, they have no square sail except for the bowsprit sail, under it (inside the hull) is divided into small spaces where they store the cargo. They enter through the openings on either side of the ship and this is where their fireplace/chimney is located.

The first jong encountered by the Dutch in Banten was only 16 last (32 tons) in size. The jong of Banten is mostly made in Banjarmasin, Borneo. But it's certain that Lodewycksz never saw the leviathans of Central Java, such as those from Semarang and Jepara. In December 1664, Wouter Schouten described the great jong of Java:

They build large ships commonly called joncken (jong), which by the Javanese are used more for commerce than for warfare, some are so large that they could carry 200–300 last (400–600 tons). These are equipped with a bowsprit, foresail mast, large mast, and mizzen; but they don't have topmasts, no mars (top) (Note: Correia mentioned gauea (gávea) while Pyrard mentioned "top". Schouten was probably describing the large top like those of Dutch ships, which is used for structural connection between the upper and lower mast. Witsen says: "As for the tops (mars) they are to hold the masts steady, for which the shrouds are fastened to it at either side; and also to provide room for the seamen, on which to stand, when they have something to do up there".) nor upper sails like ours but large square lower sails made of straw or coconut bark. The upper deck of these jongs stays unusually high when the cargo is placed under the body storage. The shipmates are divided over multiple small rooms and chambers; the stern hangs like a farmer's outhouse miraculously sticking out very far over the water; you can also find a cabin for the captain there or the supercargo who is responsible for the handling of business. Because the Chinese and the Javanese depart on journeys with these jong and other types of ships for some weeks or months they usually take their wives and children with them. This means they learn the discomfort of a sailor's life from a young age.

== Decline ==
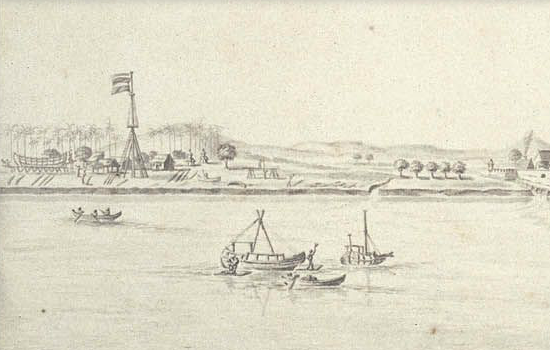
Shipyard in Rembang, ca. 1772

Anthony Reid argues that the failure of the jong in battles against smaller and more agile Western ships may have convinced the Javanese shipbuilders that the large but less agile jong faced too much risk against the European style of naval battle, so the ships they built later were smaller and faster. Since the mid-16th century the maritime forces of the archipelago began to use new types of agile naval vessels that could be equipped with larger cannons: In various attacks on Portuguese Malacca after the defeat of Pati Unus, they no longer used jong but used lancaran, ghurab, and ghali. The jongs that plied the archipelago post-1600s were ranging from 20 to 200 tons deadweight, with a possible average of 100 tons, but there are still several of them that could load 200–300 lasts (about 360–400 to 540–600 metric tons) (Note: A last was originally a unit of freight volume, subsequently a unit of weight, varying according to the nature of the freight, equalling roughly between 1.8 and 2 metric tons.) in the early 1700s.

Production of djongs ended in the 1700s, perhaps because of the decision of Amangkurat I of Mataram Sultanate to destroy ships in coastal cities and close ports to prevent them from rebelling, in 1655. By 1677, the Batavia Daghregister reported that Mataram is lacking vessels on their own even for necessary use, and was very ignorant about the sea. After the 1700s, the role of the jong has been replaced by European types of ships, namely the bark and brigantine, built at local shipyards of Rembang and Juwana (the former shipbuilding place for jong), such ships may reach 400–600 tons burthen, with the average of 92 lasts (165.6–184 metric tons). The Dutch also realized Javanese proficiency in shipbuilding: In the 18th century, shipbuilding yards in Amsterdam employed Javanese people as foremen. In 1856, John Crawfurd noted that Javanese shipbuilding activity still existed on the north coast of Java, with the shipyards supervised by Europeans, but all of the workers were Javanese. The ships that were built in the 19th century had a maximum tonnage of 50 tons and were mainly used for river transport.

== Replica ==
A small-sized replica is moored along the Marine March of Resorts World Sentosa, Singapore.

== In popular culture ==
Jong is an Indonesian unique unit in Sid Meier's Civilization VI video game. However, the model used in-game more closely resembles a Borobudur ship than an actual jong.

== See also ==
- List of longest wooden ships
- Ghurab, another large trading ship of Nusantara
- Chinese treasure ship
- Borobudur ship
- Geobukseon/turtle ship
- Atakebune
