= Kakap (boat) =

Narrow coastal boat used in Malaysia, Indonesia, and Brunei

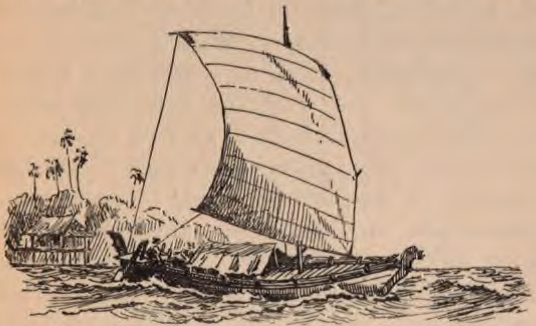
Kakap Jeram, fishing boat of Selangor.

A kakap is a narrow river or coastal boat used for fishing in Malaysia, Indonesia, and Brunei. They are also sometimes used as auxiliary vessels to larger warships for piracy and coastal raids.

== Etymology ==
The name "kakap" comes from Malay word meaning "spy", "scout", "lookout". Thus, the name means "type of boat used for scouting".

== Description ==
Kakap resemble pangajava but are smaller and lighter. It also uses a mast and rectangular tanja sail. The boards and planks on the hull are not nailed with iron nail, but are attached using a wooden dowel technique and reinforced with rattan bonds. Larger kakaps may reach eight meters in length and able to carry 8–10 crews.

The kakap jeram's hull is planked and built with frames, made by meranti (dipterocarp) wood. It has carved figurehead and ornamented sternpost. A washstrake made of bamboo splits sewn together with bamboo withies, and held in position by lashings. A heavy beam is fitted forward and used for winding the anchor cable and bitting it. The steering gear consist of a paddle held on the quarter on a stout upright and held at the neck by a rattan lashing.

It has 1 mast with junk sail. Average length of mast is 13 ft (4 m). The length of a kakap jeram is about 13 ft (4 m), the width is 7 ft (2.1 m), with 3 ft (91 cm) depth. It has a freeboard of 1 ft (30 cm) and crew of 3 men.

== Role ==
In Selangor coast, the kakap is used as a fishing boat, under the name of kakap Jeram. Jeram is the name of a big fishing village in the Kuala Selangor district. Its name can be interpreted as "Jeram scouter".

For piracy activities, the kakap does not sail alone but often accompanies a penjajap and is used as an observer in piracy activities. If a merchant ship encounters such a boat, a penjajap or lanong must be hiding in the nearby waters. A kakap is also suitable for going along the beach and sailing to the river estuary. If attacked, a kakap can land easily on the beach or river bank to make it easier for the crew to escape to the mangrove or palm forest area while carrying the boat with them. Sea people use a kakap that can contain 20 people for piracy activities at sea.

== See also ==
- Penjajap
- Salisipan
- Kelulus
- Junk (ship)
- Pinisi
- Kora-kora
