= Malangbang =

Indonesian medieval sailing ship

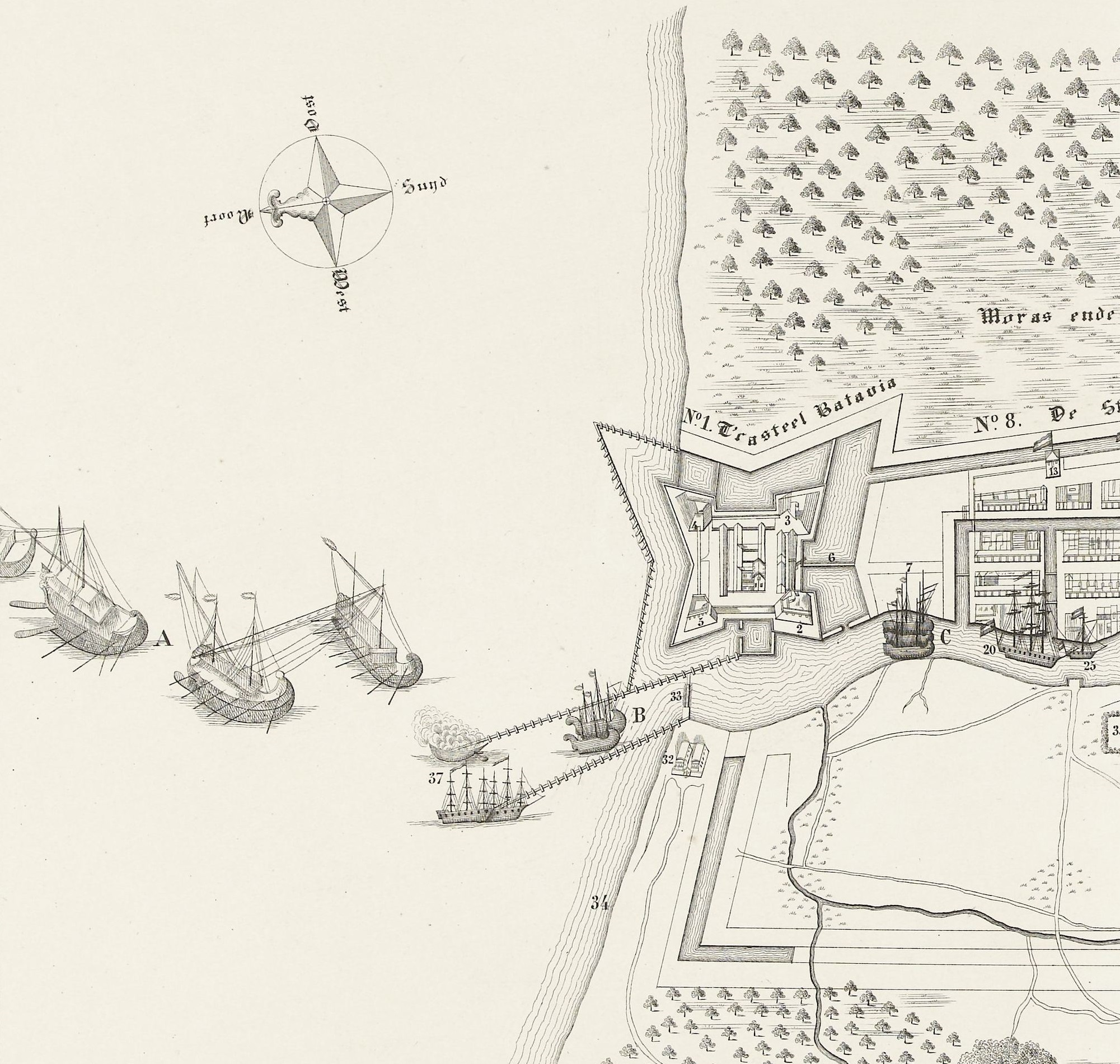
Javanese ships at the 1628 siege of Batavia. Compare the size with the moored East Indiaman.

Malangbang or melambang is a type of medieval sailing ship from Indonesia. It is mentioned mainly in the History of Banjar. The name "malangbang" is considered to originate from the Old Javanese language, malabong (malaboṅ) which refers to a particular type of boat. Malangbang was one of Majapahit's main naval vessel types after jong and kelulus. Not much is known about this type of ship, apart from the fact that it also used oars beside the sails to propel it, broad and flat-bottomed, and was a "medium-sized" ship, between the size of jong and kelulus, larger and faster than pilang (pelang).

Lambu Mangkurat, the king of Kuripan used a malangbang named Si Prabayaksa to travel to Majapahit. Quote from the Chronicle of Banjar:

He sailed in full state on board the yacht (original: malangbang) called Prabayaksa, availing himself of the insignia of royalty left by his father Ampu Jatmaka: two vertical streamers adorned with gold, two tasseled staves adorned with gold, four pennons decorated with gold paint, a braided streamer looking like a centipede embroidered with gold thread and twenty pikes with tufts of red feathers adorned with spangles of gold; his lances had biring blades inlaid with gold, their shafts where decorated with dark-red and gold paint, not to mention two state sunshades decorated with gold paint, two state lances shaped like frangipani buds, inlaid with gold and with their shafts banded with gold. The yacht was adorned with marquetry of gold; its sails were of the finest cloth; the clew-lines, the stays and the sheets were of silk and had tassels of pearls; the rudder was of timbaga suasa (a copper and gold alloy), the oars of iron-wood with bands of gold and the anchor gear of undamascened steel. The ships sailing behind her were also fully dressed.

== See also ==
- Benawa
- Palari (boat)
- Padewakang
- Kelulus
- Penjajap
- Sandeq
