= Kelulus =

Indonesian rowing boat

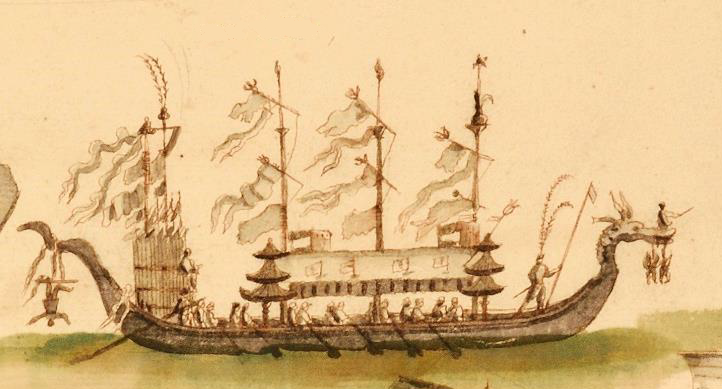
Kelulus as depicted in La Marina de Oriente (1740).

Kelulus or kalulus is a type of rowing boat used in the Nusantara archipelago. It is typically small in size and propelled using oar or paddle. However, for long-distance voyages, this boat can be equipped with sails. It is not the same as prahu kalulis of the eastern part of the Indonesian archipelago.

== Etymology ==
The name kelulus seems to be derived from Javanese word "lulus", which means "to go right through anything". According to Hobson-Jobson, the literal translation would be "the threader".

== Description ==
The earliest report of kelulus is from Hikayat Raja-Raja Pasai (Chronicle of the Kings of Pasai) of the 14th century, in which they are mentioned as one type of vessel used by the Majapahit empire. Although they are not well described, kelulus is one of Majapahit's main vessel types after jong and malangbang.

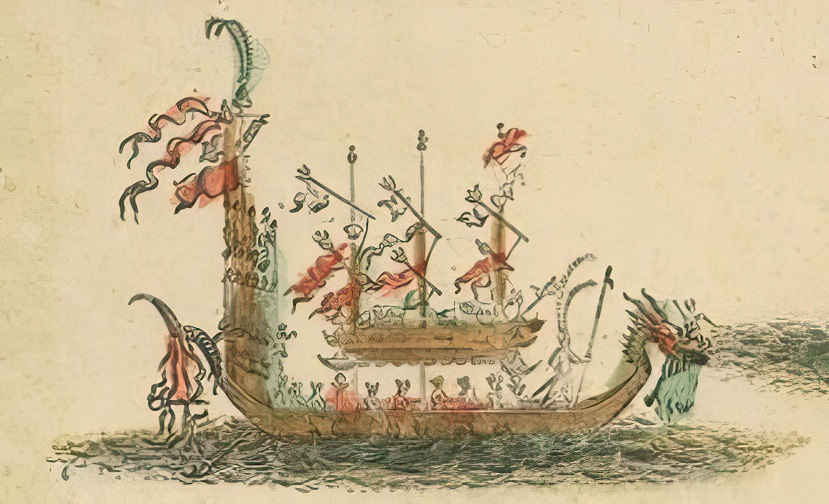
Kelulus in Batavia (now Jakarta), 1733.

From Portuguese sources, they are transcribed as calaluz (calaluzes for plural form), whereby they are described as "A kind of swift rowing vessel used in the Maritime Southeast Asia".

In about 1500 CE, the Sultanate of Malacca opposed Siam with 200 boats, consisting of lancaran and kelulus. After Sultan Mahmud Shah of Malacca was deposed from Malacca in 1511, he took over Bintan. In 1519 and 1520 he had a fleet consisting of 60 and 100 boats respectively, both being made up of lancaran and kelulus.

Tome Pires in 1513 reported that the pates (dukes) of Java has many calaluz for raiding, and described:

... but they are not fit to go out of the shelter of the land. Kelulus were specialty of Java. They are carved in a thousand and one ways, with figures of serpents, and gilt; they are ornamental. Each of them has many of these, and they are very much painted, and they certainly look well and are made in a very elegant way, and they are for kings to amuse themselves in, away from the common people. They are rowed with paddles.

... They go out in triumphal cars, and if they go by sea [they go] in painted calaluzes, so clean and ornamental, with so many canopies that the rowers are not seen by the lord;

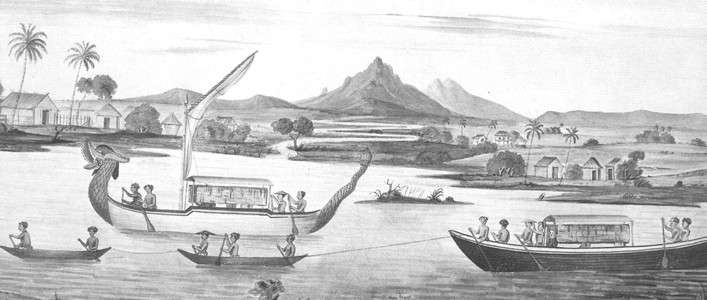
Royal barge in the Bengawan Solo River, near Gresik, ca. 1811–1813.

In 1537, Javanese kelulus encountered in Patani was described as having two rows of oars: One was of short paddles, the other was "like a galley" (long oars); they carried 100 soldiers, with much artillery and firearms. Gonçalo de Souza reported that they have 27 oars and carried 20 soldiers. They are armed with swivel guns (falconselhos) at the bow and stern.

Spanish dictionary lists them as "Small boat used in the East Indies".

Portuguese historian António Galvão in 1544 made a treatise about Maluku, which lists the types of boats from the region, including the kalulus. He described the hull as being egg shaped at the middle but sloping upwards at both ends. At the prow they are shaped like high snake neck with the head of a serpent and the horns of a deer.

== Usage ==
Kelulus were used as transport vessel or war boat. Majapahit overseas invasion used kelulus, usually in uncountable numbers. The pati of Java had many war kelulus for raiding coastal villages. During the Demak Sultanate attack on Portuguese Malacca of 1512–1513, kelulus were used as armed troop transports for landing alongside penjajap and lancaran, as the Javanese junks were too large to approach shore.

Queen Kalinyamat of Jepara attacked Portuguese Malacca in 1574 with 300 vessels, 220 of which are calaluzes and the rest were jongs weighing up to 400 tons burthen. The attack ended in failure for the Javanese.

In 1600, king Chiay Masiuro (or Chiaymasiouro) of Demak embarked in a calelus from Blambangan which has been equipped with oar and sail, to the south. After 12 days, he arrived at Luca Antara or Java Major, which is believed to be Australia. There he received by the syahbandar, and stayed for several days. Chiaymasiuro found out that the inhabitants were Javanese, but with mixed culture of Java, Sunda, and Bali. After he returned to Blambangan, the news of the voyage made great astonishment and public notoriety in Java.

== See also ==
- Salisipan, a rowing boat from the Philippines
- Tomako
- Waka taua
- Penjajap
- Djong
- Lancaran (ship)
- Kora-kora
- Javanese contact with Australia
