= Penjajap =

Fast rowing and sailing boat from Southeast Asia

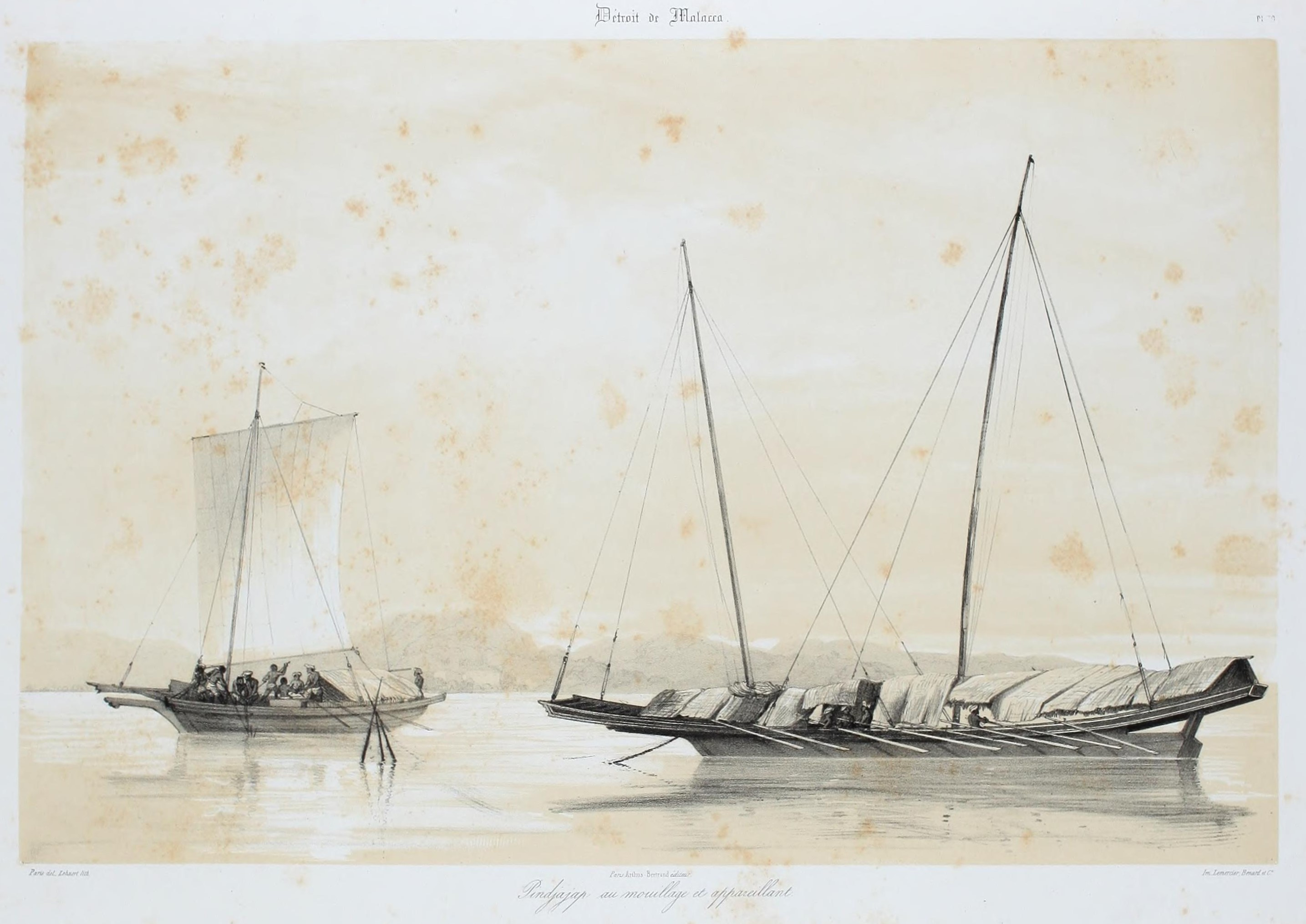
A pindjajap at the strait of Malacca

Penjajap, also pangajava and pangayaw, were native galley-like warships used by several Austronesian ethnic groups in maritime Southeast Asia. They were typically very long and narrow, and were very fast. They are mentioned as being used by native fleets in Indonesia, the southern Philippines, Malaysia, and Brunei.

== Names and etymology ==
The original name for the ships among the natives of the Maluku Islands, eastern Sabah, western Mindanao, and the Sulu Archipelago is pangayaw or mangayaw (literally meaning "raider"). This was transcribed in European sources (chiefly Dutch and Portuguese) variously as pangaio, pangaia, panguaye, pangajao, pangajaua, pangajava, penjajab, penjajap, pindjajap, penjelajah, and pangara. The British East India Company explorer Thomas Forrest also records that the Iranun called them mangaio.

The terms (particularly pangaio) were also later borrowed and used generically for any native wooden sailing ships made from planks without using nails by the Portuguese Empire in their colonies in Africa and India. This usage later spread to other European colonial powers, being applied chiefly to Arab and Swahili-built ships. The terms are similarly inaccurately applied to the garay, fast raiding vessels of the Banguingui and Iranun people in the Philippines. However, the garay were much broader and did not have outriggers.

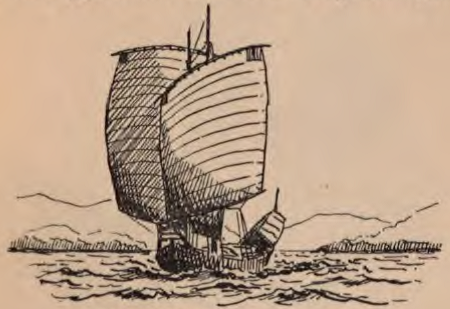
A front view of a penjajap, with sails spread like goosewing (running downwind/receiving wind from aft).

Penjajap may also be generically referred to as prao, prahu, proe, prauw, or prow in historical records. The "List of Ships and Sea Vehicles from East Indies" which is periodically published by colonial government of Dutch East Indies, registered pangajaoa as pengajoehan (pengayuhan). The list records its name came from kajoeh (kayuh—means paddle) and pengajoeh (pengayuh—means paddler), and consider it as a kind of galley.

In modern Malay military literature, penjajap refers to modern cruiser classes, although English loanword "kruiser" might be used.

== History ==
The earliest record of penjajap is from 1509 by the Portuguese historian Fernão Lopes de Castanheda, he said that pangajava (penjajap) were vessels from Sumatra, long and swift, going very well under sail or oars.

According to Afonso de Albuquerque, during the 1511 Portuguese attack on the Malacca Sultanate, the Malays used an unspecified number of lancaran (lanchara) and twenty penjajap (pangajaoa).

In 1775, the British explorer Thomas Forrest described a large penjajap in an Iranun harbor in Sulu as being only 4 ft (1.2 m) wide and 3.5 ft (1.1 m) deep, but was as long as 42 ft (13 m). It mounted six brass lantaka and carried a crew of thirty men, and was equipped with outriggers.

Admiral François-Edmond Pâris observed penjajaps during his voyage aboard the ship Favorite. The dimensions of the vessels encountered vary widely, the largest he saw were 17 m (56 ft) long, 3.4 m (11.2 ft) wide and 2.1 m (6.9 ft) deep; the smallest was 11 m (36 ft) long.

Herbert Warington Smyth reported the description of penjajap from Malay peninsula at the end of the 19th century. The boats were using dipping lugsail, with small deckhouse or awning (called kajang in Malay) and overhanging stern gallery (called dandan).

== Description ==
A penjajap sailing off the coast of Patani.

Penjajap were made from light materials. They were typically very long and narrow and had a shallow draft. This allowed them to sail over dangerous reefs as well as upriver. Large penjajap had outriggers, without which, they would capsize. Penjajap has sharp stern but with an overhanging gallery. Deckhouse amidships is made of palm leaves with thatched roof. In the 19th century they are steered using centerline rudder of western design, but early penjajap may have used double quarter rudder. They have 1, 2, or 3 masts depending on the size, the quadrilateral sail has yard and boom. Long narrow oars are also used for propulsion. The name "Pagar Tenggalong" refers to a type of penjajap with ornamental bulwark/rail.

Penjajap carried 1 or 2 guns of larger caliber in the wooden gunshield (apilan). Small penjajap only carried 1–2 lantaka supported on posts at the bow, while larger ones had additional swivel guns mounted at the sides. They were propelled by oars and usually by two tanja sails (called saguran among Sulu pirates). They could be rowed both forwards and backwards. They had a relatively open deck covered by a platform. A small cabin is located at the back, which served as the quarters of the nakodah and as a magazine for arms.

Like the larger and broader garay, they also served as motherships to smaller kakap war-boats. Penjajap were very fast. Large penjajap could reach speeds of 9 knots (17 km/h) under sail, and 5 knots (9.3 km/h) when rowed. In Iranun raiding fleets, they usually outpaced the slower lanong warships.}

== Role ==
A penjajap sailed into Singora. The Malay projecting aft-gallery (dandan) can be seen.

Penjajap were chiefly used as inter-insular warships and as pirate ships. Iranun penjajap were usually lightly armed compared to the lanong. Usually they only mount a single lela (native cannon). While lanong was specially designed for ship-to-ship combat, penjajap is more suited to raid coastal villages and attack lightly armed or unarmed merchant ships. In such raids, penjajap were usually accompanied by smaller boats called kakap, which are used as scouts for the penjajap or lanong.

The Portuguese diplomat Tomé Pires, on his visit to Nusantara, referred the penjajap as cargo vessels. Many cargo penjajap were collected by Pati Unus from various port cities in Java to attack the Portuguese in Malacca. Penjajap were converted to serve as armed troop transports for landing, as the Javanese junks were too large to approach shore. Penjajap was the other type of vessels counted by Pires after junks and lancaran upon arriving at a port. However Pires said that after the boats were donated to Pati Unus, trading activity in the ports became more lethargic.

Admiral François-Edmond Pâris noted several cargo penjajap in Malacca strait during 1830s. The penjajap brought spices, dried areca nuts, and coconut almonds from Sumatra, and seem to frequent only the southern part of the strait.

== See also ==
- Lancaran
- Kora kora
- Padewakang
- Kelulus
