= Miniature meriam kecil =

Small version of meriam kecil

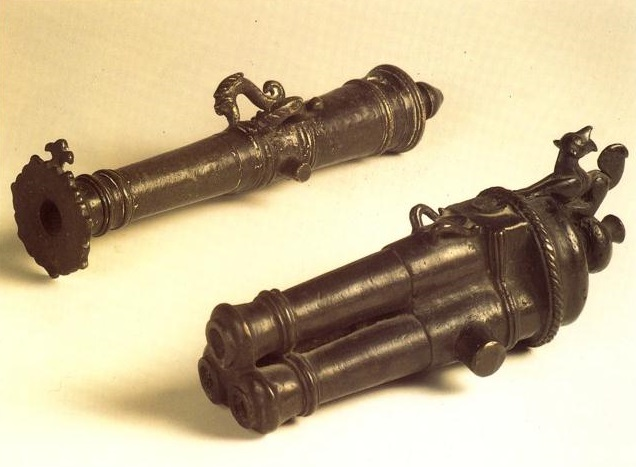
Two cannons used for currency in Southeast Asia. One barrelled cannon is from Malacca or Indonesia area, 22–24 cm (8.7–9.4 in) long, ca. 1700s. The three barrelled cannon is from Siam, 1600s-1700s, worth triple the value of the former, 24 cm (9.4 in) long. Both are functional.

Miniature meriam kecil (also known as currency cannon) is a type of very small cannon found on the Indonesian archipelago. Usually the length of these cannons is between 10–60 cm (3.9–23.6 in), with a caliber of 15 mm (0.59 in) or 16 mm (0.63 in), and has been around for hundreds of years. They are designed and decorated like a normal sized meriam kecil (lela or rentaka).

== Description ==
Miniature meriam kecil are shaped like the larger cannon, but may have unusual shapes. Some of them are in the form of buffalos, or crocodiles. They can be single or double barreled.

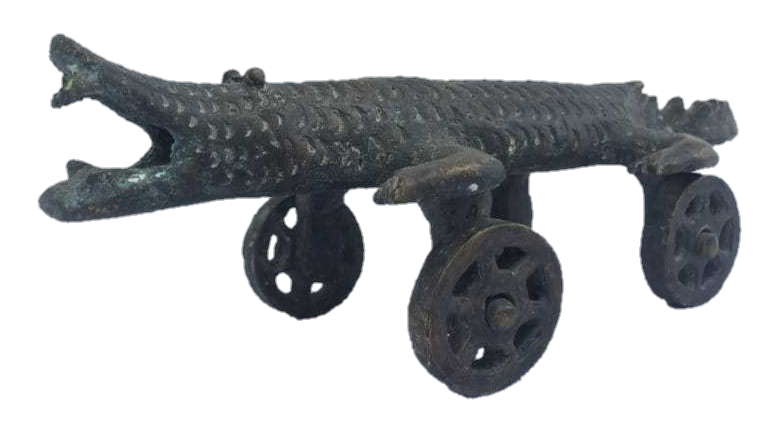
Miniature lantaka buaya (crocodile-shaped lantaka), 33 cm long.

In Borneo, miniature meriam kecil are more varied in design. With hundreds of years of trade influence with China, India, and the Middle East coupled with local design preferences, there are many artistic models of Bornean meriam kecil. Because cannon plays a large role in the traditional lives of the natives of Borneo, the intricate decorations of the barrel and the elaborate details of its designs and engravings give the impression that they also have spiritual and magical uses. Many types of Bornean cannon and brass wares are displayed in the Brunei museum and the Sarawak museum.

== Function ==
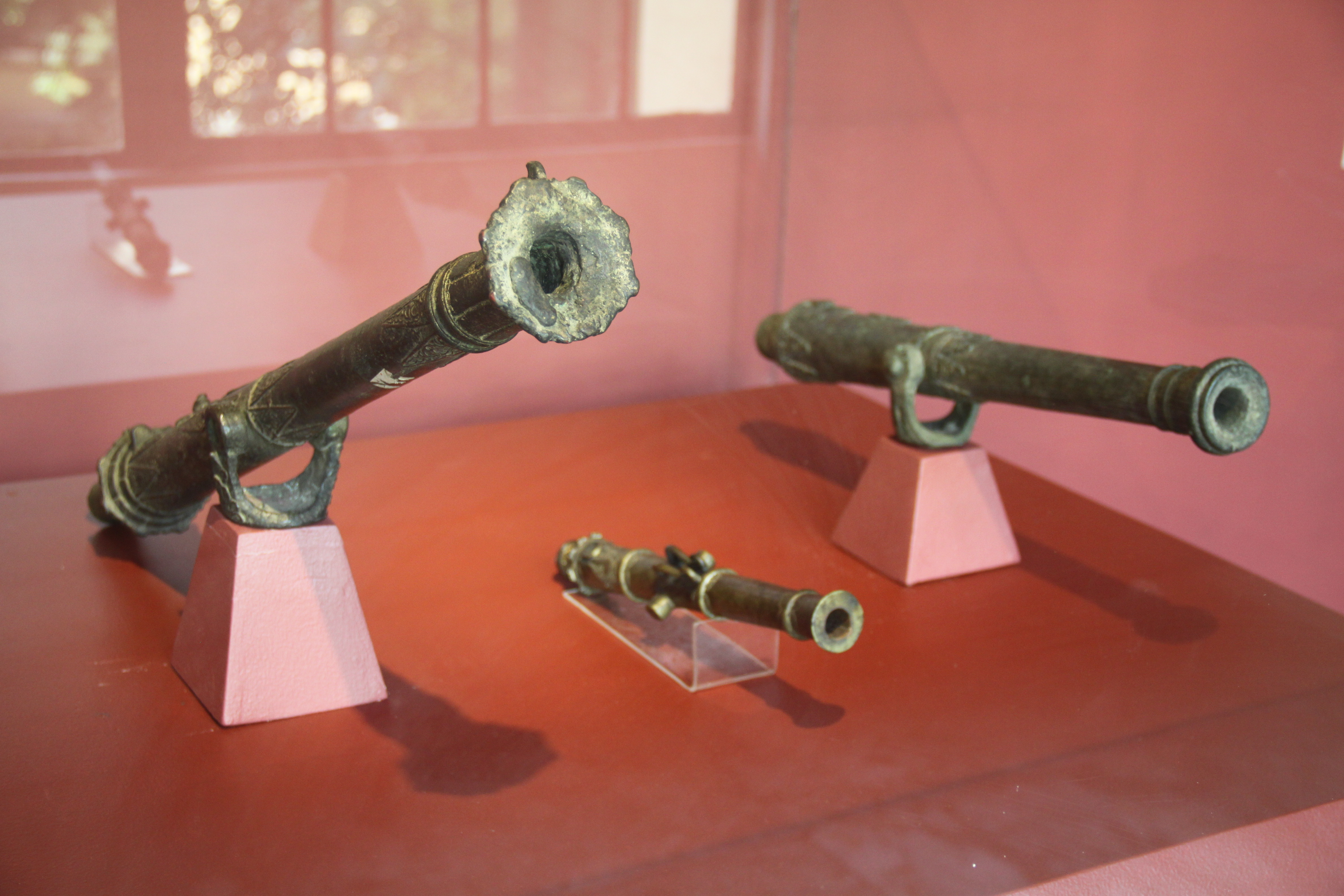
A miniature meriam kecil (center) and two lantakas.

In the archipelago, especially in Borneo and the Indonesian archipelago, miniature meriam kecil are primarily used as a preferred monetary tender, a dowry, as a family heirloom, and a status symbol.

Even though they look like toys, they are functional and dangerous at close range. As documented by G. B. Gardner:

"Malays also made numbers tiny cannon, with bores of half inch to one inch. These were mostly toys, but I believe in war a number of them were sometimes used to defend a gateway. A row fastened to a log and charged with slugs would cause damage at close range. I have seen three barrelled specimens that were obviously made for this purpose."

Although one source said that pistols had not been present in the area until recently and that the miniatures were carried in a waist band or sash and used as hand guns, they would be particularly inconvenient in this application. Maybe they are used to fire salutes or produced as novelty item. However, they can still be found in Indonesia in some quantity at the end of the 20th century. Some miniature meriam kecil are also cast on top of lela barrels for use if the enemy charged before the lela could be reloaded.

In Indonesia during Portuguese and Dutch colonial times, miniature meriam kecil were used as currency for the spice trade. The value of a cannon is determined by the nature and mass of the metal cast and may be increased by the intricacy of its embellishment. To fulfill local demand for these currency, miniature meriam kecil were cast in Portugal and Holland in conventional European cannon designs or inscribed with the VOC logo. Today some of these miniature meriam kecil can be found on the spice islands (Flores, Maluku, and Timor) of east Indonesia and Riau islands.

== See also ==
- Cetbang
- Lantaka
- Swivel gun
- Pistol
- Ekor lotong
