= Lela (cannon) =

Type of Malay cannon

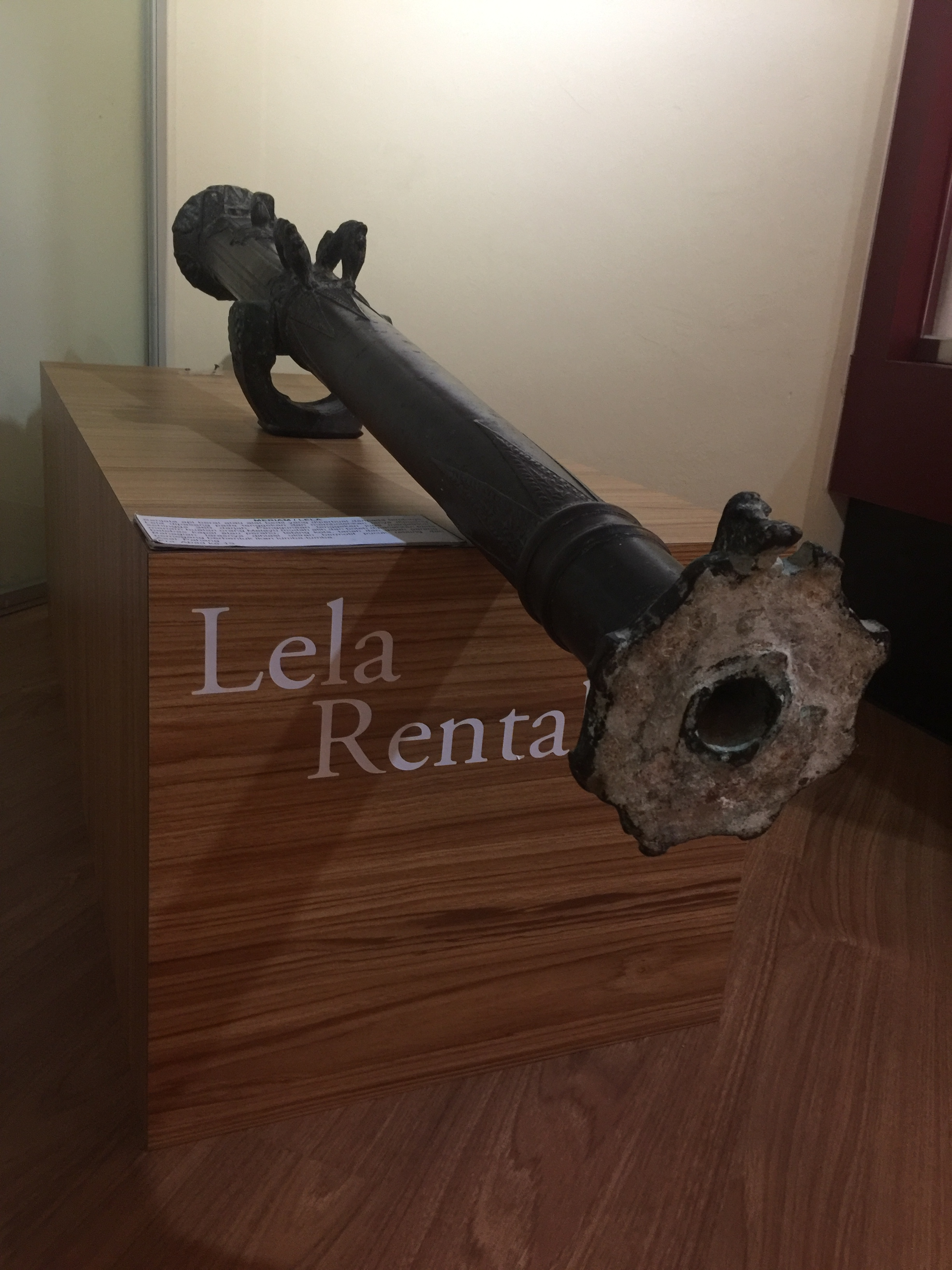
19th century lela from Pahang. This specimen has two dolphins and a cagak (swivel yoke).

Lela or lila is a type of Malay cannon, used widely in the Nusantara archipelago. They are similar to a lantaka but longer and had larger bore. Lela can be configured as swivel gun, fixed gun, or mounted in a gun carriage. It is the equivalent of European falcon and falconet.

== Etymology ==
The cannon was named after a heroine of the Malay classic romance story called "Laila Majnun". It seems that the adoption of the word stems from the name given to some particular piece. The customs of naming special cannon was not uncommon in Europe in the early days and also in Nusantara to the recent times. On Malay literature the name is usually coupled with rentaka, as "lela rentaka". It is also called as lilla by the Dutch and lelo in several parts of the archipelago.

== Description ==
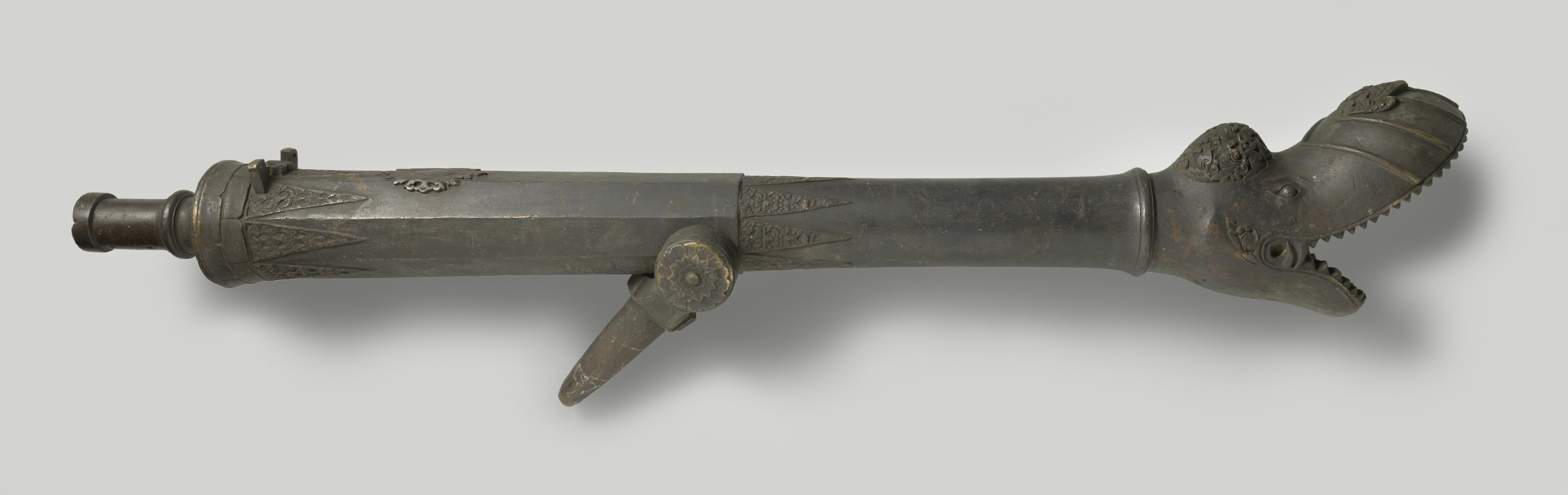
Meriam naga or lela naga (dragon-head lela), from 1667. 172 cm (68 in) long with diameter of 22 cm (8.7 in), 150.6 kg (332 lb) in weight. Captured during the Jambi expedition, August 1858.

Usually lela are about 100–180 cm (39–71 in) long and made from brass or bronze. They fire 1.13–2.5 kg (2.5–5.5 lb) round shot with a range of over 360 m (1,180 ft). Alternatively they can also be loaded with scattershots (grapeshot or case shot). Malay cannon usually fired stone balls made from boulders of riverbanks, and to lesser extent were cast metal balls from iron or brass. They used lead and tin slugs (called "dadu-dadu") at close quarters, and the case shot were made of stones in a rattan basket. Lela has a bore (caliber) of between 19 and 76.2 mm (0.75 and 3.00 in). Some big lela are double barreled and sometimes one or more miniature meriam kecil were cast on top of their barrel for use if the enemy charged before the gun could be reloaded. Lela rambang or jala rambang is a type of lela, made from brass, with blunderbuss (flared) muzzle which fired slugs or stones. They are also called lela mulut katak (frog-mouthed lela).

Lela always had a tube cast in the back, in which a wooden handle or tiller would be fitted. This tiller is used for aiming the gun. Lela has forked pivot mount (called cagak, cangkak lela, or rangking) with spike underneath to fit it on a ship's rail or the edge of a stockade. For land use they are commonly placed on corners of a fort or stockade, so they could cover alternately two different walls. Often, they have dolphins (metal lugs on top to lift the cannon) but they may be purely ornamental, as they can be picked up without hoisting it with ropes. Compared to European falconet with its history dating back to the 1500s, lela were shorter in range and lighter in weight but excels in ornamentation and design.

Worn out, heavier lela, at Sanggau, West Kalimantan, Indonesia.

Lela also refer to medium to large size Malay cannon. According to Isabella L. Bird, lelah is long and heavy gun made from brass, used for the defense of the stockades behind which the Malays usually fight (apilan and kota mara, or the Malay kubu fortification). They can reach as far as 1000 yards (914 m), and fire 4 pound (1.8 kg) shot.

== History ==
The origin of gunpowder-based weaponry in Nusantara archipelago can be traced from the late 13th century. The Mongol invasion of Java brought gunpowder technology to Java in the form of a cannon (Chinese: 炮—"Pào"). This resulted in eastern-style cetbang which is similar to Chinese cannon. Swivel guns however, only developed in the archipelago because of the close maritime relations of the Nusantara archipelago with the territory of West India after 1460 CE, which brought new types of gunpowder weapons to the archipelago, likely through Arab intermediaries. This weapon seems to be a cannon and gun of Ottoman tradition, for example the prangi, which is a breech-loading swivel gun. A new type of cetbang, called the western-style cetbang, was derived from the Turkish prangi. Just like prangi, this cetbang is a breech-loading swivel gun made of bronze or iron, firing single rounds or scattershot (a large number of small bullets).

The earliest lela, just like lantaka, were breech-loaded weapons. This indicated that the cetbang is the direct predecessor of them. Michael Charney (2004) pointed out that early Malay swivel guns were breech-loaded. There is a trend toward muzzle-loading weapons during colonial times. Nevertheless, when Malacca fell to the Portuguese in 1511 CE, both breech-loading and muzzle-loading swivel guns were found and captured by the Portuguese.

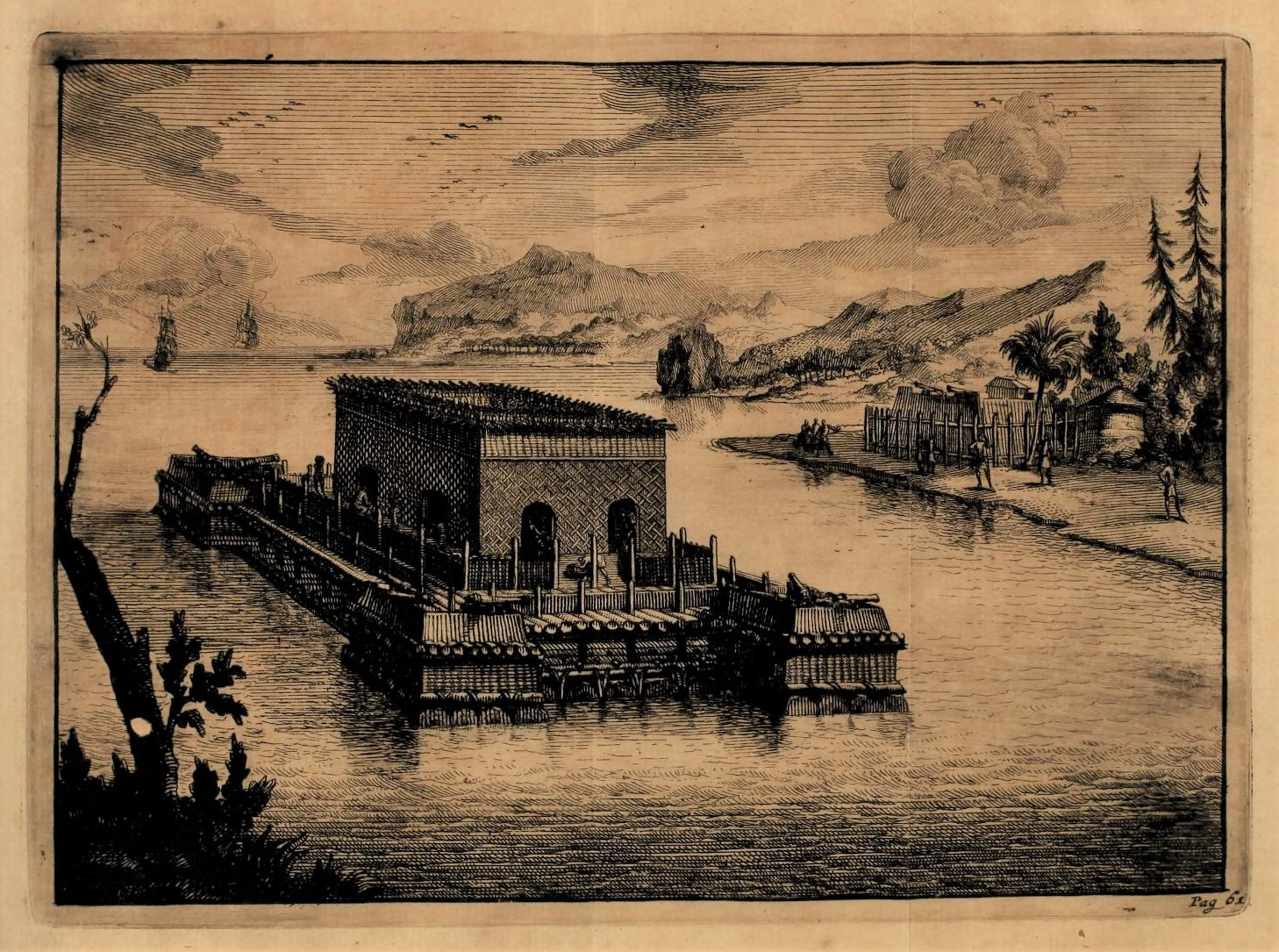
A drawing of a floating water castle (kotta mara) from Hachelijke reys-togt van Jacob Jansz de Roy.

De Barros mentions that with the fall of Malacca (1511), Albuquerque captured 3,000 out of 8,000 artillery. Among those, 2,000 were made from brass and the rest from iron, in the style of Portuguese Berço (breech-loading swivel gun). All of the artillery had its proper complement of carriages which could not be rivalled even by Portugal. Afonso de Albuquerque compared Malaccan gun founders as being on the same level as those of Germany. However, he did not state what ethnicity the Malaccan gun founders were. Duarte Barbosa stated that the arquebus-maker of Malacca was Javanese. The Javanese also manufactured their own cannon in Malacca. The Javanese handled much of the productive work in Malacca before 1511 and in 17th century Pattani.

Wan Mohd Dasuki Wan Hasbullah explained several facts about the existence of gunpowder weapons in Malacca and other Malay states before the arrival of the Portuguese:

1. No evidence showed that guns, cannons, and gunpowder were made in Malay states.
2. No evidence showed that guns were ever used by the Malacca Sultanate before the Portuguese attack, even from Malay sources themselves.
3. Based on the majority of cannons reported by the Portuguese, the Malays preferred small artillery.

The cannons found in Malacca were of various types: esmeril (1/4 to 1/2-pounder swivel gun, probably refers to cetbang or lantaka), falconet (a cast bronze swivel gun larger than the esmeril, 1- to 2-pounder), medium saker (long cannon or culverin between a six and a ten pounder, probably refers to meriam), and bombard (short, fat, and heavy cannon). The Malays also had 1 beautiful large cannon sent by the king of Calicut.

Despite having a lot of artillery and firearms, the weapons of Malacca were mostly and mainly purchased from the Javanese and Gujarati, where the Javanese and Gujarati were the operators of the weapons. In the early 16th century, before the Portuguese arrival, the Malays were a people who lacked firearms. The Malay chronicle, Sejarah Melayu, mentioned that in 1509 they did not understand “why bullets killed”, indicating their unfamiliarity with using firearms in battle, if not in ceremony. As recorded in Sejarah Melayu:

Setelah datang ke Melaka, maka bertemu, ditembaknya dengan meriam. Maka segala orang Melaka pun hairan, terkejut mendengar bunyi meriam itu. Katanya, "Bunyi apa ini, seperti guruh ini?". Maka meriam itu pun datanglah mengenai orang Melaka, ada yang putus lehernya, ada yang putus tangannya, ada yang panggal pahanya. Maka bertambahlah hairannya orang Melaka melihat fi'il bedil itu. Katanya: "Apa namanya senjata yang bulat itu maka dengan tajamnya maka ia membunuh?"
After (the Portuguese) coming to Malacca, then met (each other), they shot (the city) with cannon. So all the people of Malacca were surprised, shocked to hear the sound of the cannon. They said, "What is this sound, like thunder?". Then the cannon came about the people of Malacca, some lost their necks, some lost their arms, some lost their thighs. The people of Malacca were even more astonished to see the effect of the gun. They said: "What is this weapon called that is round, yet is sharp enough to kill?"

Lendas da India by Gaspar Correia and Asia Portuguesa by Manuel de Faria y Sousa confirmed Sejarah Melayu's account. Both recorded a similar story, although not as spectacular as described in Sejarah Melayu. The Epic of Hang Tuah narrates a Malaccan expedition to the country of Rum (the Ottoman Empire) to buy bedil (guns) and large meriam (cannons) after their first encounter with the Portuguese in 1509 CE, indicating their shortage of firearms and gunpowder weapons. (Note: Maka kata Laksamana, "Adapun hamba sekalian datang ini dititahkan oleh Sultan Melaka membawa surat dan bingkisan tanda berkasih-kasihan antara Sultan Melaka dan duli Sultan Rum, serta hendak membeli bedil dan meriam yang besar-besar. Adalah kekurangan sedikit bedil yang besar-besar di dalam negeri Melaka itu. Adapun hamba lihat tanah di atas angin ini terlalu banyak bedil yang besar-besar.”. Translation: Then the Admiral said, "As for our reason for coming here, we were ordered by the Sultan of Melaka to bring a letter and a gift of sympathy between the Sultan of Melaka and the Sultan of Rum, as well as to buy large guns and cannons. There is a shortage of large guns in the state of Melaka. While I see that the land above the wind has too many big guns.") The Malaccan expedition to Rum (Ottoman Turks) to buy cannons never actually happened, it was only mentioned in the fictitious literature Hikayat Hang Tuah, which in reality was based on the sending of a series of Acehnese embassies to the Ottoman Empire in the 16th century.

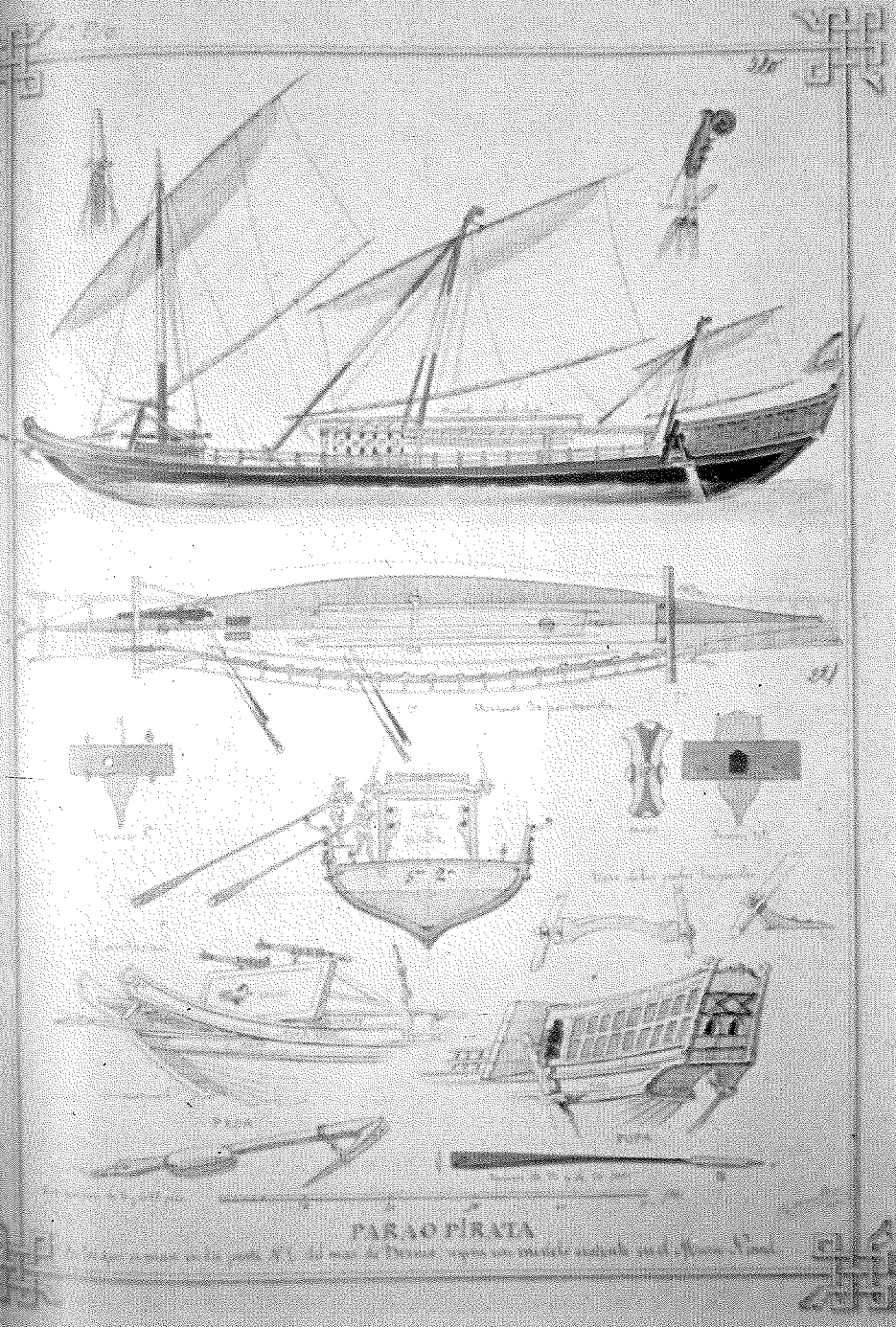
Detail of a lanong. Apilan and sunting apilan can be seen.

In 1600 CE, lela cannons were becoming more common in the archipelago. Several renowned foundries of the region were Terengganu in the Malay peninsula, Gresik in Java, and the Minangkabau lands of interior Sumatra, at Brunei and Banjarmasin in Borneo, Sulu in Southern Philippines, Makassar in Sulawesi, and Aceh.

Lela were also used in Banjarese fortified raft called kotta mara. The kotta mara could be used as floating battery or as a water castle. Rectangular kotta mara could be equipped with 12 lela, while the kotta mara with corner bastions could mount 16 lela.

Lela were mounted on the apilan (gunshield) of Malay war and piratical prahu. Sunting apilan is the name given to two lelas or light guns standing on the gun-shield of a heavy gun.

Lieutenant T.J. Newbold recorded about the Malay pirate prahu:

The prahus used by Malay pirates are from eight to ten tons burthen, extremely well manned and remarkably fast, particularly with the paddles commonly used. They are generally armed with swivels on their bows, centre, and stern, of small calibre, but long range. When preparing to attack, strong bulwarks of wood called Apilans are erected, behind which the crew ensconce themselves, fighting with their long guns until their prey is disabled; or till the gong sound the signal for boarding.

— Journal of the Asiatic Society of Bengal, Volume 5

Brunei was known for its foundries in the 19th century. Brass was the preferred metal as it was cheaper and easier to work compared to the related but harder alloy bronze, or iron. However, bronze is much stronger and was therefore more popular for use in making weapons. The process used was cire perdue using terracotta and a wax mould.

Bangsamoro of Philippines were still using rentaka and lela during the Philippine–American War of 1899–1902. Rentaka and lela were brought by Malay from Peninsular and Borneo Malay to Southern Philippine. Bangsamoro have since retained more of the adopted Malay culture relative to the rest of the Philippines.

== Gallery ==
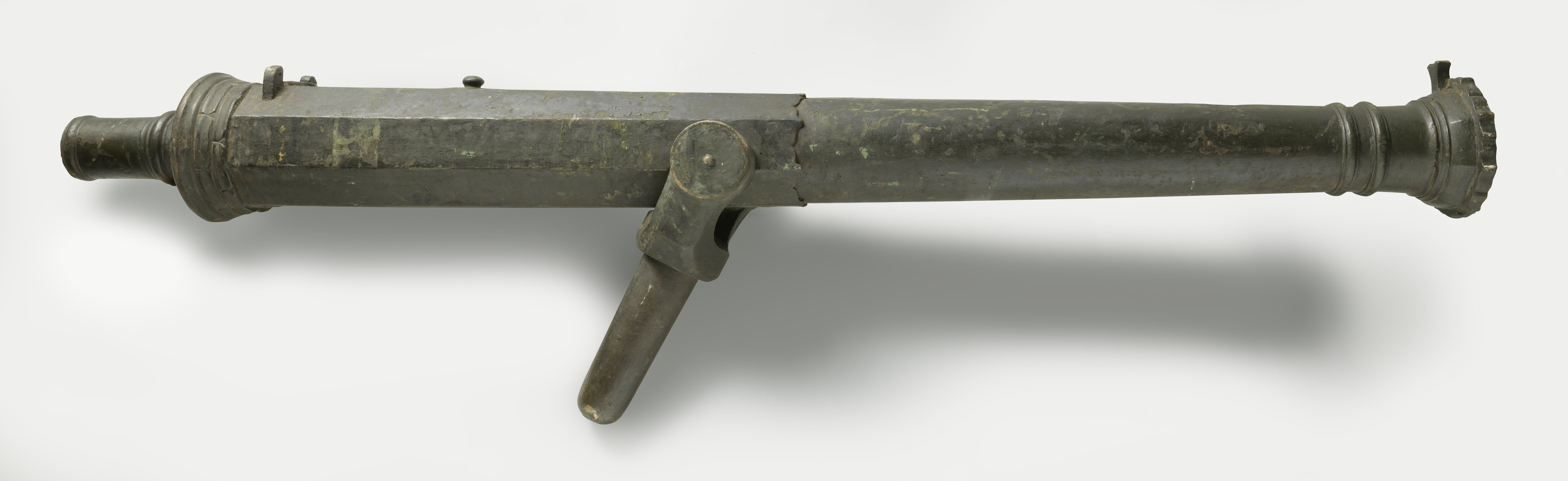
A 1.5-pounder (0.68 kg) lilla. 176.5 cm long, 5.5 cm in caliber.

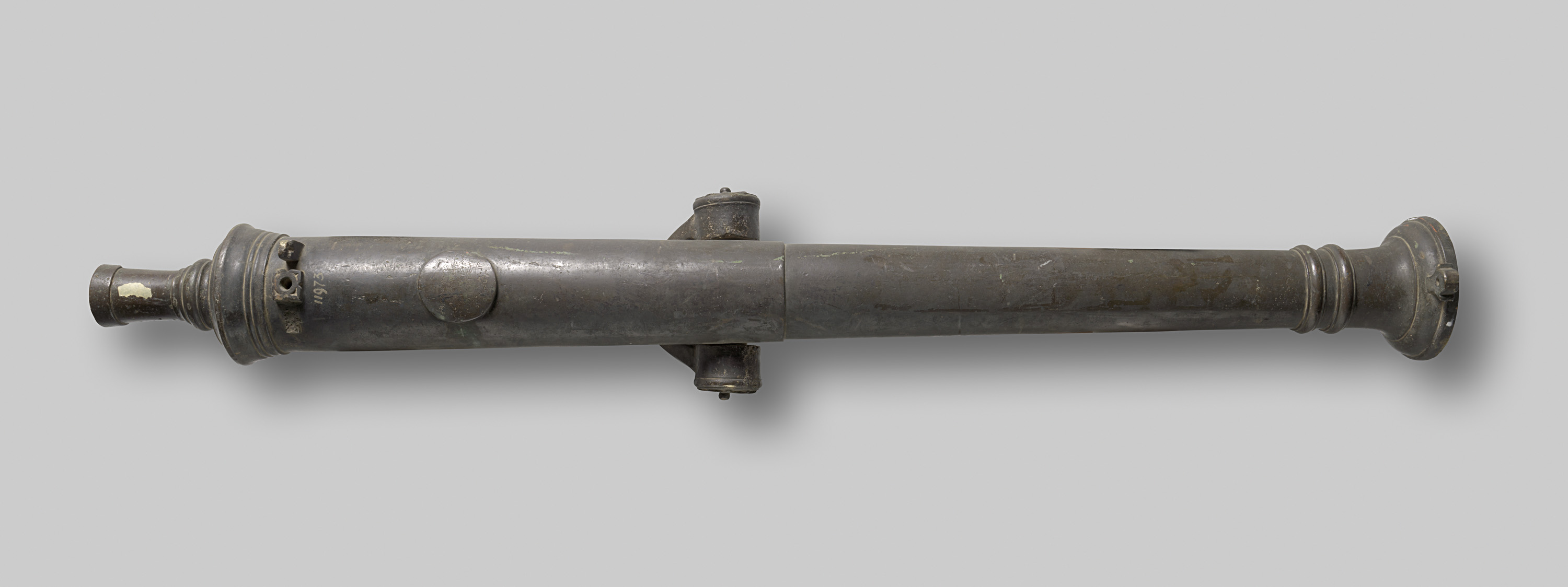
Lela with Arabic inscription, which reads "Peace be upon him in the hijri year 1267", referring to the founding year (1850–1851 CE). Length: 164 cm, caliber: 37 mm.

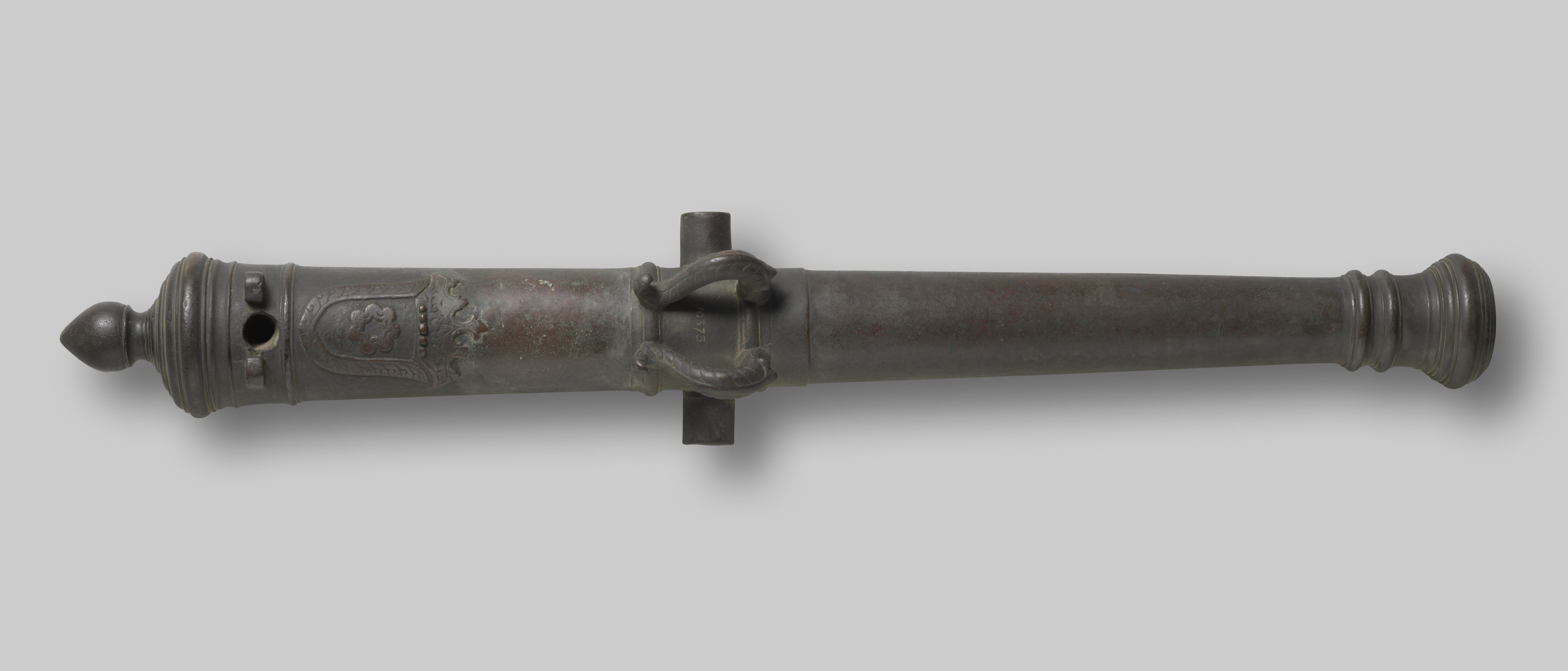
Western-styled lilla (draaibas) from Lombok, captured from Lombok in 1894. 128 cm long with 41 mm caliber.

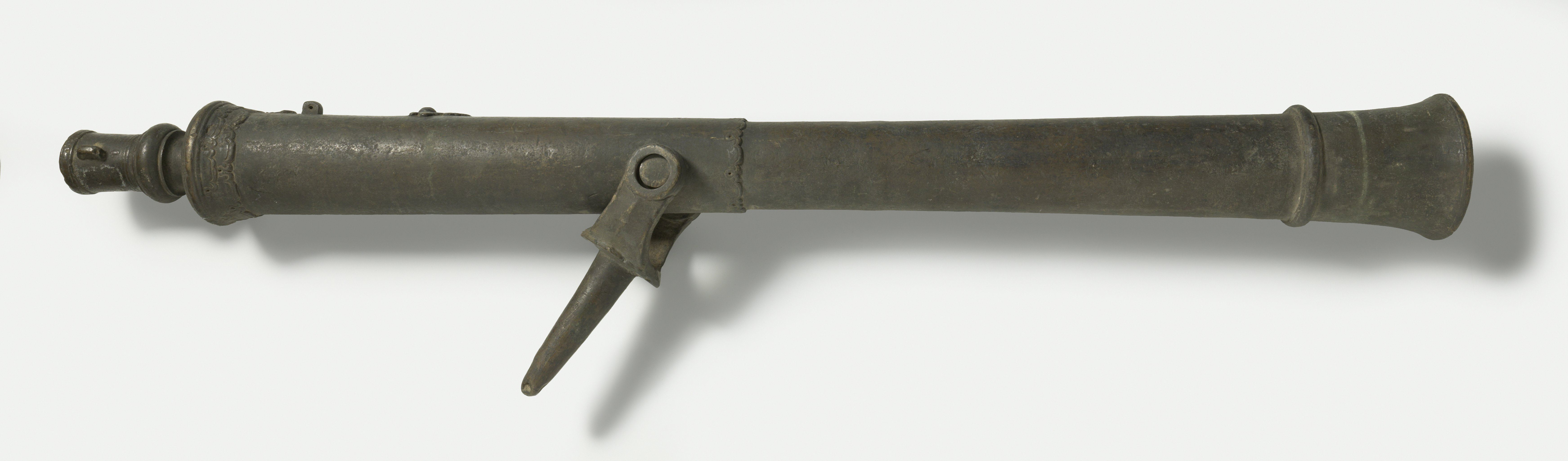
Blunderbuss lela, 115 cm long. The diameter of the flared muzzle is 8.4 cm.

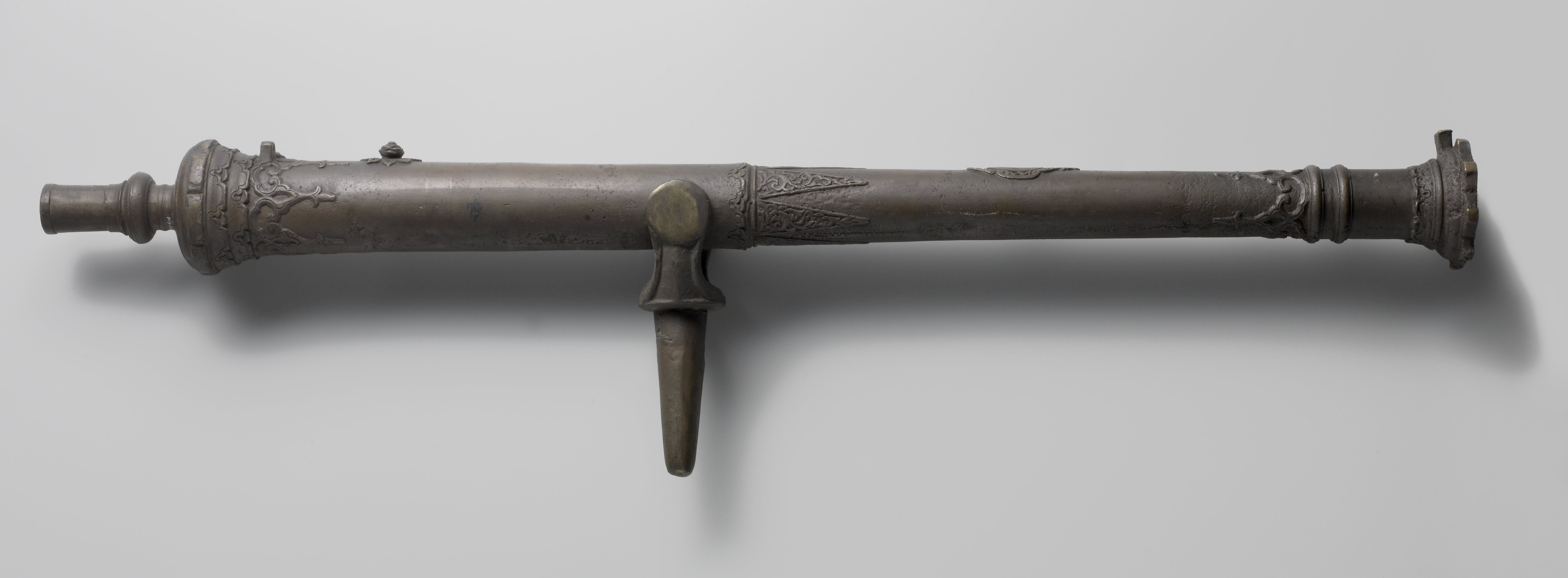
Lela captured by paddle steamer Amsterdam near Tanjung Pulisan on the northeast coast of Celebes from pirates. 119 cm long, 16 mm caliber. Weight: 30.6 kg.

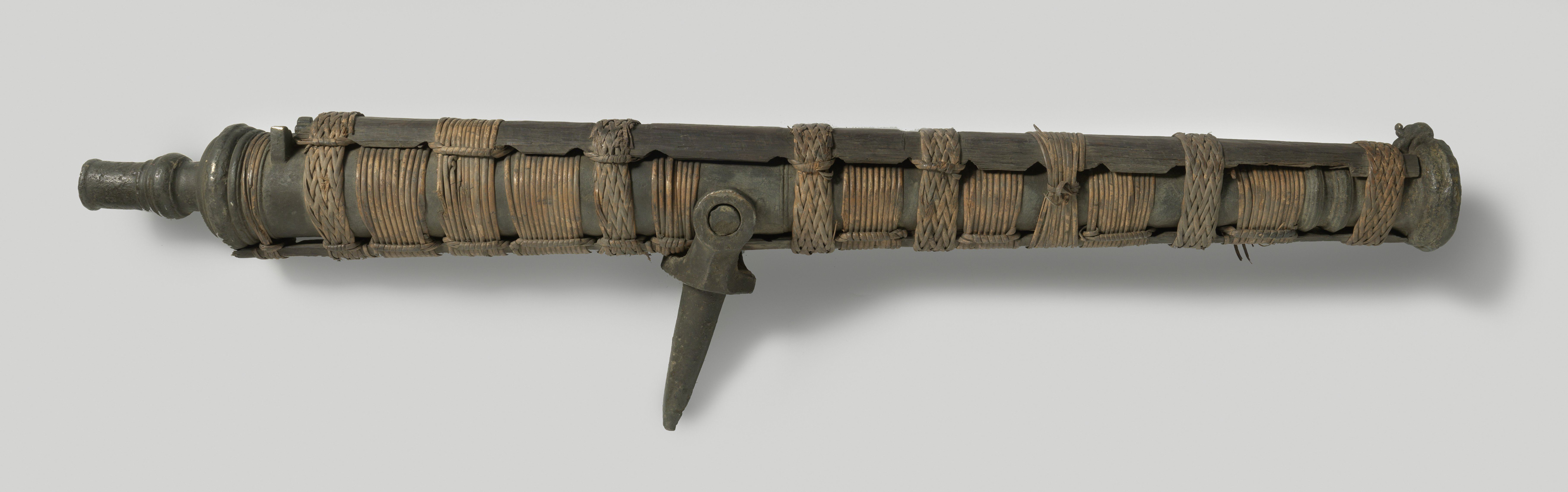
Bronze muzzle-loading lela, reinforced with 2 pieces of bamboo and fastened with rattan. 144 cm long, 36 mm in caliber. Weight: 70 kg.

== See also ==
- Cetbang, earlier, 14th century cannon
- Rentaka, smaller version of lela
- Ekor lotong, swivel gun with monkey tail shape
- Apilan and kota mara, structure on Malay ships used for mounting cannon
