= Ekor lotong =

Swivel gun with monkey tail tiller

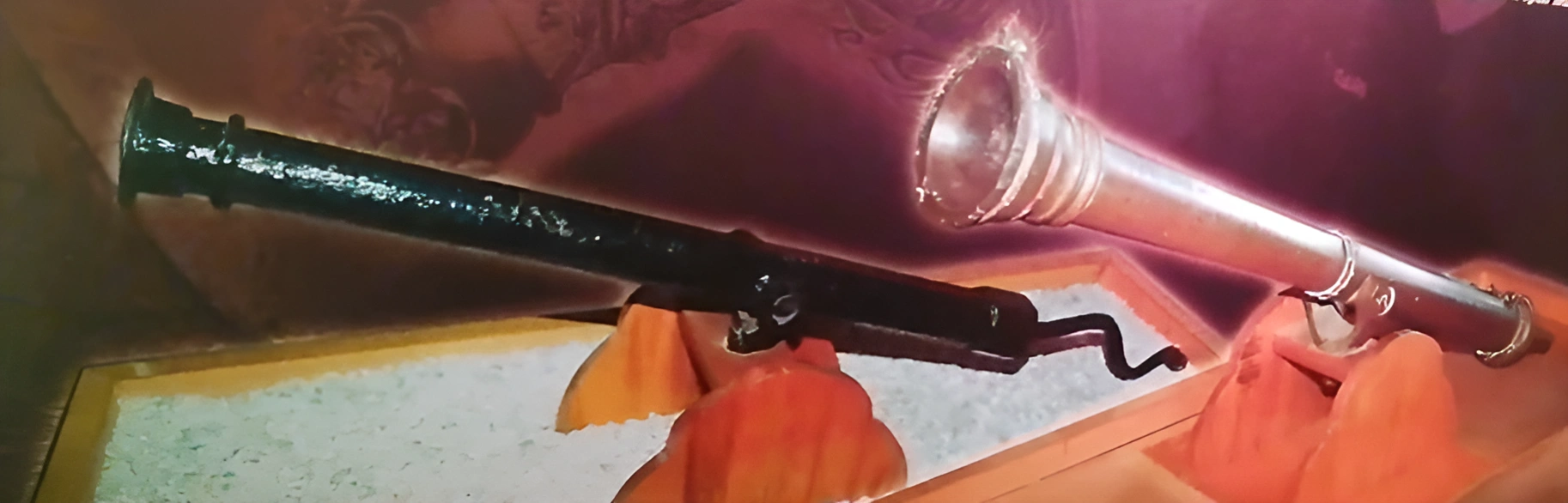
Two swivel guns in Muzium Istana Jahar, Kota Bharu, Kelantan, Malaysia. The black one is an ekor lutong.

Ekor lotong, ekor lutong, or ekor lutung refers to a kind of traditional Malay blackpowder weapon. It is also known as monkey tail cannon.

The ekor lotong is a kind of relatively small swivel cannon. Typically, ekor lotongs are made of iron. The name "ekor lotong" means "tail of a lotong" refers to the handle on the back of the cannon used to aim the cannon. The handle is usually curved (resembling a monkey tail), and is also made of iron.

== See also ==
- Rentaka
- Cetbang
