= Prangi =

Type of cannon produced by Ottoman Empire

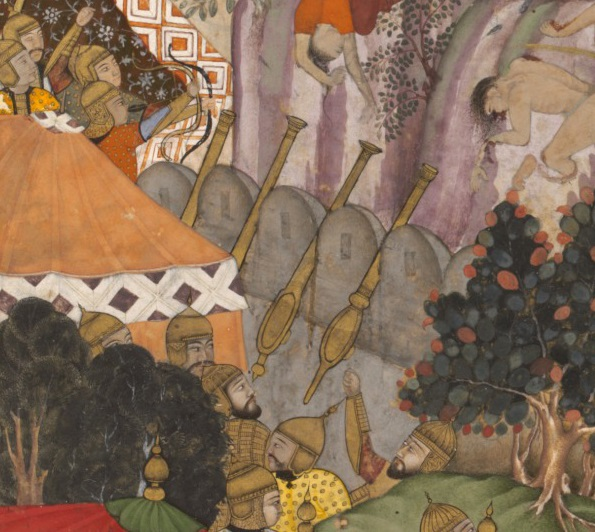
Four breechloading cannon of the Mughal empire depicted in the Akbarnama.

The prangi, paranki, piranki, pirangi, farangi, firingi, or firingiha was a type of cannon produced by the Ottoman Empire. It was subsequently copied and produced in other places such as the Mughal empire under Babur. The prangi was a breech-loading swivel gun.

== Etymology ==
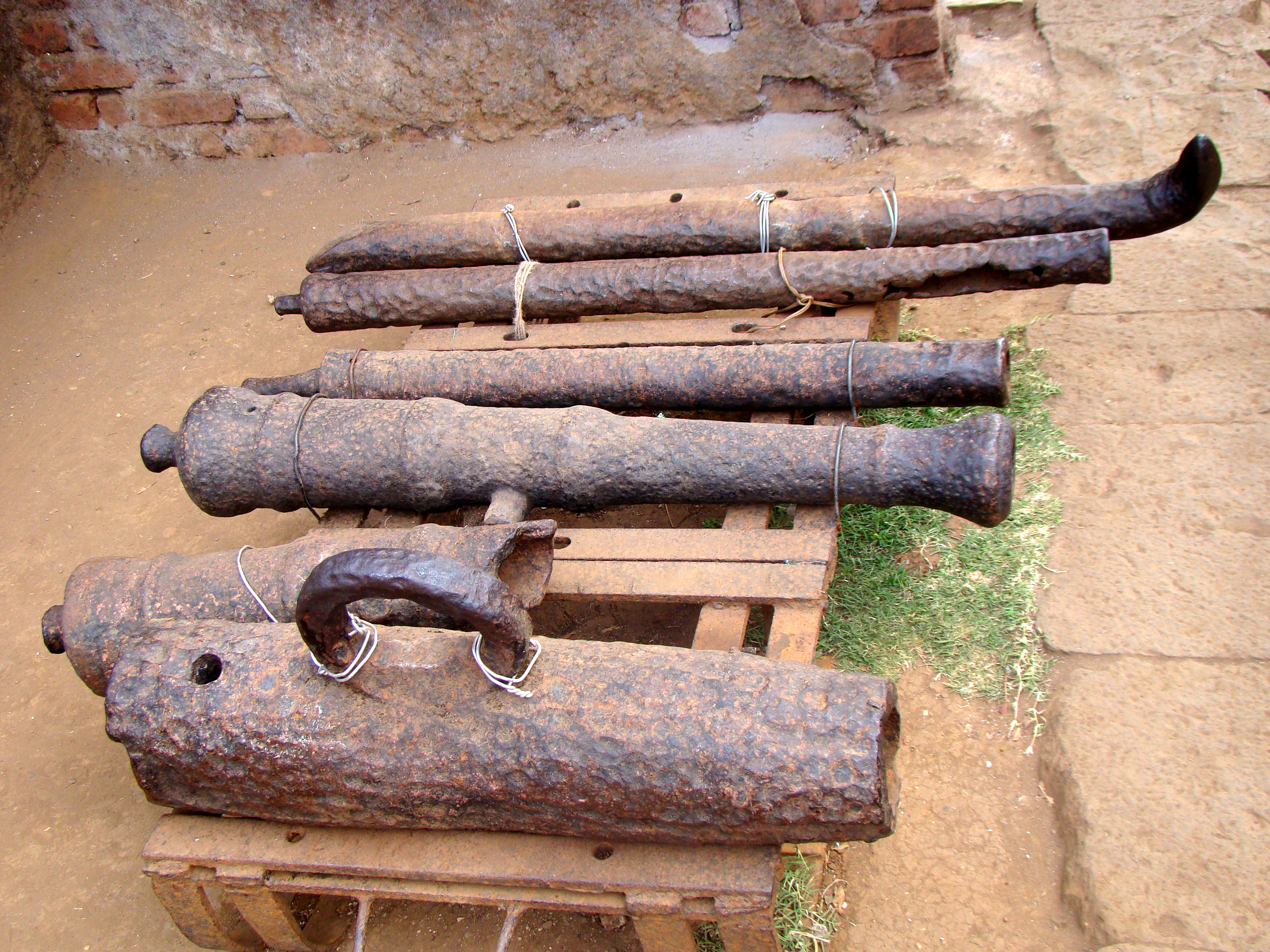
Lowermost: A breech chamber of a Maratha cannon.

Prangi was written in Ottoman sources in various words as prankı, pirankı, parangi, parangı, pranga, pranku, prangu, and parangu. The Ottoman term goes back to the Italian/Spanish braga, short for "petriero a barga" and "pedrero de braga", a small breech-loading swivel gun. Braga itself means "pants" or "breech". Babur called this weapon firingiha and farangi. Malayalam, Tamil, and Telugu speakers call it pīranki and pīrangi.

== History and description ==
Prangi is a small Ottoman breech-loading swivel gun, firing 150 g (5.3 oz) shots, they were built mostly by cast bronze, but iron ones were also used. The Ottomans used the prangi from the mid-15th century onwards in field battles, aboard their ships, and in their forts, where prangis often comprised the majority of the ordnance. At the end of the 15th century, Ottoman galley were equipped with a big cannon and 4 guns (darbzen) and 8 prangi cannons. These ships were 42–43 m (138–141 ft) long with three sails carrying about 328 people. Prangi was a standard piece of Ottoman secondary naval armament. An Ottoman naval record book of inventory and survey dated 10 April 1488 mentioned that Ottoman barça (barque) had 35 prangi, agrıpar (galleas) had 16 prangi, kadırga (galley) had 8 prangi, kalıt (galliot) and kayık (fusta) had 4 prangi.

The spread of prangi cannon to the east resulted in the appearance of the western-style cetbang in the Nusantara archipelago after 1460 CE. In China, these cannons are known by the name of Folangji (佛郎机), Folangji chong (佛郎机铳), or Fo-lang-chi p'ao (佛朗机炮 or 佛朗機砲). Prangi guns reached China before either Ottoman or Portuguese ships did. They may have also reached China via the Silk Road. In the Unofficial Gleanings of the Wanli Era (萬曆野獲編) by Shen Defu, it is said that "After the reign of Hongzhi (1445–1505), China started having Fu-Lang-Ji cannons, the country of which was called in the old times Sam Fu Qi". In volume 30 about "The Red-Haired Foreigners" he wrote "After the reign of Zhengtong (1436–1449) China got hold of Fu-Lang-Ji cannons, the most important magic instrument of foreign people". He mentioned the cannons some 60 or 70 years prior to the first reference to the Portuguese. Pelliot believed that the folangji gun reached China before Portuguese did, possibly by anonymous carriers from Malaya. Needham noted that breech-loading guns were already familiar in Southern China in 1510, as a rebellion in Huang Kuan was destroyed by more than 100 folangji. It may even be earlier, brought to Fujian by a man named Wei Sheng and used in quelling a pirate incident in 1507.

== See also ==
- Breech-loading swivel gun
- Swivel gun
- Zamburak
