= Bedil (term) =

Southeast Asia term for various types of firearms

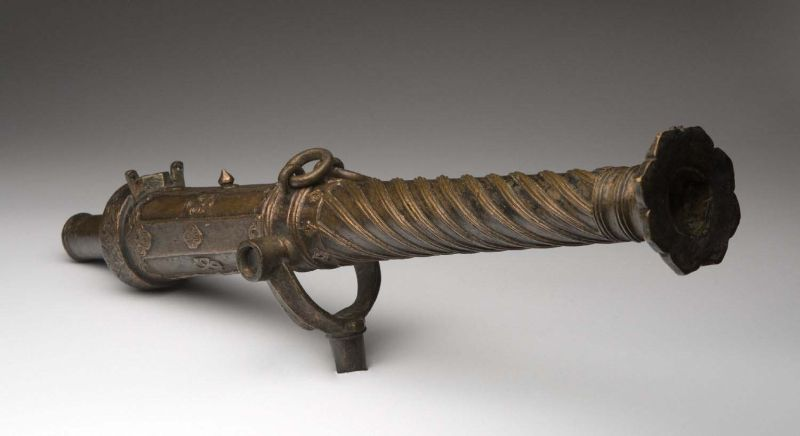
Bronze lantaka with Arabic script, 1700s.

Bedil is a Maritime Southeast Asian term that refers to various types of firearms and gunpowder weapons, ranging from small pistols to large siege guns. The term bedil comes from Tamil wedil (or wediyal) and wediluppu (or wediyuppu). In their original form, these words refer to gunpowder blast and saltpeter, respectively. After being absorbed into bedil in the Malay language and in a number of other cultures in the archipelago, Tamil vocabulary is used to refer to all types of weapons that use gunpowder. The terms bedil and bedhil are known in Javanese and Balinese. In Sundanese the term is bedil, in Batak it is known as bodil, in Makassarese badili, in Buginese, balili, in Dayak language, badil, in Tagalog, baril, in Bisayan, bádil, in Bikol languages, badil, and in Malay it is badel or bedil.

== History ==
It is possible that gunpowder weapons were used in Java by Kublai Khan's Chinese forces who sought to invade Java in 1293. The Javanese gun used in the Majapahit era has also been referred to as bedil.

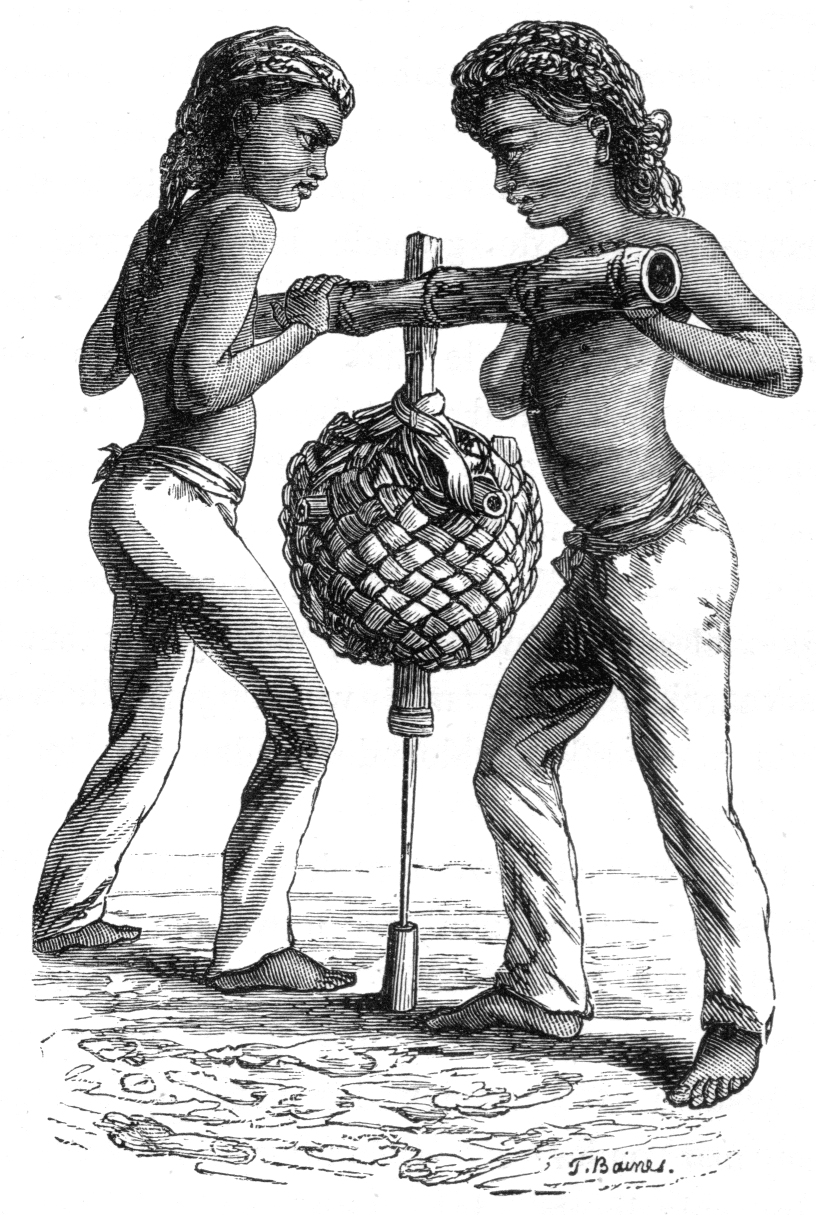
Gun-boring in Lombok, 1869: "The bottom of the pole has an iron ring, and a hole in which four-cornered borers of hardened iron can be fitted. The barrel to be bored is buried upright in the ground, the borer is inserted into it, the top of the stick or vertical shaft is held by a cross-piece of bamboo with a hole in it, and the basket is filled with stones to get the required weight. Two boys turn the bamboo round."

The knowledge of making "true" firearms probably came to Southeast Asia in the late fifteenth century via the Islamic nations of West Asia, most probably the Arabs. The precise year of introduction is unknown, but it may be safely concluded to be no earlier than 1460. This resulted in the development of Java arquebus, which was also called a bedil. Portuguese influence on local weaponry after the capture of Malacca (1511), resulted in a new type of hybrid tradition matchlock firearm, the istinggar.

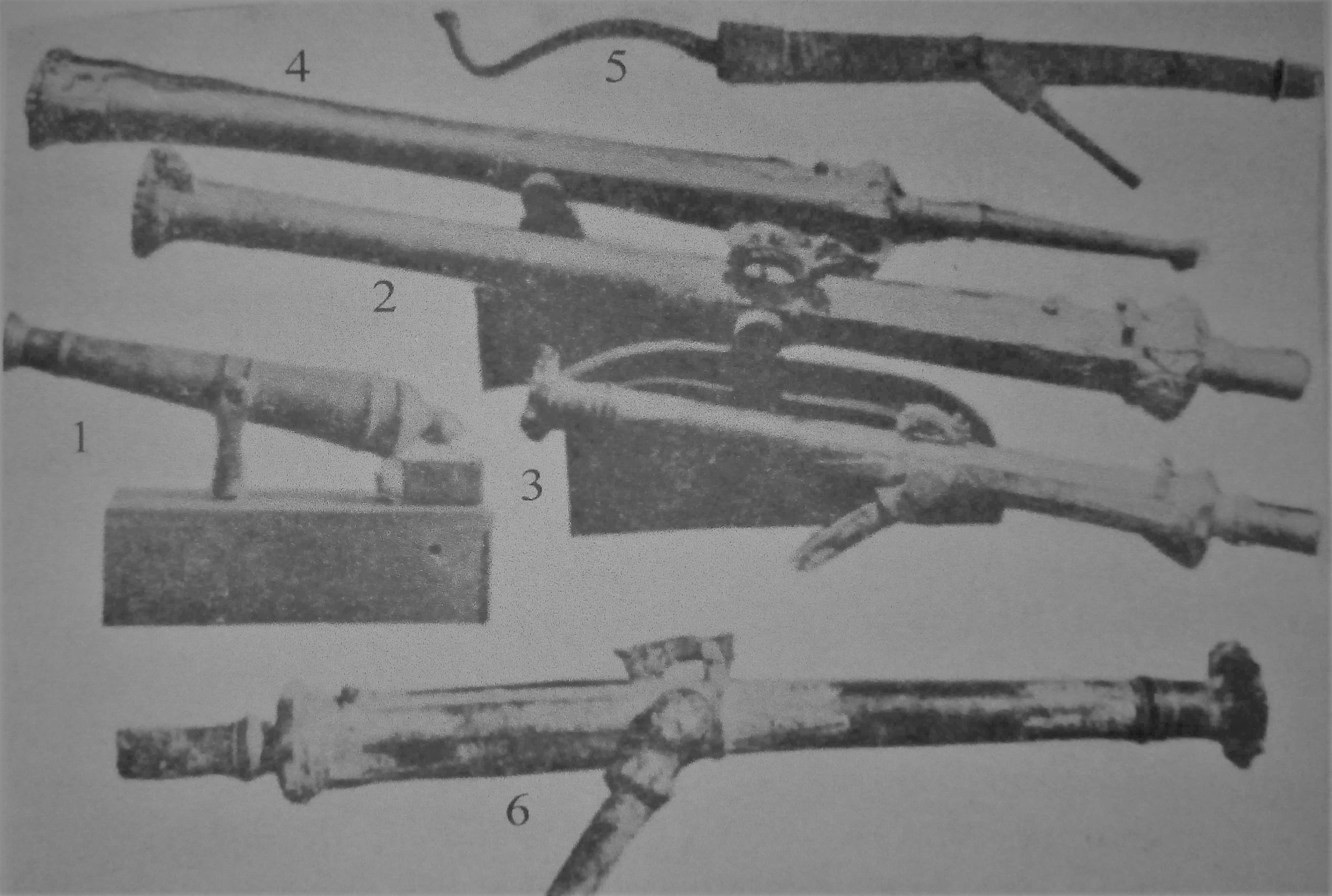
Variety of Malay cannons: (1) Meriam kalok, short and squat swivel gun. (2) Lela. (3) Lela (or rentaka). (4) Lela rambang (blunderbuss lela). (5) Ekor lotong. (6) Lela.

Portuguese and Spanish invaders were unpleasantly surprised and even outgunned occasionally. Duarte Barbosa recorded the abundance of gunpowder-based weapons in Java c. 1514. The Javanese were deemed as expert gun casters and good artillerymen. The weapon found there include one-pounder cannons, long muskets, spingarde (arquebus), schioppi (hand cannon), Greek fire, guns (cannons), and other fire-works. When Malacca fell to the Portuguese in 1511 A.D., breech-loading swivel guns (cetbang) and muzzle-loading swivel guns (lela and rentaka) were found and captured by the Portuguese. In the battle, the Malays were using cannons, matchlock guns, and "firing tubes". By the early 16th century, the Javanese already produced large guns, some of them still survived until the present day and are dubbed as "sacred cannon" or "holy cannon". These cannons varied between 180 and 260-pounders, weighing anywhere between 3–8 tons, length of them between 3–6 m (9.8–19.7 ft).

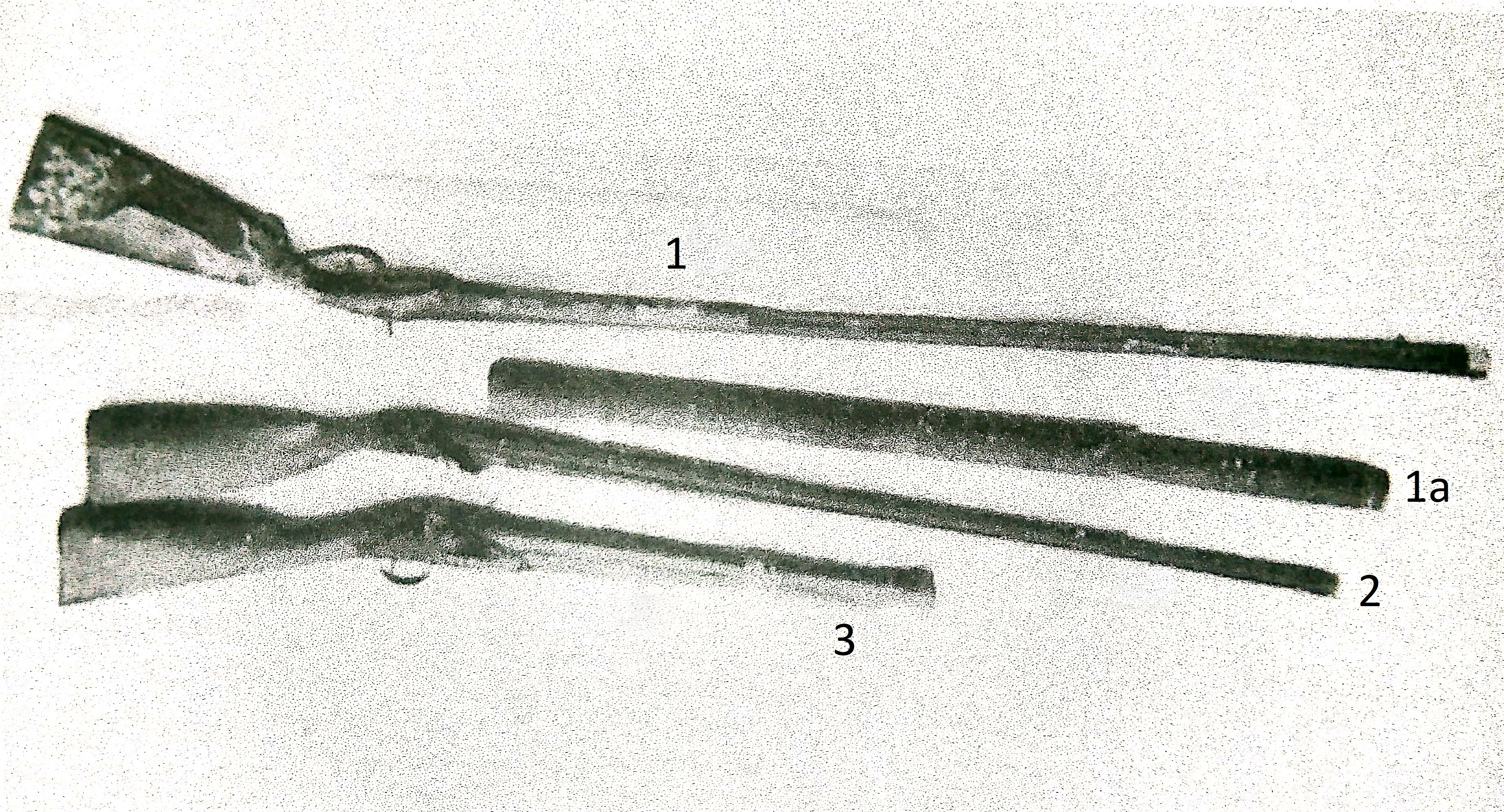
Malay firearms (post-1800): (1) Long ornamented flintlock gun (senapang/senapan). (1a) Bamboo and rattan barrel cover. (2) Flintlock gun (senapang/senapan). (3) Brass blunderbuss (pemuras).

Saltpeter harvesting was recorded by Dutch and German travelers as being common in even the smallest villages and was collected from the decomposition process of large dung hills specifically piled for the purpose. The Dutch punishment for possession of non-permitted gunpowder appears to have been amputation. Ownership and manufacture of gunpowder was later prohibited by the colonial Dutch occupiers. According to colonel McKenzie quoted in Sir Thomas Stamford Raffles', The History of Java (1817), the purest sulfur was supplied from a crater from a mountain near the straits of Bali.

For firearms with flintlock mechanisms, the inhabitants of the Nusantara archipelago depended on European powers, as no local metalsmiths were capable of producing such complex components. Flintlock firearms were different weapons, also known as senapan or senapang, derived from the Dutch word snaphaan. In the gun-making regions of Nusantara, these senapan could be produced locally, with the barrel and wooden components crafted in Nusantara, and mechanism imported from European traders.

== List of weapons classified as bedil ==
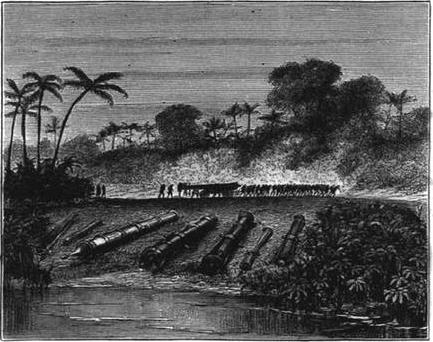
Ottoman and Acehnese guns, dismantled following the Dutch conquest of Aceh in 1874.

The following weapons were historically referred to as bedil. Full descriptions are available on their respective pages.

Bedil tombak
Locally made pole gun-type hand cannon.
Cetbang
A type of cannon that was produced in Majapahit.
Ekor lotong
A swivel gun that resembles a lutung monkey's tail.
Istinggar
A type of matchlock firearm, result of Portuguese influence to local weaponry after the capture of Malacca in 1511.
Java arquebus
An early long matchlock firearm from Java, used before the arrival of Iberian explorers.
Lantaka
A type of bronze portable cannon or swivel gun, mounted on merchant vessels and warships in Maritime Southeast Asia.
Lela
A type of cannon similar to a rentaka, but larger in dimension.
Meriam
A term formerly used for a cannon that fires a shot weighing 6 pounds (2.7 kg). It is now a colloquial Malaysian and Indonesian term for a cannon.
Miniature meriam kecil
Also known as a currency cannon, this firearm is primarily produced as a novelty and trading item.
Pemuras
Native term for blunderbuss.
Rentaka
Native swivel gun, considered popular amongst the Malays.
Terakul
A type of dragoon pistol.

== See also ==
- Firearm
- Cannon
- Artillery
