= Jiaozhi arquebus =

Historical Vietnamese firearms

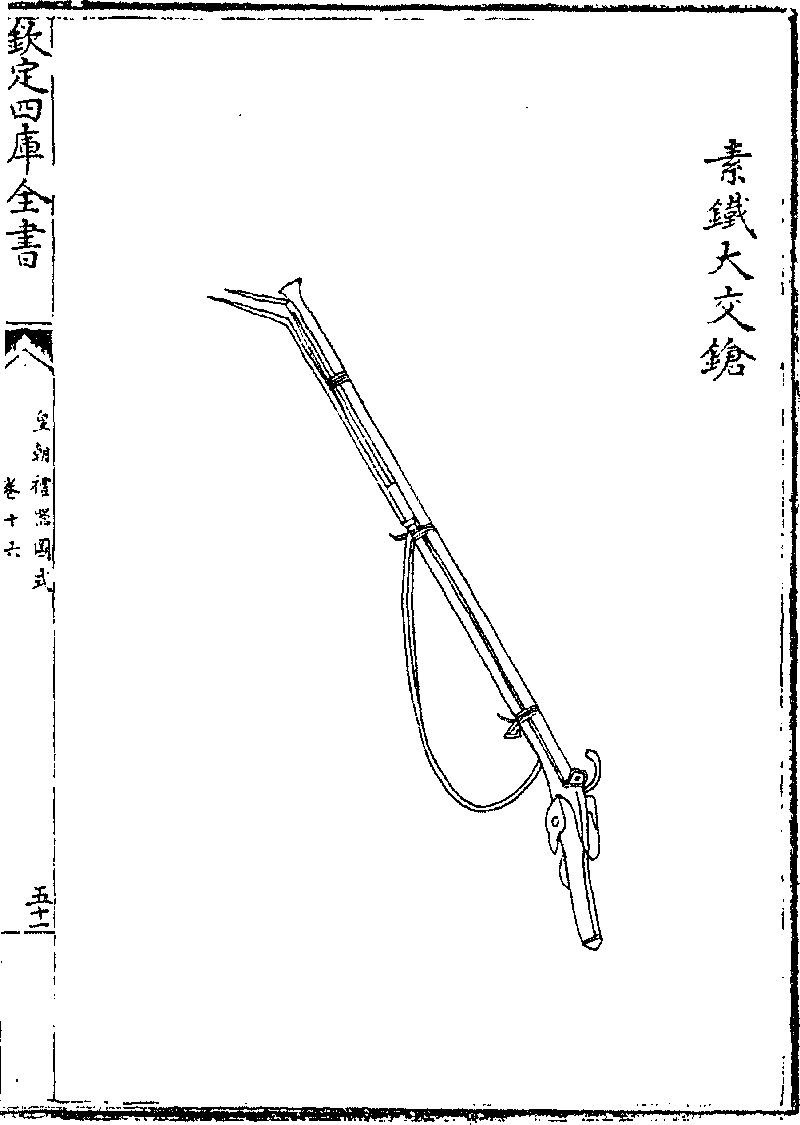
Jiaozhi arquebus in 1739. Painting from "The royal court ceremonies" (皇朝禮器圖式) of the Qing dynasty.

Jiaozhi arquebus (Giao Chỉ arquebus or Vietnamese arquebus) refers to several types of gunpowder firearms produced historically in Vietnam. This page also includes Vietnamese muskets — since the early definition of a musket is a "heavy arquebus". The term Jiaozhi arquebus comes from Chinese word Jiao Chong (交銃, lit. 'Jiaozhi Gun'), a generalization of firearms originating from Dai Viet.

== History ==
Đại Việt has a relatively early history of using gunpowder weapons. At the end of the 14th century, king Po Binasuor of Champa, while surveying the Hải Triều River, died in battle when he was hit by a hand cannon from the Trần army. In the Hồ dynasty, Hồ Nguyên Trừng successfully invented the Thần Cơ Sang cannon. By the time of the Lê Sơ period, gunpowder weapons began to be widely used in the army. In Thailand, a gun initially thought to have originated in China was discovered, however, based on the inscriptions on the gun, it was confirmed to be of Đại Việt origin. This is most likely a relic from the invasion of the Lanna kingdom (present day Chiang Mai) under Lê Thánh Tông from 1479–1484.

By the 16th century, when Europeans came to Đại Việt for trading, Western weapons were purchased by the Trịnh and Nguyễn lords to equip their armies, and muskets began to be imported into Đại Việt ever since. Tomé Pires in his Suma Oriental (1515) mentioned that Cochinchina had an innumerable number of musketeers and small bombards, and that a lot of gunpowder was used in warfare and amusements. The Đại Việt musket was not only used domestically, but it was also introduced to China after the border conflicts between the Mạc dynasty and ethnic minorities in Guangxi and Yunnan.

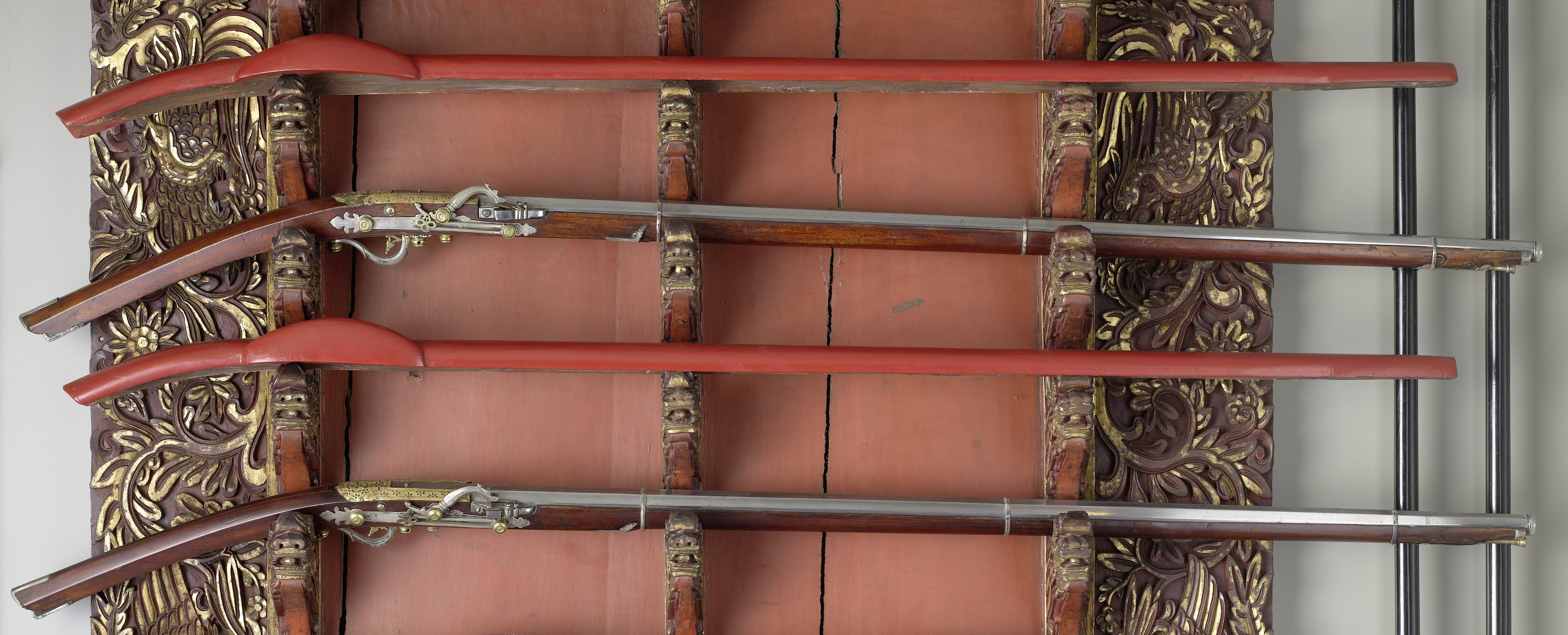
Two Vietnamese arquebuses with their dust cover. From Cornelis Tromp's weapon rack, dated 1650–1679 AD.

Malay and Vietnamese Trịnh soldiers used bamboo covers on their matchlock arquebus barrels and bound them with rattan, to keep them dry when marching in the rain. Vietnamese people also had a smaller piece of bamboo to put over the barrel, to prevent the gun from accumulating dust when it was placed on a weapon rack. The Vietnamese used such arquebus to harass a Spanish fleet off shore in the late 16th century with some success. This gun is similar in form to an istinggar, but has longer buttstock.

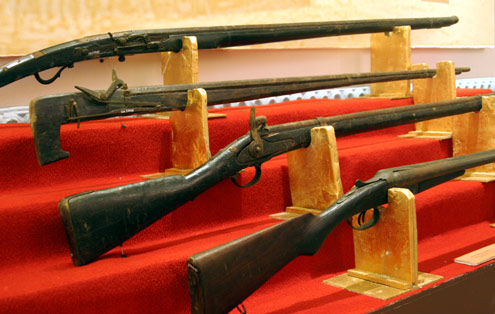
Two Vietnamese matchlock guns (first and second from above).

The Jiaozhi arquebus was not only appreciated by the Chinese, but also highly praised especially by Western observers for its high accuracy from what they saw in the Lê-Mạc and Trịnh-Nguyễn wars. The Ming dynasty also rated Đại Việt arquebus as "the best gun in the world", even surpassing the Ottoman gun, the Japanese gun and the European gun. According to Li Bozhong, former head of the Department of History at Qinghua University:

At the end of the Ming Dynasty, the Annam people developed a matchlock gun with an excellent performance, which the Chinese called "Jiao Chong" (交銃, meaning Jiaozhi gun). Some people think that this kind of gun is superior to the Western and Japanese "Niao Chong" (鳥銃, Bird gun) and "Lu Mi Chong" (魯密銃, Rûm arquebus) in terms of power and performance.

Liu Xianting, who lived at the end of the Ming dynasty, commented:

"Jiaozhi matchlock is the best of the world"

The Đại Việt gun can penetrate several layers of iron armor and can kill from 2 to 5 people with one single bullet while not emitting any loud sounds when fired. A Qing-era record, 南越筆記 (Nányuè bǐjì) linked the Vietnam arquebus with Java arquebus.

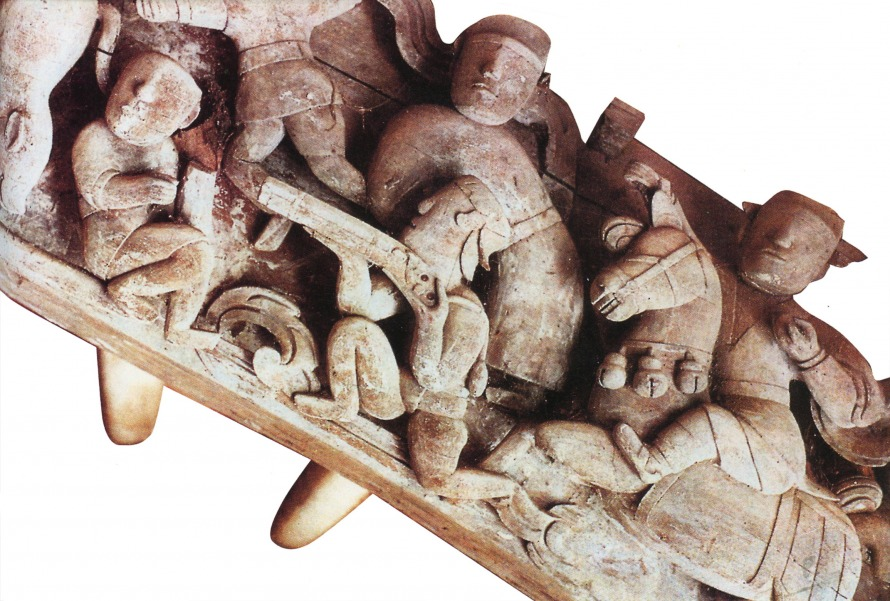
17th century Vietnamese wood relief, showing a kneeling arquebusier.

In the late 17th century AD, the Trịnh army used long muskets, with a barrel length between 1.2–2 m (3 ft 11 in – 6 ft 7 in), resulting in its heavier weight. They were carried on man's back and fired 124 g (4.4 oz) shots. Firing requires a stand, made from a piece of wood from 1.83–2.13 cm (0.72–0.84 in) long.

A gun similar to gingal, with a wooden stand and swivel is also reported:

"One end of the carriage is supported with 2 legs, or a fork of 3 foot high, the other rests on the ground. The gun is placed on the top, where there is an iron socket for the gun to rest in, and a swivel to turn the muzzle in any way. From the breech of the gun there is a short stock for the man who fires the gun to transverse it withal, and to rest it against his shoulder ..."

Even in the late 18th century, Nguyễn musketeers relied on long matchlocks mounted in swivels and three-legged stands.

== See also ==
- Java arquebus
- Istinggar
- Tanegashima (gun)
- Elephant gun
