= Wall gun =

Type of firearm

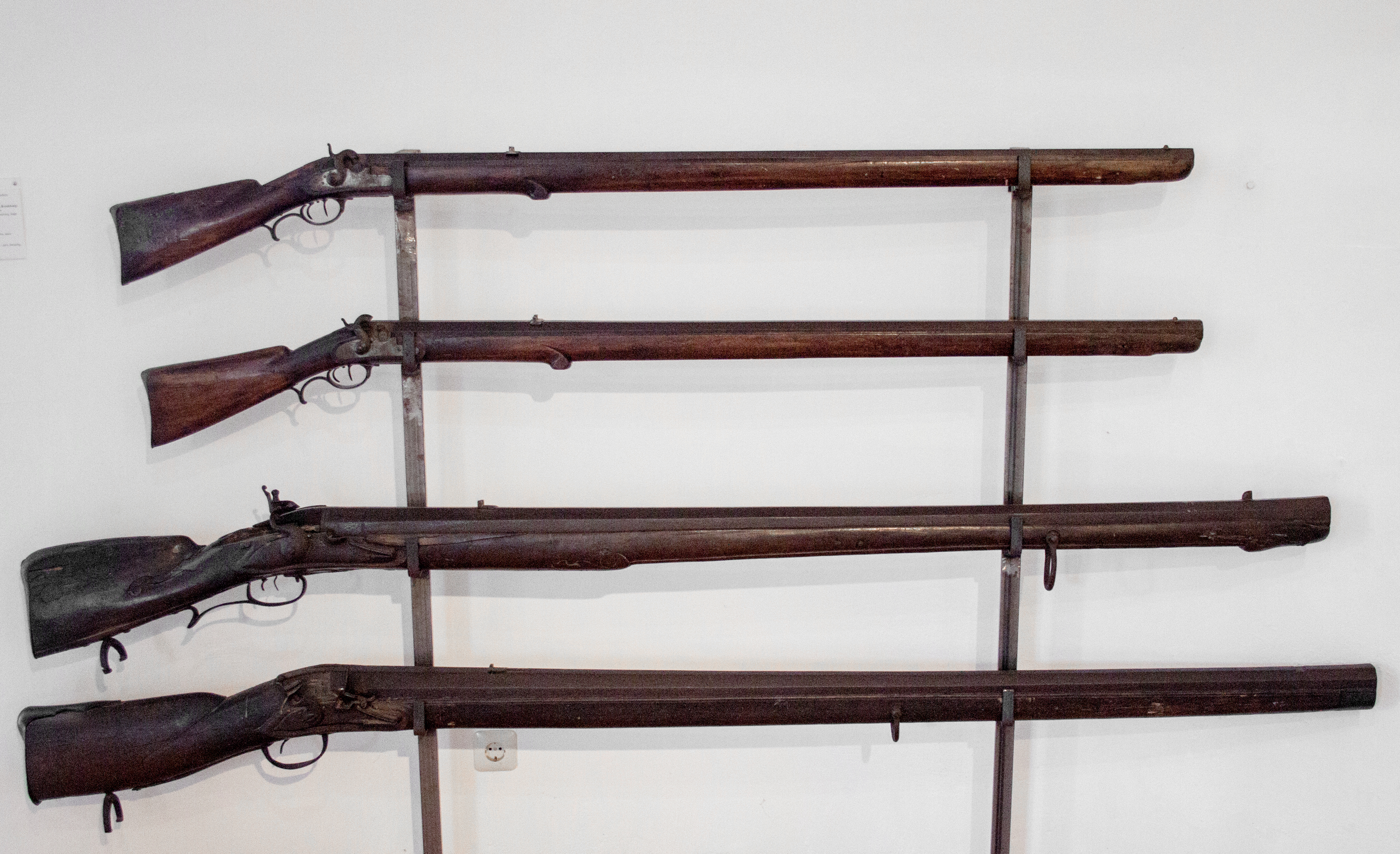
German wall guns (below) and muskets (above).

The wall gun or wall piece was a type of smoothbore firearm used from 16th until 19th centuries by defending forces to break the advance of enemy troops. Essentially, it was a scaled-up version of the army's standard infantry musket, operating under the same principles, but with a bore of up to one-inch (25.4 mm) calibre. These weapons filled a gap in firepower between the musket and the lightest artillery pieces, such as the swivel gun. This sort of weapon may also be found described as a rampart gun, hackbut or amusette, a name originally given to early medieval hand cannon.

== Use ==
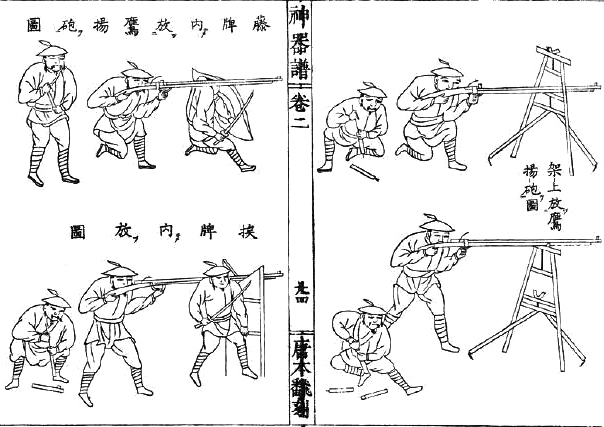
Long matchlock firearm requiring a rest, 16th century, Ming dynasty

Wall pieces were so named because they were designed to be used along the walls of fortifications. They were equipped with a yoke at the point of balance, which tapered into a pivot, which could be inserted into several sockets along the walls, which would absorb the recoil of the piece and also provide a stable gun platform. (In this respect they were much like a scaled-down version of the swivel gun.) Many were fitted with a barrel hook to absorb shock. Some of these weapons had multiple barrels which enabled volleys to be fired much faster than a normal single-shot wall gun. Wall pieces could also be mounted on very light carriages for service in the field, usually in support of the larger guns. They were also used on small naval vessels.

A wall gun's barrel could be over 4.5 feet (140 cm) in length with a bore of at least 1 inch (2.5 cm). This made them more accurate than the standard flintlock or matchlock musket.

George Washington acquired several wall guns during the American War of Independence. Tests showed that they were capable of hitting a sheet of common writing paper at 600 yards (550 m), but as this is comparable angular precision to that of a modern full-bore target rifle these results may be optimistic.

Wall guns were part of the standard equipment of some artillery pieces at that time.

A breech-loading wall gun was issued to the French army in 1819 for the defense of towns. Improved caplock versions were introduced in 1831 and 1842, as were muzzleloading versions. Bolt action wall guns firing metallic cartridges were used in India and China in the late 19th century.

=== Naval use ===
When HMS Espoir captured the Genoese privateer Liguria on 7 August 1798, Espoir's captain, Commander Loftus Otway Bland, catalogued Liguria's armaments as: 12 long 18-pounders, four long 12-pounders, 10 long 6-pounders, 12 long wall-pieces, and four swivel guns. While wall-pieces were stocked similar to a musket, though would often have a forged yoke to help support the gun, and in some cases were rifled. Mentions of wall guns are rare in such enumerations; what is more common are mentions of the "swivel guns".

== Asian wall guns ==
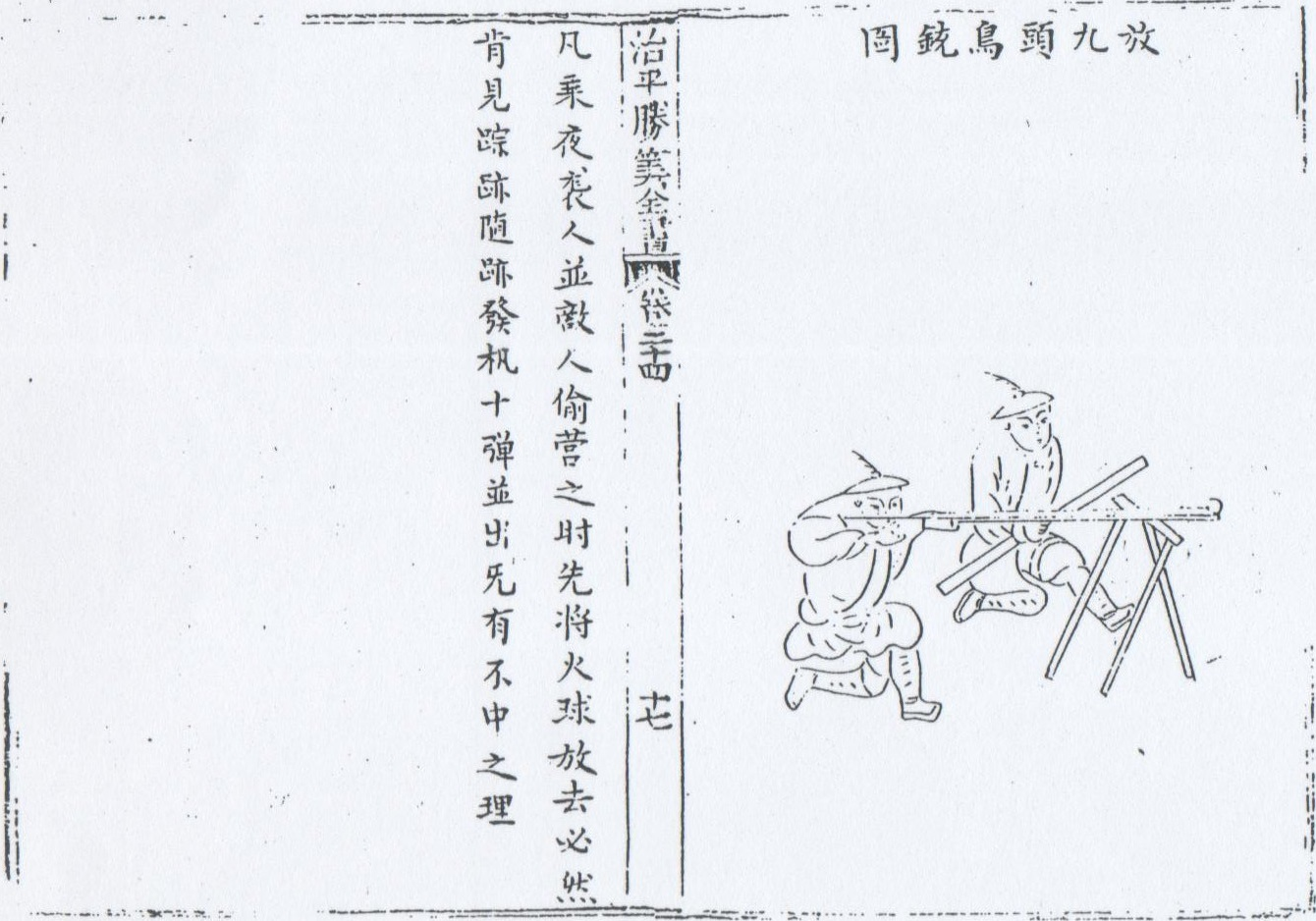
Chinese firing a gingal.

In the Far East, a jingal, gingal or gingall (/ˈdʒɪnɡɔːl/), from Hindi janjal, was a type of large matchlock gun, usually a light piece mounted on a swivel. It fired iron bullets 1.25 inches (3.18 cm) in diameter and was classified as a form of wall gun either by design or use. It sometimes took the form of a heavy musket fired from a rest, and usually required a crew of two men. The weapon was used by the Chinese in the 19th century, such as by the Taiping armies, imperial forces during the Opium Wars, and Chinese rebels in Hong Kong during the Six Day War of 1899.

Wall guns were used in India as early as the 17th century and there is a Burmese source from the late 15th century mentioning the use of "cannon and muskets" by the defenders of the besieged town of Prome. There are examples of later wall guns fitted with bipods. This weapon figures in Kipling's poem "The Grave of the Hundred Head". In Sinhala wall guns were called "Maha Thuwakku" and the Kingdom of Kandy used tripod-mounted guns to defend the city of Kandy and the Royal Palace.

Wall guns were used innovatively by Nader Shah and his elite jazayerchi, who would ride horses into position and dismount to fire in a fashion similar to a dragoon. Their version of the jezail often included a bipod to facilitate the use of the heavy weapon.

== Gallery ==
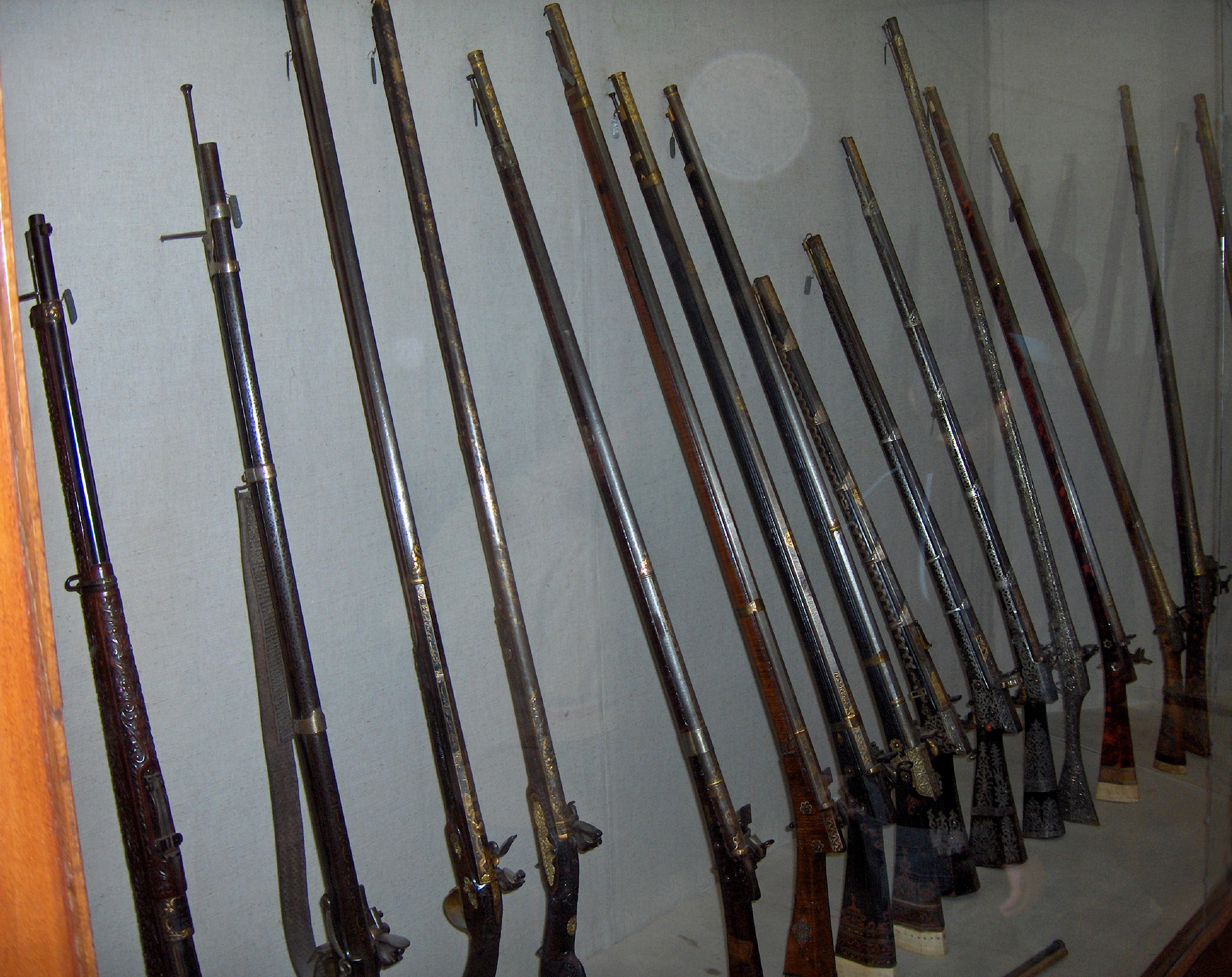
Turkish wall guns, Shishane, carbines and muskets.

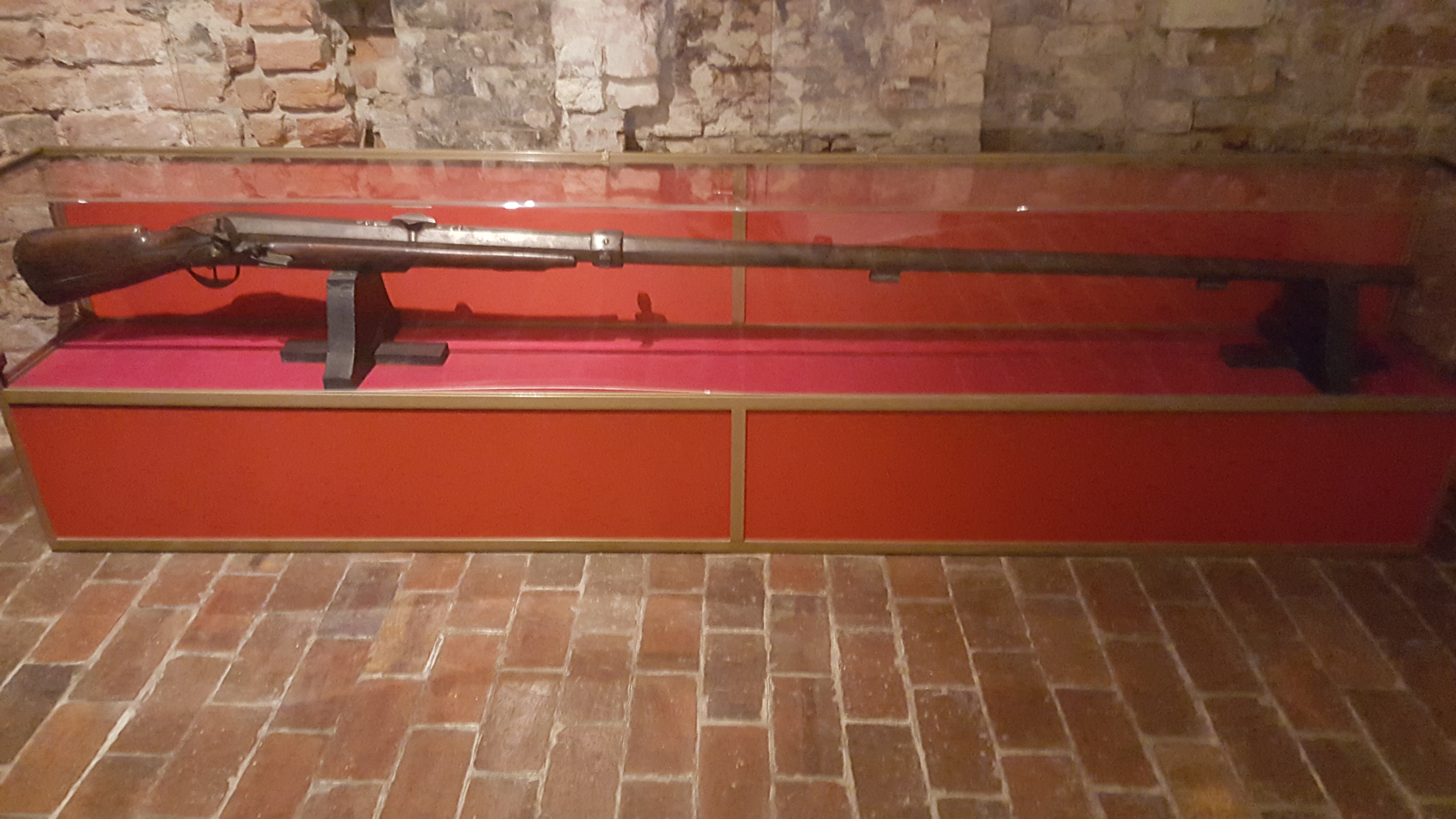
Polish wall gun from the 18th century.

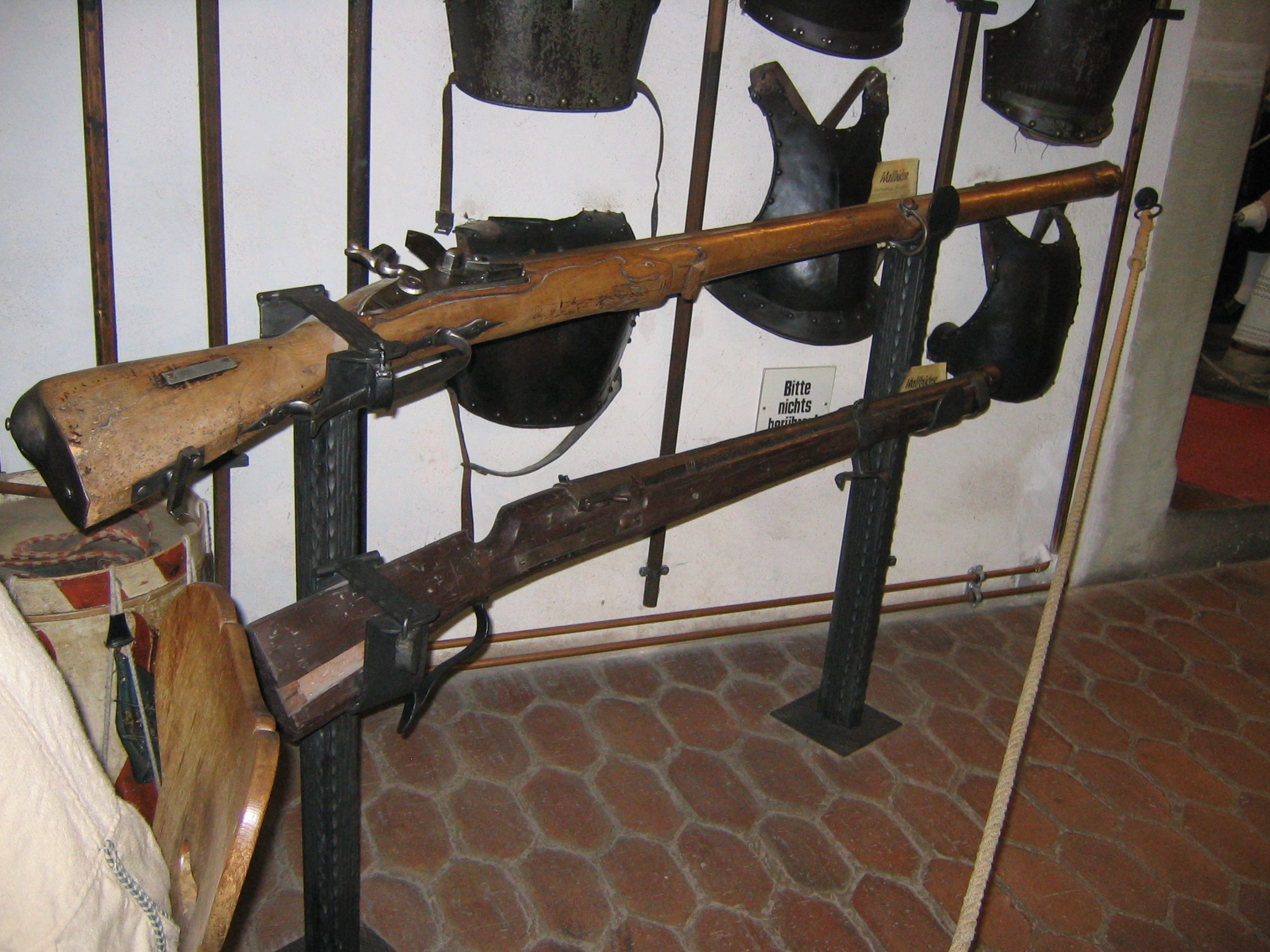
17th century flintlock wall gun from Germany.

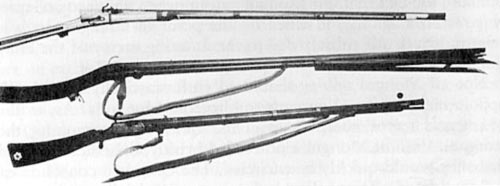
Chinese wall gun (centre) with bipod.

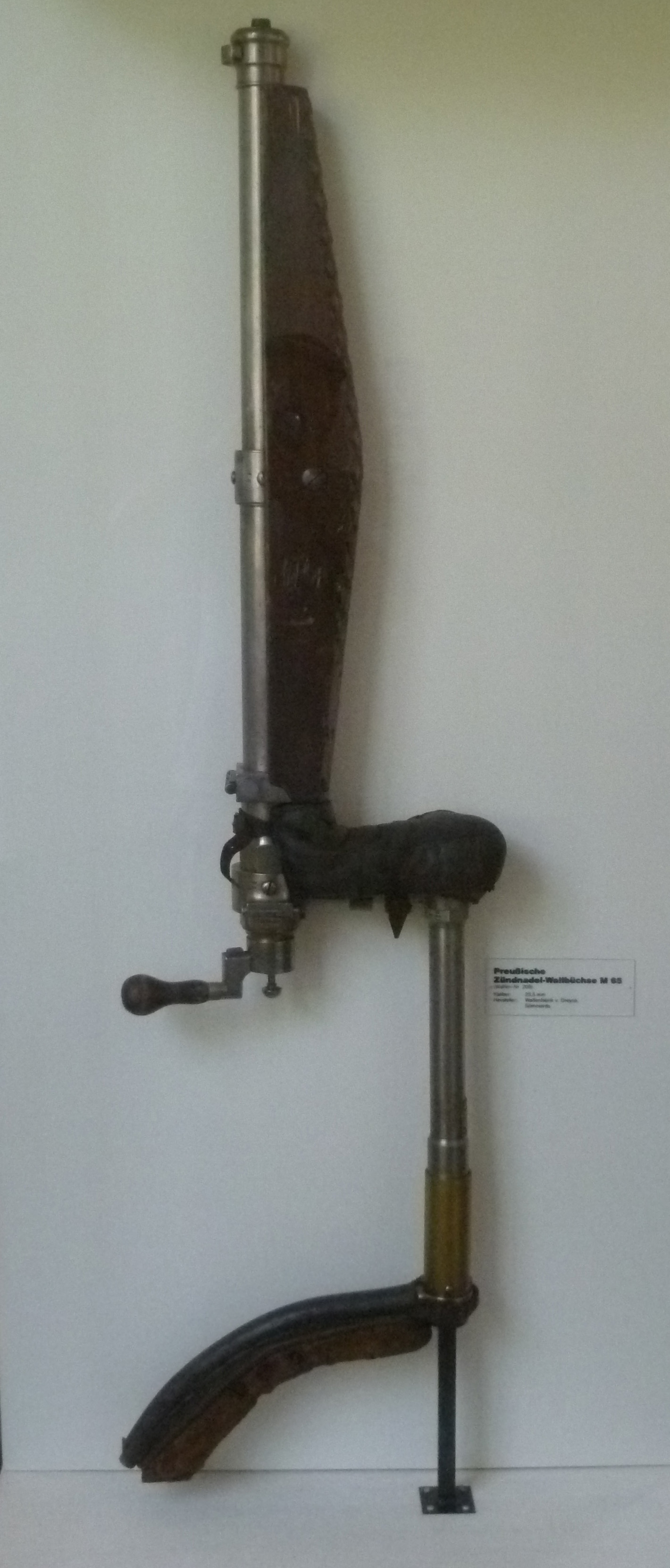
Experimental needle fire wall gun.

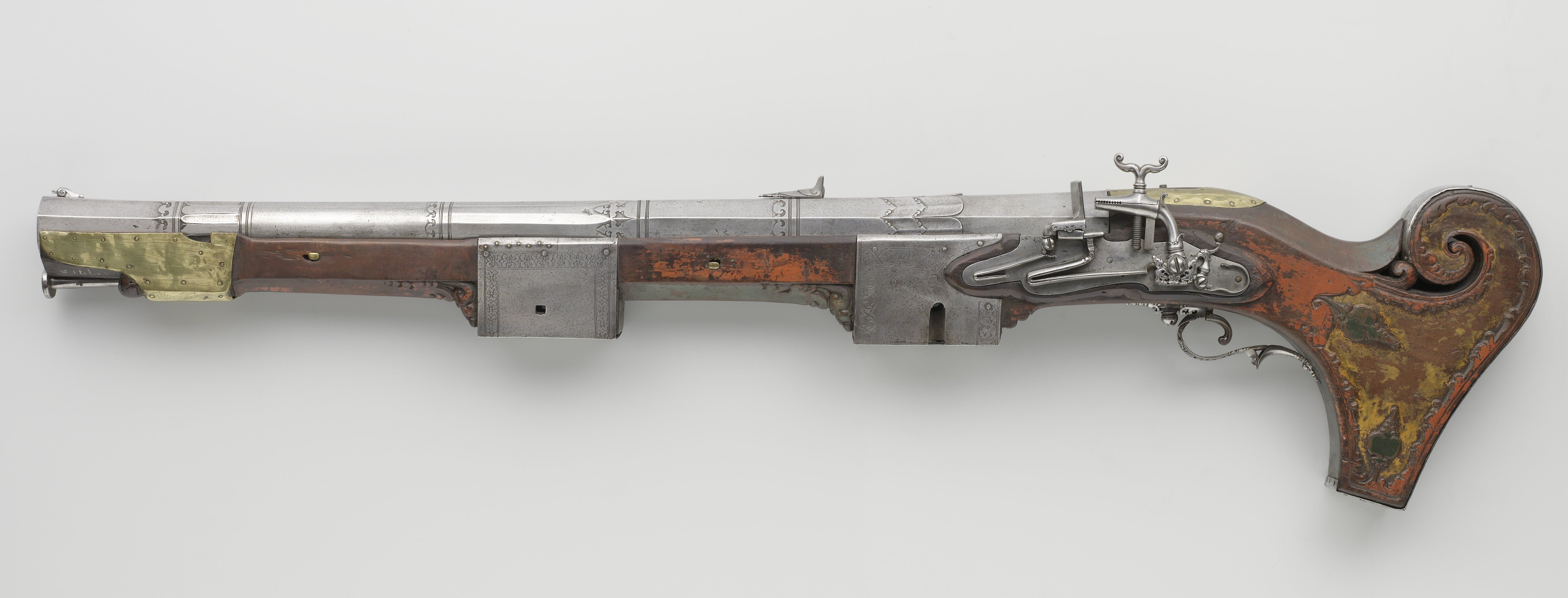
Heavily decorated 16th century wall gun from the Kingdom of Kandy

== See also ==
- List of firearms before the 20th century
- Zamburak
- Java arquebus
- Jiaozhi arquebus
- Istinggar
- Punt gun
- Volley gun
- Organ gun
- Recoilless rifle
- Anti-tank rifle
- Anti-materiel rifle

== Bibliography ==
- Perrett, Bryan (2000). Gunboat!. Cassel & Co. p. 39. ISBN 0-304-35670-0.
