= Bedil tombak =

Early firearm from Malay archipelago

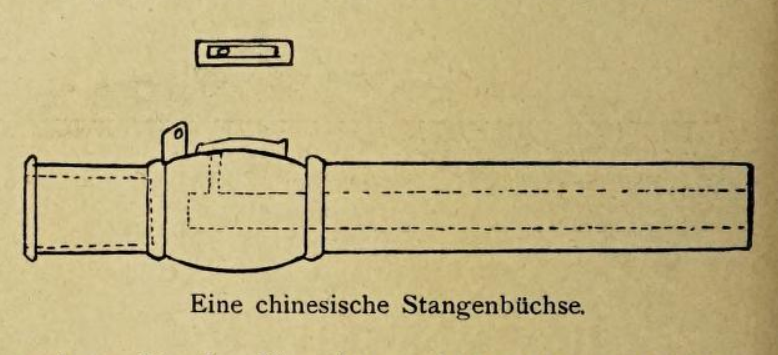
Drawing of a Chinese pole gun found in Java, 1421 CE. It weighed 2.252 kg, length of 357 mm, and caliber of 16 mm. The ignition pan is rectangular, 28 mm long and 3 mm wide. The ignition hole is 4 mm in diameter, formerly protected by a cover, which is now missing, only the hinge is still preserved.

Bedil tombak or bedil tumbak is a type of early firearm from the Indonesian archipelago. The weapon consists of a gun or small cannon mounted on a wooden pole, forming a type of weapon known as "pole gun" (stangenbüchse in German).

== Etymology ==
The word bedil is a term in the Malay and Javanese language meaning gun (any type of gun, from small pistol to large siege gun). The word tombak or tumbak means spear, pike, or lance.

== History ==
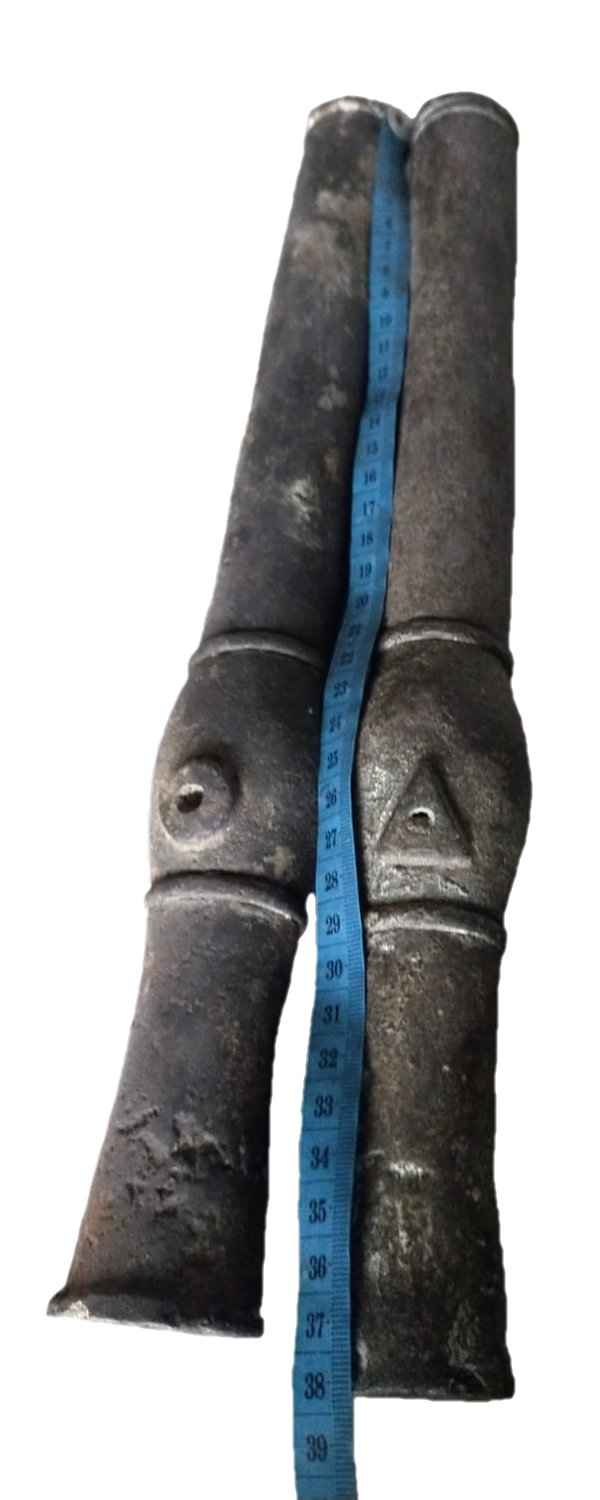
Majapahit-era hand cannons from Mojokerto, East Java.

The introduction of gunpowder-based weapons in the Nusantara archipelago can be traced back to the Mongol invasion of Java (1293), where the Chinese-Mongol troops used cannon (炮—Pào) against the forces of Kediri in Daha. Between the 14th–15th century, there are local sources mentioned about bedil (gun or gunpowder-based weapon), but since this is a broad term caution must be taken to identify what type of weapon used in a passage. A small hand-gun dated from the year 1340 thought to be Chinese was found in Java, but the dating may have been wrong.

Ma Huan (Zheng He's translator) visited Majapahit in 1413 and took notes about the local customs. His book, Yingya Shenlan, explained about Javanese marriage ceremony: when the husband was escorting his new wife to the marital home, various instruments were sounded, including gongs, drums, and huochong (fire-tube or hand cannon). It is probable that the Javanese hand cannon is modeled after Chinese ones. A Chinese pole cannon from 1421 A.D. has been found in the island of Java bearing the name of Emperor Yongle (1403–1425). The gun's ignition hole is protected from the rain by a cover connected with a hinge.

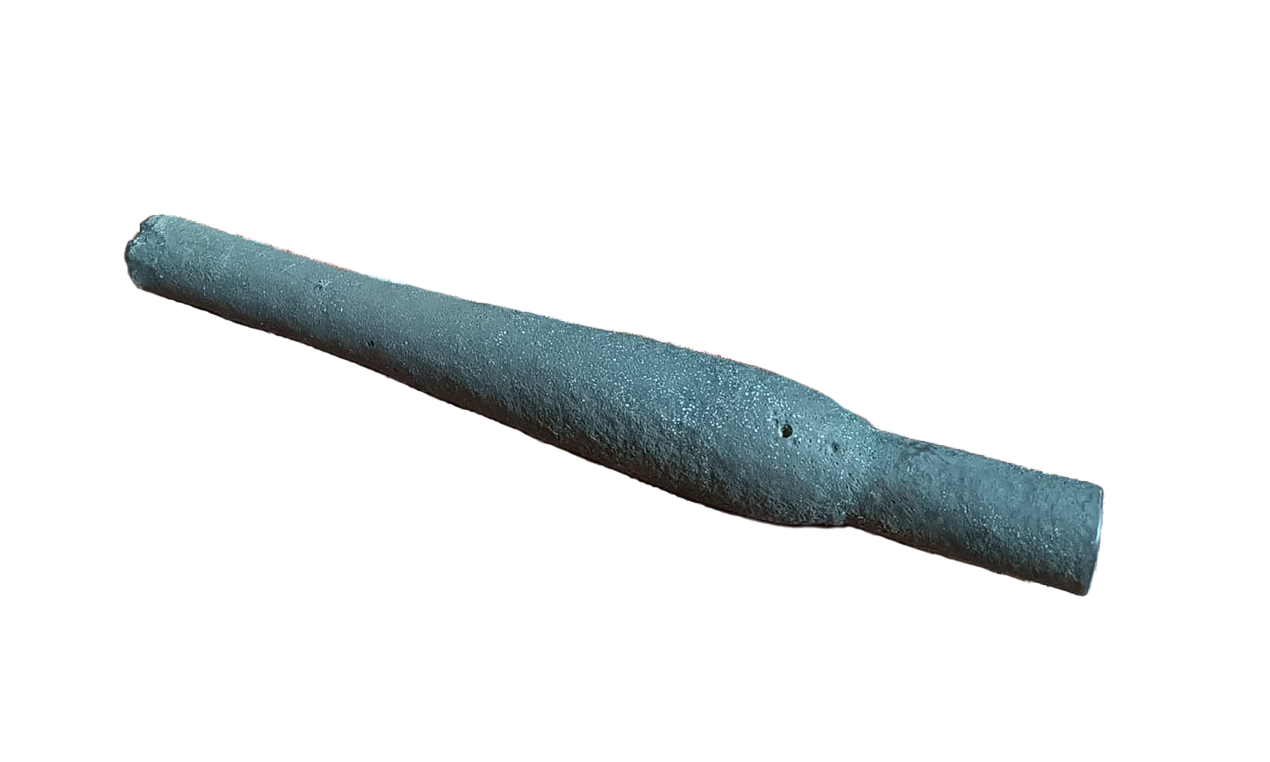
Small Javanese hand cannon, age unknown.

Haiguo Guangji (海国广记) and Shuyu zhouzi lu (殊域周咨錄) recorded that Java is vast and densely populated, and their armored soldiers and hand cannons (火銃—huǒ chòng) dominated the Eastern Seas.

Duarte Barbosa recorded the abundance of gunpowder-based weapons in Java ca. 1514. The Javanese were deemed as expert gun casters and good artillerymen. The weapon made there include one-pounder cannons, long muskets, spingarde (arquebus), schioppi (hand cannon), Greek fire, guns (cannons), and other fire-works. In the 1511 siege of Malacca, the Malays were using cannons, matchlock guns, and "firing tubes". The gunpowder weapons of Malacca were not made by the Malay people but were imported from Java.

Local babad (historical text) of the post-17th century occasionally mention bedil tombak. In Lombok example of such babads were babad Lombok, babad Mengui, and babad Sakra. They are also mentioned in Sundanese and Balinese texts. During the Bali-Lombok war (ca. early 19th century–end of 19th century), a part of Karangasem troops were armed with bedil tombak.

== Gallery ==
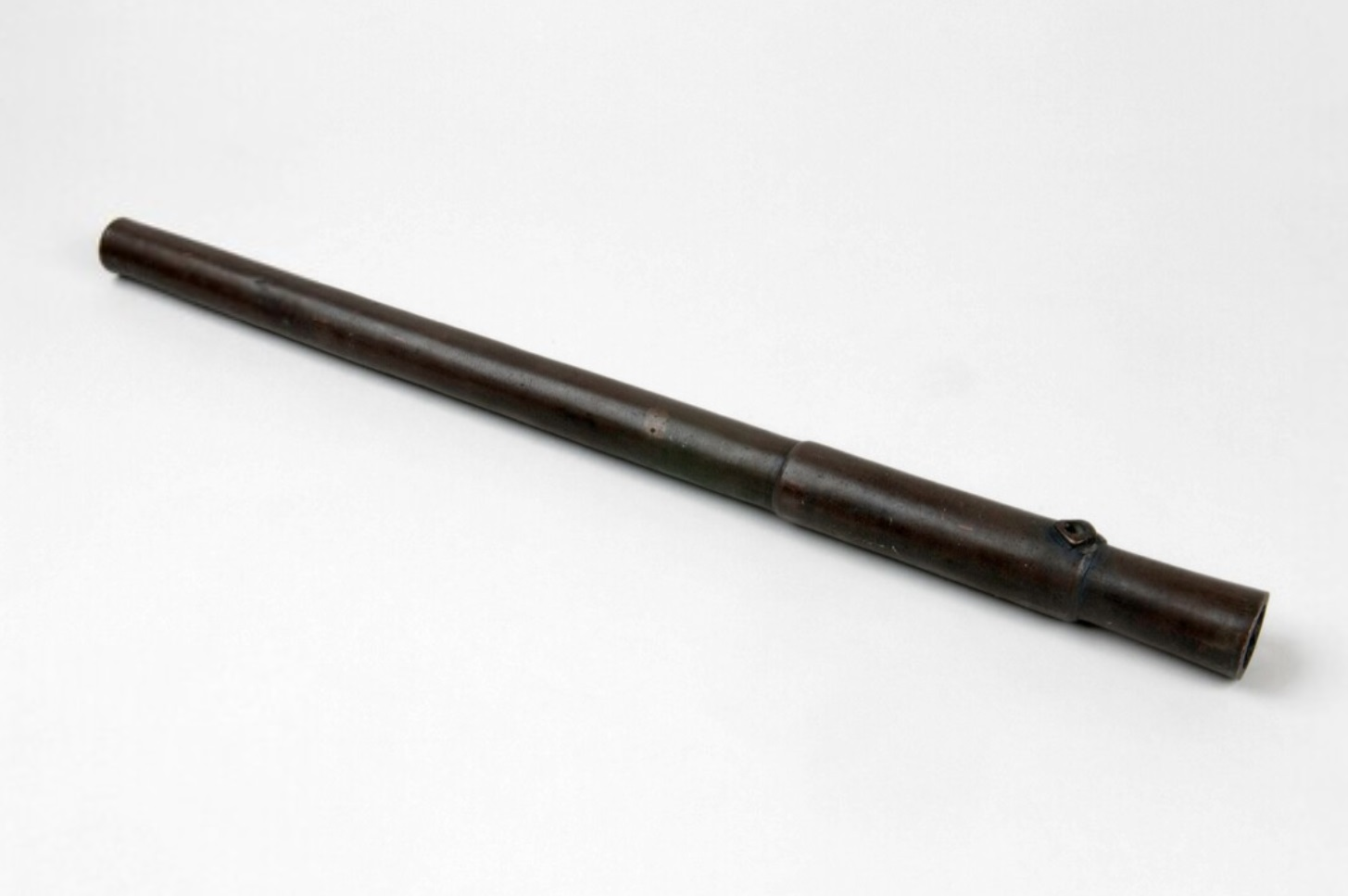
Bronze bedil tombak, age and specific place unknown.

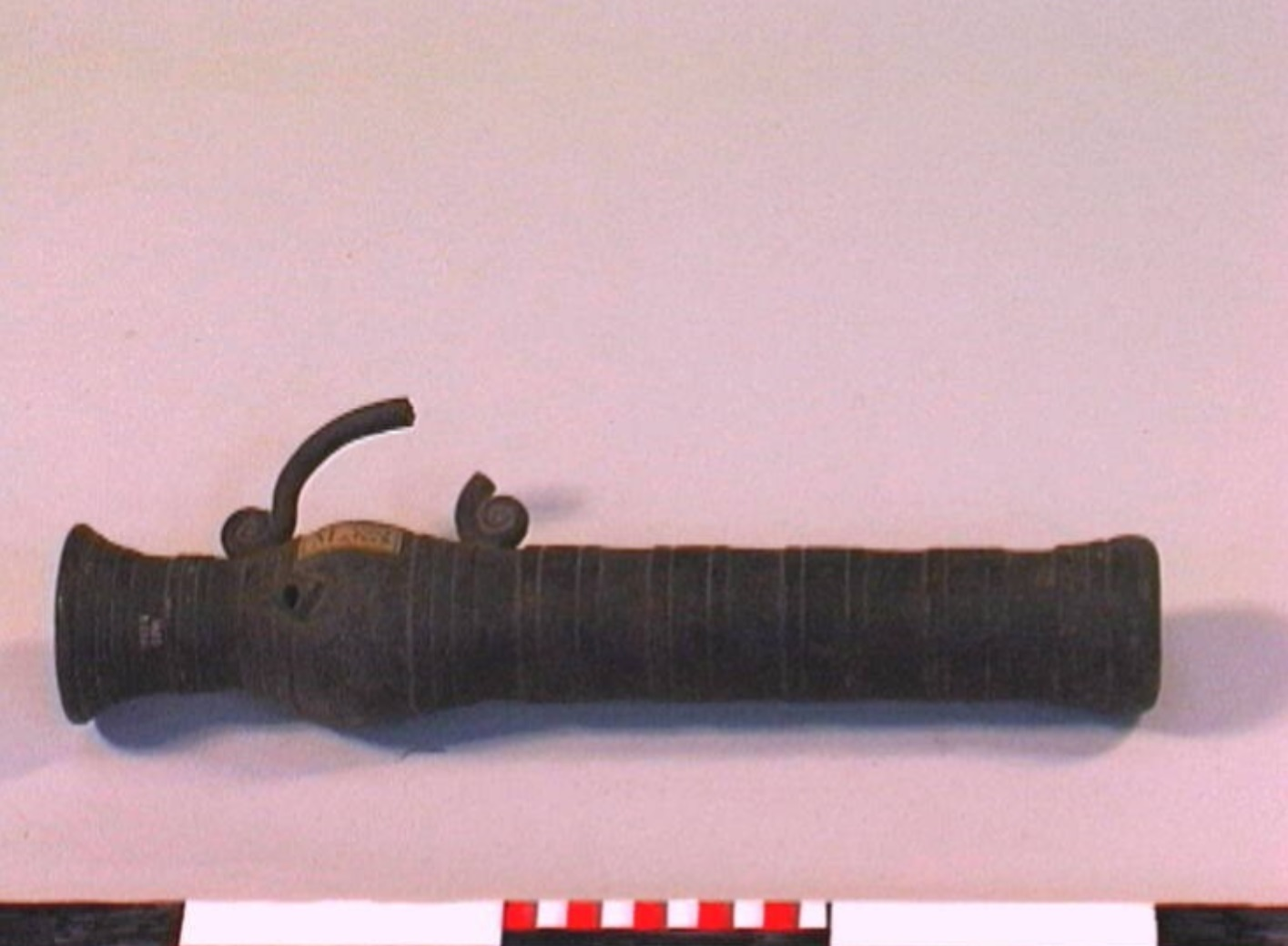
Javan iron bedil tombak from Majalengka, West Java, age unknown.

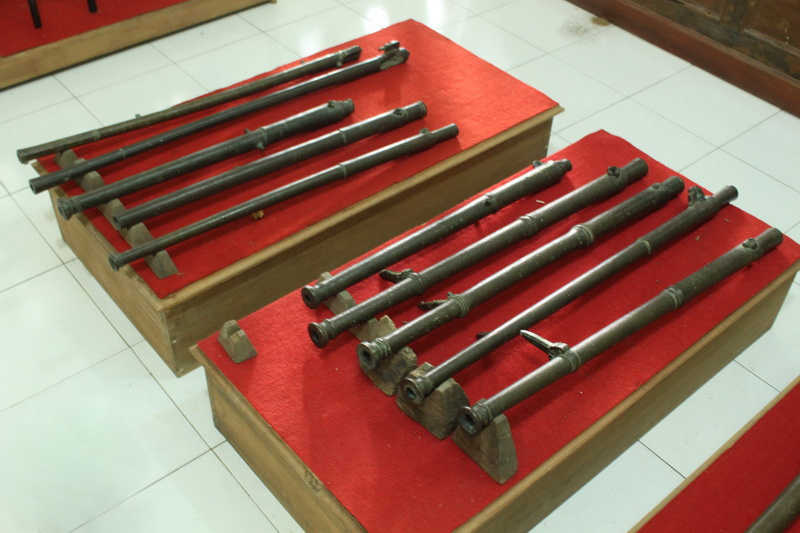
Bedil tombak and swivel guns at Talaga Manggung Museum, West Java.

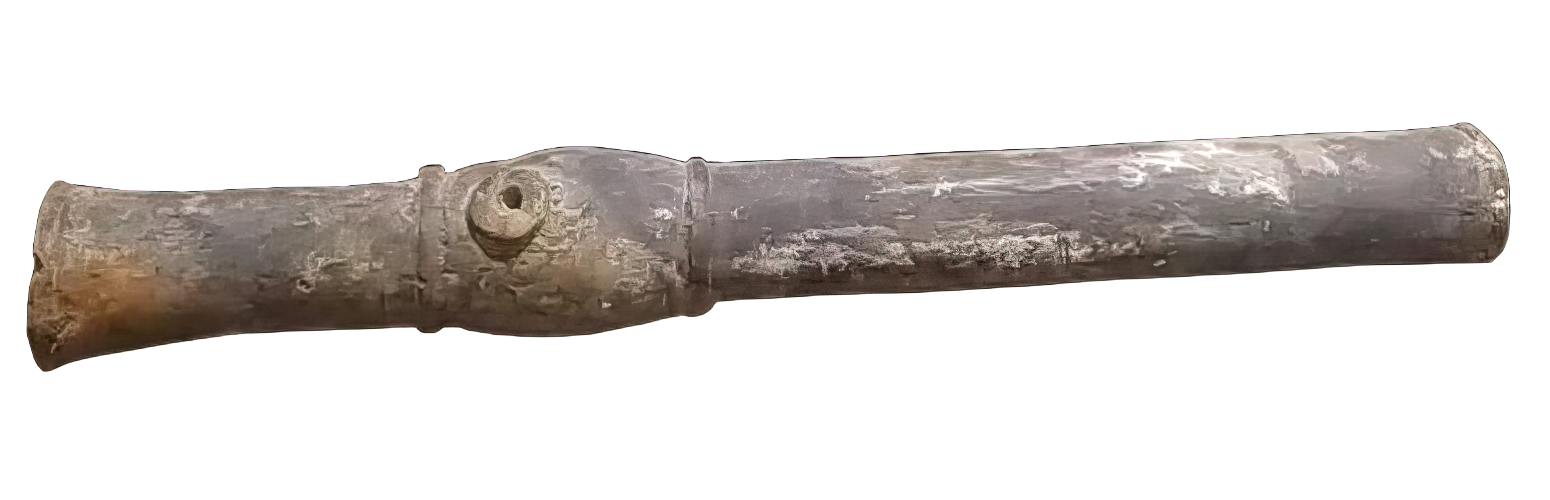
A bedil (or cetbang), recovered from the Brantas River, Jombang, East Java.

== See also ==
- Harpoon cannon
- Speargun
- Handgonne
- Java arquebus
- Istinggar
- Bedil (term)
