= Java arquebus =

Long arquebus or musket from Java

19th-century Indonesian matchlock, this weapon is smaller and shorter than the Java arquebus.

A Java arquebus (Indonesian and Malaysian: Bedil Jawa) is a long-barreled early firearm from the Nusantara archipelago, dating back to the early 16th century. The weapon was used by Javanese armies, albeit in low number compared to total fighting men, before the arrival of Iberian explorers (Portuguese and Spaniards) in the 16th century. In historical records, the weapon may be classified as arquebus or musket. (Note: Musket originally refers to a heavier variant of the arquebus, capable of penetrating heavy armor (see Arnold, 2001, The Renaissance at War, p. 75–78). Java arquebus is larger than ordinary arquebus and has good penetration ability.)

== Etymology ==
The term "Java arquebus" is a translation of the Chinese word 爪哇銃 (Zua Wa Chong) or 瓜哇銃 (Gua Wa Chong). In the local language the weapon was known by various names, bedil or bedhil is more commonly used. However, this term has a broad meaning — it may refer to various types of firearms and gunpowder weapons, from small pistols to large siege guns. The term bedil comes from wedil (or wediyal) and wediluppu (or wediyuppu) in the Tamil language. In its original form, these words refer to gunpowder blast and saltpeter, respectively. But after being absorbed into bedil in the Malay language, and in a number of other cultures in the archipelago, that Tamil vocabulary is used to refer to all types of weapons that use gunpowder. In Javanese and Balinese the term bedil and bedhil is known, in Sundanese the term is bedil, in Batak it is known as bodil, in Makasarese, badili, in Buginese, balili, in Dayak language, badil, in Tagalog, baril, in Bisayan, bádil, in Bikol languages, badil, and Malay people call it badel or bedil.

== History ==
The knowledge of making gunpowder-based weapons in the Nusantara archipelago has been known after the failed Mongol invasion of Java (1293 A.D.). Pole gun (bedil tombak) was recorded as being used by Java in 1413. However the knowledge of making "true" firearms came much later, after the middle of 15th century. It was brought by the Islamic nations of West Asia, most probably the Arabs. The precise year of introduction is unknown, but it may be safely concluded to be no earlier than 1460.

=== Java ===
The Majapahit Empire pioneered the use of the gunpowder-based weapon in the Nusantara archipelago. One account mentions the use of firearm in a battle against Giri forces circa 1500–1506:

... wadya Majapahit ambedili, dene wadya Giri pada pating jengkelang ora kelar nadhahi tibaning mimis ...

... Majapahit troops shooting their firearms (bedil: firearm), while Giri troops fell dead because they couldn't withstand being pierced by bullets (mimis: ball bullet)...

—Serat Darmagandhul

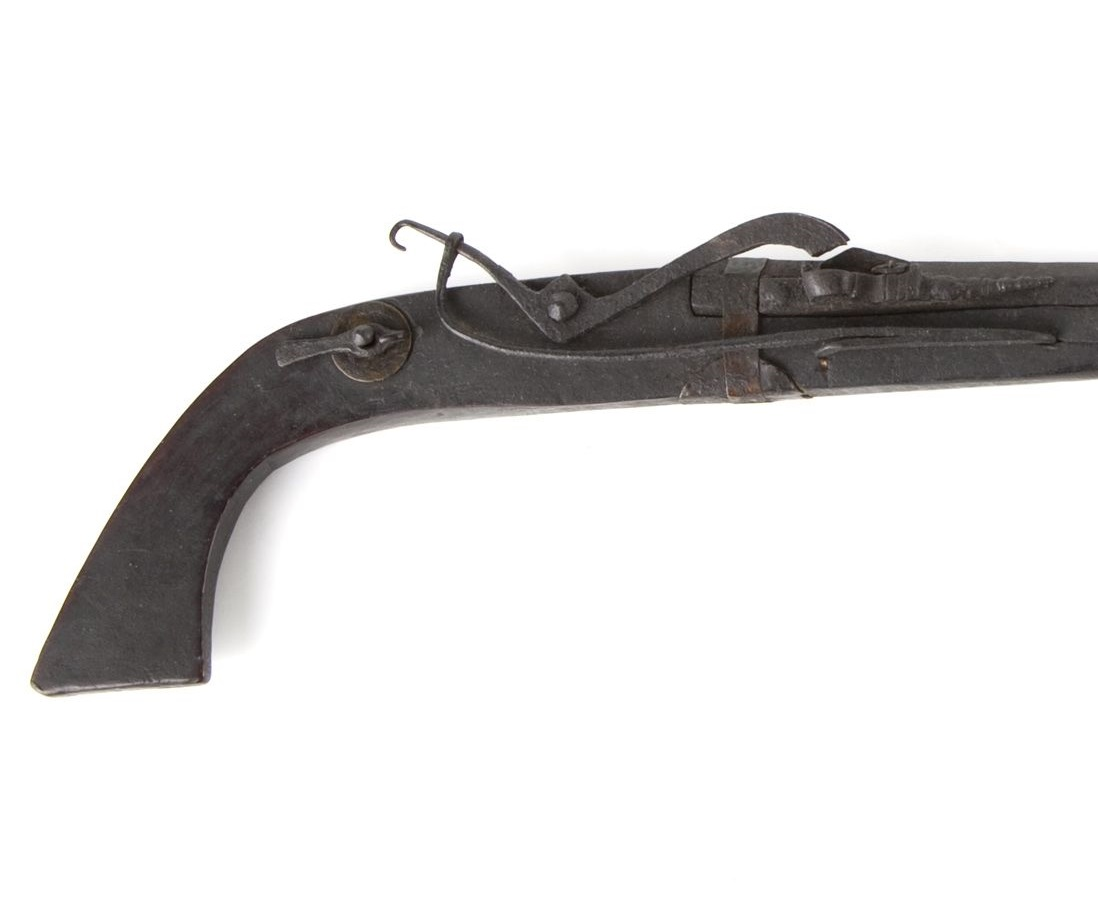
Detail of the firing mechanism.

This type of arquebus has similarity to the Vietnamese arquebus of the 17th century. The weapon is very long, it may reach 2.2 m (7 ft 3 in) in length. Tome Pires' 1513 account tells the army of Gusti Pati (Patih Udara), viceroy of Batara Vojyaya (probably Brawijaya or Ranawijaya), numbered 200,000 men, 2,000 of which are horsemen and 4,000 musketeers. Duarte Barbosa ca. 1514 said that the inhabitants of Java are great masters in casting artillery and very good artillerymen. They make many one-pounder cannons (cetbang or rentaka), long muskets, spingarde (arquebus), schioppi (hand cannon), Greek fire, guns (cannons), and other fire-works. Every place are considered excellent in casting artillery, and in the knowledge of using it.

The Chinese praised the Southern country gun:

Liuxianting (劉獻廷—early Qing era geographer) from the Ming and Qing dynasty says: "Southern people are good at gun warfare, and Southern gun is the best under the heavens". Qu Dajun (屈大均) said: "Southern gun, especially the Javanese gun (爪哇銃) is likened to a strong crossbow. They are suspended from their shoulders with ropes, and they will be sent together when they meet the enemy. They can penetrate several heavy armors".

The Chinese Ming dynasty recorded exports products of Java that were imported to China. These include pepper, sandalwood incense, ivory, horse, iron guns, black slaves, balahu chuan (叭喇唬船—perahu), zhaowa chong (爪哇銃—Javanese gun), and sulfur. The Java gun was preferred by the Ming army because of its flexibility and high accuracy—it was said that the gun can be used to snipe birds. Guangdong Tongzhi (廣東通志), which was compiled as early as 1535, recorded that Java's armored soldiers and guns are the best amongst the Eastern people. The Javanese people use it very skillfully and can accurately hit sparrows. The Chinese also use it. It could break fingers, a palm, and an arm if not used with caution.

=== Malay peninsula ===
The Portuguese found various gunpowder weapons after the 1511 conquest of Malacca. It is known that the Malays of Malacca obtained arms from Java. Despite having a lot of artillery and firearms, the weapons were mostly and mainly purchased from the Javanese and Gujarati, where the Javanese and Gujarati were the operators of the weapons. In the early 16th century, prior to the Portuguese arrival, the Malays were a people who lacked firearms. The Malay chronicle, Sejarah Melayu, mentioned that in 1509 they did not understand “why bullets killed”, indicating their unfamiliarity with using firearms in battle, if not in ceremony. Lendas da India by Gaspar Correia and Asia Portuguesa by Manuel de Faria y Sousa confirmed Sejarah Melayu's account. Both recorded a similar story, although not as spectacular as described in Sejarah Melayu.

Wan Mohd Dasuki Wan Hasbullah explained several facts about the existence of gunpowder weapons in Malacca and other Malay states before the arrival of the Portuguese:

1. No evidence showed that guns, cannons, and gunpowder were made in Malay states.
2. No evidence showed that guns were ever used by the Malacca Sultanate before the Portuguese attack, even from Malay sources themselves.
3. Based on the majority of cannons reported by the Portuguese, the Malays preferred small artillery.

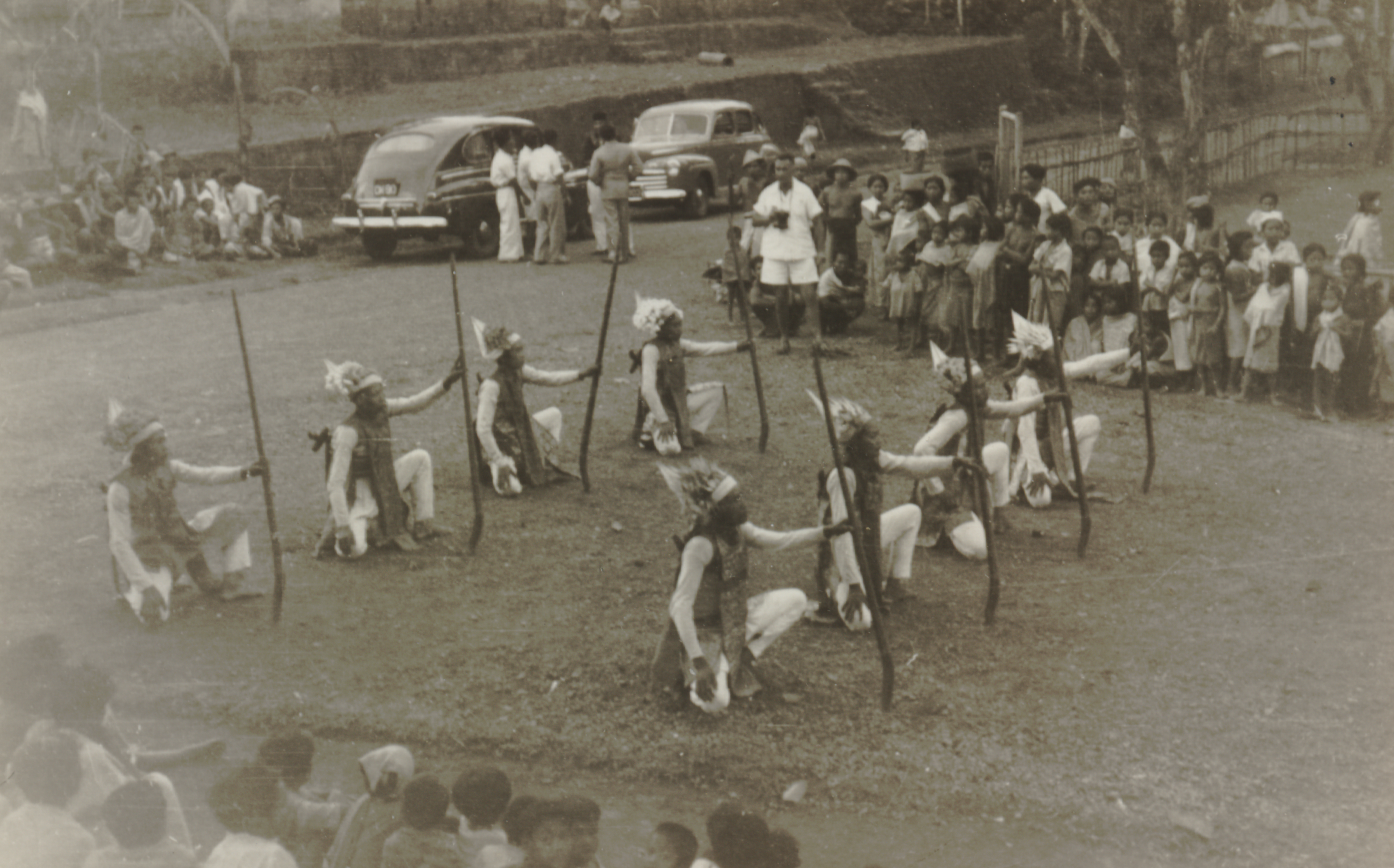
A Baris Bedil (gun dance) performance in Bali, Indonesia.

In The Commentaries of the Great Afonso Dalboquerque "large matchlock" (Note: Written as espingardões (plural) or espingardão (singular).) is frequently mentioned throughout the book. During the first attack of Malacca the approaching Portuguese were shot at by the Moors (muslims) of Malacca:

Two hours before the break of day Afonso Dalboquerque ordered the trumpet to be blown, in order to awaken them, and they embarked immediately with all the rest of the men-at-arms and went on board his ship, and when a general confession had been made, all set out together and came to the mouth of the river just as morning broke, and attacked the bridge, each battalion in the order which had been assigned to it. Then the Moors began to fire upon them with their artillery, which was posted in the stockades, and with their large matchlocks wounded some of our men.

They are also used when the Portuguese were withdrawing in the first attack:

When the Moors perceived that they were withdrawing, they began to open fire with large matchlocks, arrows, and blowing-tubes, and wounded some of our men, yet with all the haste they made Afonso Dalboquerque ordered the men to carry off with them fifty large bombards (Note: Bombard is a type of short, large calibre cannon. The Malays of Malacca has bombards which threw leaden shot as large as an espera — a large old kind of artillery. See Birch 1875, p. 121.) that had been captured in the stockades upon the bridge

Joao de Barros described a scene of the conquest in Da Asia:

As soon as the junk had passed the sand-bank and had come to an anchor, a short way from the bridge, the Moorish artillery opened a fire on her. Some guns discharged leadballs at intervals, which passed through both sides of the vessel, doing much execution among the crew. In the heat of the action Antonio d'Abreu, the commander, was struck in the cheek from a fusil (espingardão), carrying off the greater number of his teeth.

The matchlocks that shoot through both sides of their vessel, had very long barrel and were 18 mm in caliber.

Historian Fernão Lopes de Castanheda mentions matchlocks (espingardão—large espingarda / arquebus), he says that they threw balls, some of stone, and some of iron covered with lead. The son of Afonso de Albuquerque mentioned the armament of Malacca: There are large matchlocks, poisoned blowing tubes, bows, arrows, armour-plated dresses (laudeis de laminas), Javanese lances, and other sorts of weapons. After Malacca was taken by the Portuguese, they captured 3000 of the 5000 muskets which had been furnished from Java.

Afonso de Albuquerque compared Malaccan gun founders as being on the same level as those of Germany. However, he did not state what ethnicity the Malaccan gun founders were. Duarte Barbosa stated that the arquebus-maker of Malacca was Javanese. The Javanese also manufactured their own cannon in Malacca. The Javanese handled much of the productive work in Malacca before 1511 and in 17th century Pattani.

=== Indochina ===
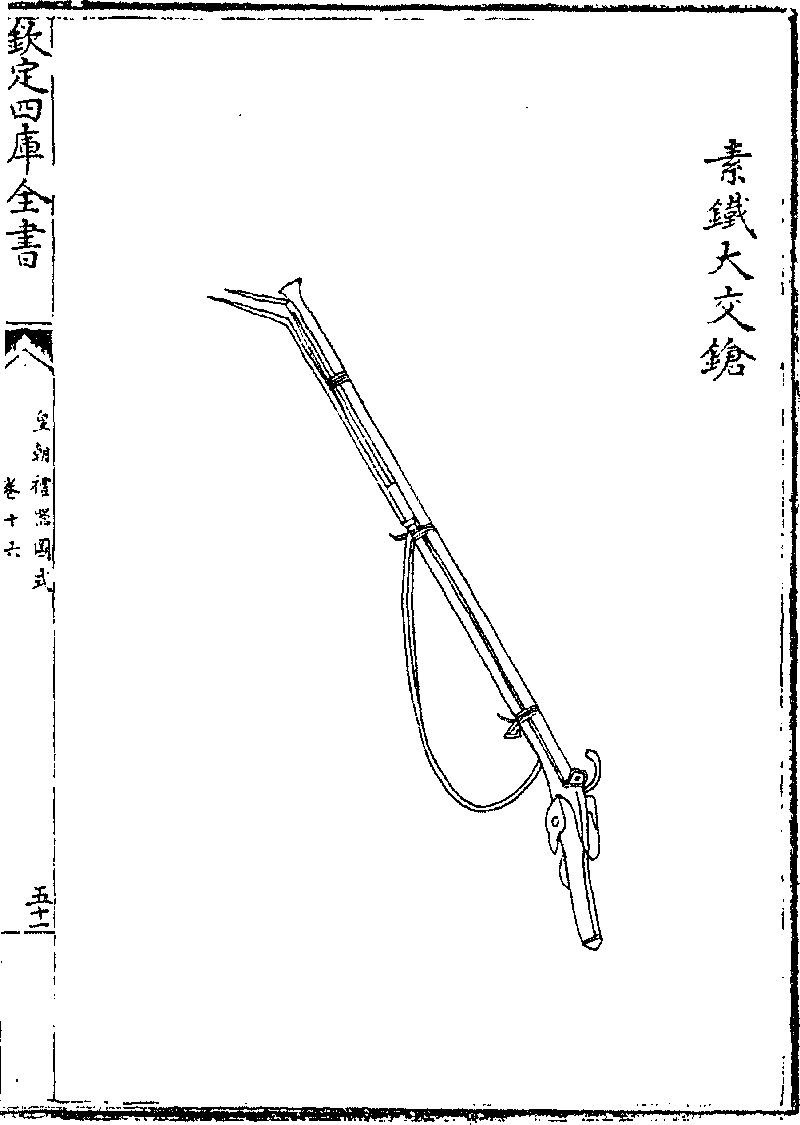
Jiaozhi arquebus of 1739. Note the simple mechanism.

Đại Việt was considered by the Ming to have produced particularly advanced matchlocks during the 16–17th century, surpassing even Ottoman, Japanese, and European firearms. European observers of the Lê–Mạc War and later Trịnh–Nguyễn War also noted the proficiency of matchlock making by the Vietnamese. The Vietnamese matchlock was said to have been able to pierce several layers of iron armour, kill two to five men in one shot, yet also fire quietly for a weapon of its caliber. The Chinese called this weapon Jiao Chong (交銃, lit. Jiaozhi Arquebus), and noted its similarity to Zhua Wa Chong/Java arquebus. (Note: The Vietnamese (Jiaozhi) arquebus may refer to several kind of matchlock weapon: Arquebus in the model of istinggar, arquebus with bipod under the barrel, arquebus with tripod and swivel mount, and jingal-styled arquebus. See Jiaozhi arquebus.)

== See also ==
- Bedil
- Bedil tombak
- Elephant gun
- History of gunpowder
- Istinggar
- Punt gun
- Tanegashima (gun)
- Timeline of the gunpowder age
- Vietnam arquebus
