= Li Bozhong =

Chinese economic historian

Li Bozhong (Chinese: 李伯重; born 10 October 1949) is a Chinese economic historian and a Chair Professor of Humanities at Peking University and Chair Professor Emeritus at Hong Kong University of Science and Technology and Tsinghua University.

== Early year and education ==
Li was born in Kunming, Yunnan, a province in Southwest China, on 10 October 1949. His father Li Shan (李埏) was also a historian specializing in Song dynasty. Due to the Culture Revolution (1966-1976), Li Bozhong could not go to the college after graduating from high school until 1978.

Li received his MA (1981) and PhD (1985) in History from Xiamen University. From 1991 to 1992, Li was a postdoctoral fellow at the University of Michigan.

== Academic career ==
Li was a postdoctoral researcher at University of Michigan from 1992 to 1993.

He joined the faculty of Peking University in 2017.

== Works ==
- Li, B. (2021) An Early Modern Economy in China: The Yangzi Delta in the 1820s. Cambridge University Press.
- Li, B. (1998) Agricultural development in Jiangnan, 1620-1850. Springer.
