= Dragon (firearm) =

Short version of a blunderbuss

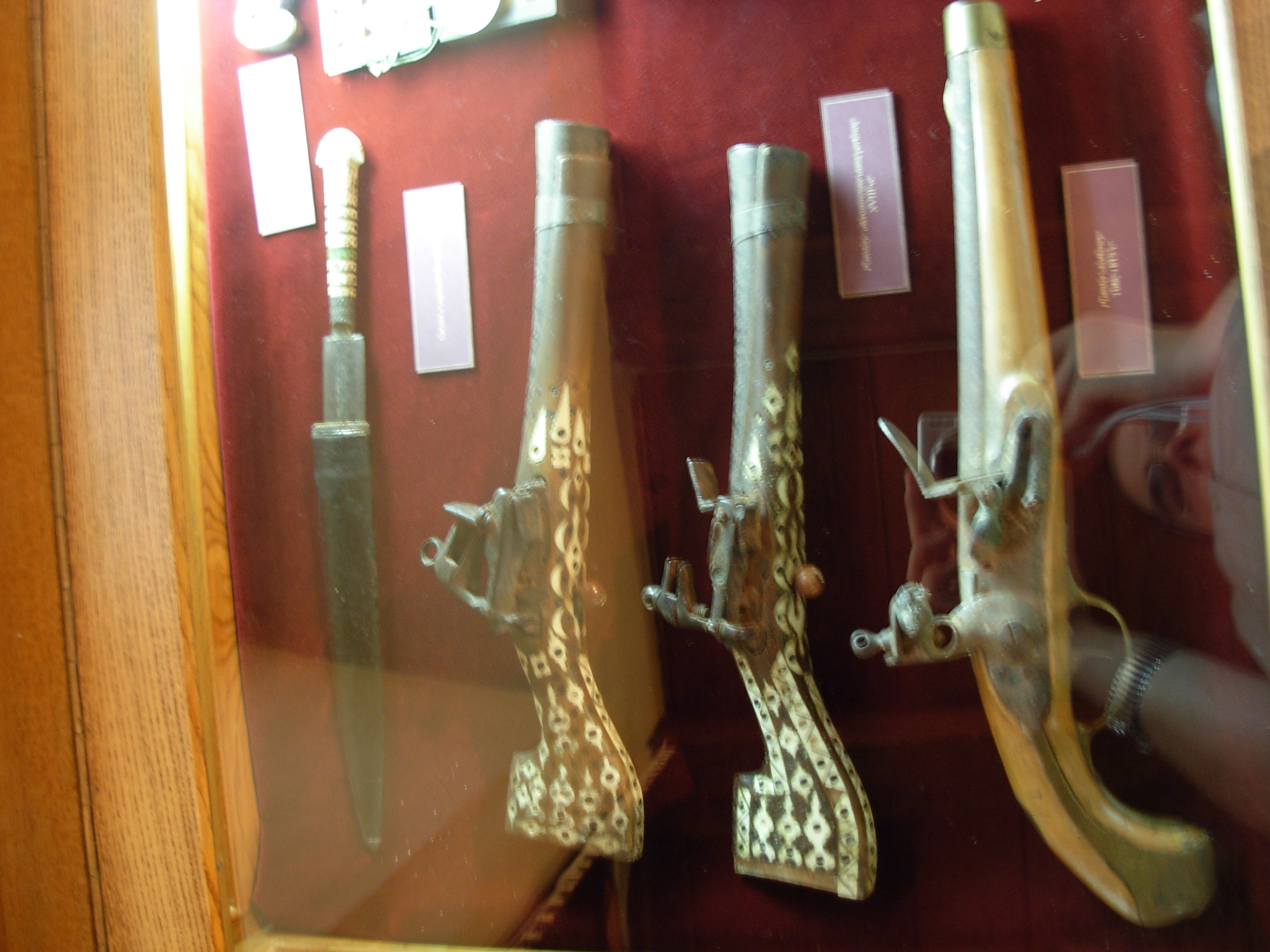
A pair of early dragons from Poland fitted with the miquelet lock

A dragon is a shortened version of blunderbuss, a firearm with a short, large caliber barrel which is flared at the muzzle and frequently throughout the entire bore. Dragons were typically issued to dragoon cavalry, who needed a lightweight, easily handled firearm to use while mounted.

== Etymology ==
The term dragon is taken from the fact that early versions were decorated with a carving in the form of a mythical dragon's head around the muzzle; the muzzle blast would then give the impression of a fire-breathing dragon.

== History and description ==
A dragon (terakol/terakul) from the Malay World.

Early dragons were short wheellock firearms. It is called a dragon because the muzzle is decorated with a dragon's head. The practice comes from a time when all gunpowder weapons had distinctive names, including the culverin, serpentine, falcon, and falconet. The dragon was effective only at short range, lacking accuracy at long range.

=== Tarkul ===
In the Nusantara archipelago, the weapon is called a tarkul, terakul, or terakol in Malay and Indonesian and seems to have been preferred by cavalry due to its size. The term may refer to a blunderbuss in pistol form, but can also refer to the flintlock musket. They used a flintlock mechanism, and might be derived from Dutch flintlocks which entered the area in the 17th century. However, it is possible that this weapon was only popular among local warriors in more recent times — the terakul was only recorded in Tuhfat al-Nafis from the 1860s. The manuscript mentioned that Bugis troops with chain mail and armed with terakul pemburas (dragon-blunderbusses) defeated Raja Kechil's troops armed with cannons and swords in 1721 CE.

== See also ==
- Pistol
- Shotgun
- Revolvers
