= Bird gun =

Musket used in Ming China and Korea

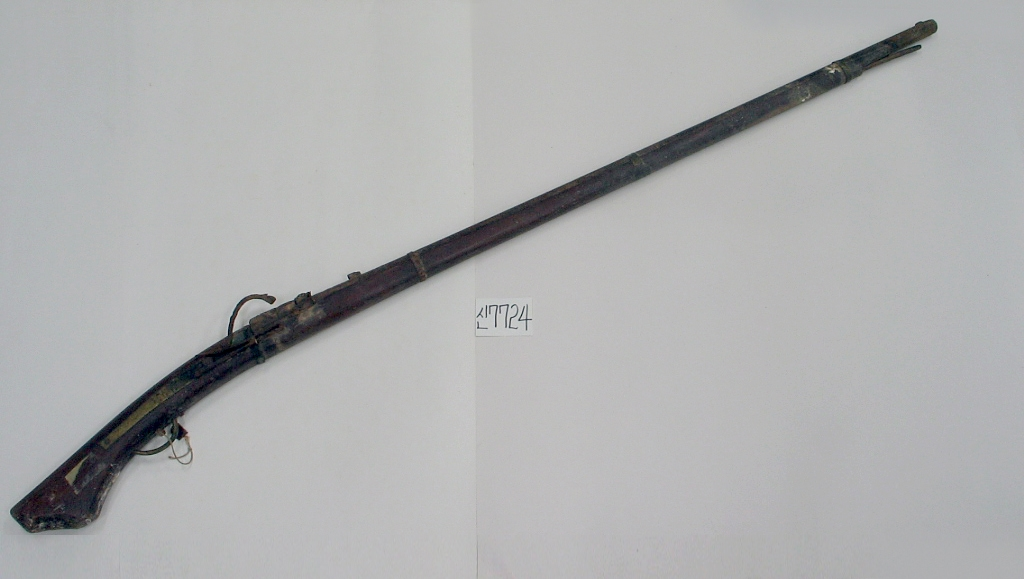
- Korean bird gun, 19th century.
- Type: Musket
- Place of origin: Ming China, Joseon

Service history
- In service: 1558–1895
- Used by: Ming Army; Joseon Army
- Wars: Imjin War; Ming-Manchu Wars

Production history
- Designer: Qi Jiguang, King Seonjo
- Produced: 1558–1621 (in China); 1592-1895 (in Korea)
- Variants: Rifle

Specifications
- Length: 104-140 cm
- Action: Snap matchlock
- Rate of fire: User dependent, usually 1-2 rounds a minute
- Feed system: Muzzle-loaded

Bird gun (Chinese: 鳥銃; pinyin: Niǎo chòng, Korean: 조총; Hanja: 鳥銃; RR: jochong; MR: choch'ong) is the Chinese and Korean name for snap matchlock muskets.

== Name ==
There are multiple theories about the origin of the name for the matchlock musket in Chinese, which has been called "bird-beak gun" or "bird gun". Qi Jiguang believed that it was called the bird gun due to its accuracy and ability to hit a bird. However a modern assessment by Sun Laichen finds this unlikely. According to Sun, the Chinese almost always named things based on their shape or function and it is far more likely that this was the case for the "bird gun". The exact part of the gun that was the source of inspiration for its name is still unclear and there is no concrete evidence available. Joseph Needham speculates that it was the "cock's pecking action" that was the inspiration, but this cannot be confirmed. The muzzle and stock have also been suggested as possible inspirations for the name of the "bird gun".

== History ==
=== Ming China ===
The term bird gun (Chinese: 鳥銃) was mentioned in the military manual Jixiao Xinshu, published in 1560. The book was written by the Ming general Qi Jiguang, who encountered tanegashima firearms while fighting against Wokou (multiethnic pirate groups in the Sea of Japan) in South China (1555-1560). He stated in the Lianbing shiji (1571-77) that the tanegashima were the origin of Chinese matchlocks.

Ming forces had obtained arquebuses by 1548 when a Ming soldier named Li Guangshou wounded a smuggler using a matchlock. In 1548-49, Zhu Wan captured matchlocks from a multinational group of smugglers. In 1562, Zheng Ruozeng stated that bird guns had already entered China before the seizure of Tanegashima in 1548, but were not yet being produced there. However, another source states that the Ming army captured matchlocks from two Portuguese ships in 1523. Around 1553, Zhao Chen proposed manufacturing bird-beak guns to combat pirates. The Ming re-encountered matchlock-wielding Wokou in 1554 when a Ming soldier was wounded by one. In 1555, Ming soldiers on the walls of Nanjing fired at Wokou using matchlocks. One Chinese source credits the pirate Wang Zhi with introducing arquebuses to the Chinese government. An official ordered him to manufacture them after his surrender in 1558. By 1558, mass production of arquebuses began in Chinese state arsenals. That year, the first batch of 10,000 guns was produced. In the same year, many Wokou were gunned down by Ming soldiers wielding matchlocks.

By the late Ming dynasty, bird guns were used extensively, but were not the primary infantry weapon. A military report from the early 1620s, during the war with the Later Jin dynasty of the Jurchens, requested the mobilization of 130,000 new soldiers and production of 7000 san yan chong (hand cannons) and bird guns. During the 1618-1622 period, the Ming Ministry of Works reported the production of 6425 muskets, 98,547 polearms and swords, 26,214 great “horse decapitator” swords, and 42,800 bows. In 1629, the Minister of Rites Xu Guangqi, a Catholic convert under Portuguese influence, proposed the formation of new brigades consisting of 5200 infantry each, of which 1200 would be armed with bird guns.

=== Kingdom of Joseon ===
Though developed in Ming China, bird guns were most widely used in Joseon after 1592. Since the 15th century, Joseon produced chongtong and other hand cannons. However, arquebuses or muskets were unknown until the early 16th century. When Imjin War began in 1592, after their first battles against the Japanese invaders, Koreans quickly adopted the matchlock. The first Tanegashima, captured from the enemy, were adopted into the Korean military as soon as 1592, as their firepower was considered to be five times that of a Korean bow. Indigenous production began by 1593 and received some support from King Seonjo. Admiral Yi Sun-sin and several other commanders selected gunsmiths from among Japanese prisoners of war and put them to work, starting matchlock production in March 1593 and educating local Korean workers along the way. By the end of 1593, matchlock guns were already produced in many provincial cities.

After the Imjin War ended in 1597, Korea initiated a comprehensive military reform, adopting the bird gun as the primary infantry weapon and relegating the bow and arrow to cavalry and officers. Korean technical expertise in manufacturing arquebuses was acknowledged by the Qing dynasty, which offered to import large numbers of arquebuses from Joseon in 1657.

== Characteristics ==
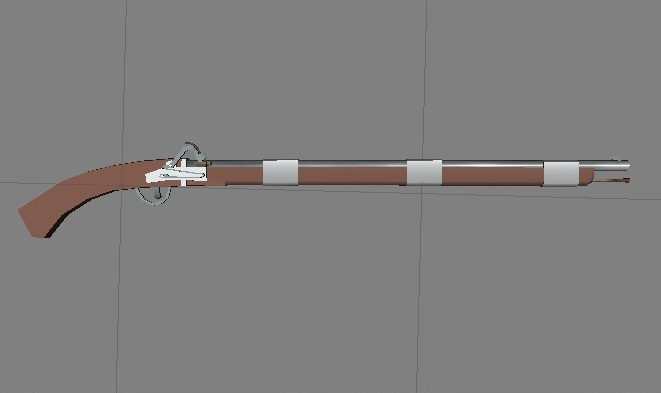
3D model af a Bird gun, 17th century.

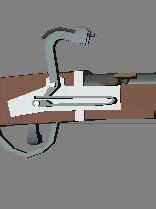
Snap-matchlock mechanism ready to fire.

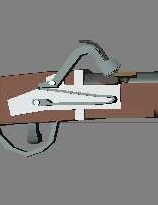
Snap-matchlock mechanism fired.

Bird guns had long barrels and were fitted with iron sights. A 17th century source recommended the barrel length of three chi, which is about 1 metre (3 ft 3 in). The same source considered the longest effective range to be about 100 paces.

Bird guns were considered exact and powerful weapons for the time. Qi Jiguang claimed that a bird gun, in the hands of a properly trained soldier, could hit "a willow leaf from a hundred paces away", and that its accuracy was 80-90% (8-9 hits out of 10).They were considered powerful enough to pierce the heaviest armor.

Larger firearms are mentioned in a source from 1637: they were similar to bird guns but had a 2 metres (6 ft 7 in) barrel and used twice as much gunpowder. Their effective range exceeded 200 paces.

A preserved Ming report from 1596 or 1597 states that of the four known models of matchlocks at the time (Western, Japanese, Korean, and Ottoman), the Ottoman matchlock musket, which the Chinese report called a "Rumi gun", was by far the best. They were lighter, had a longer range, and had greater firepower. Their sights were better, and their lock was more convenient than that of the Tanegashima. After the Ottoman matchlock, the best were the Western ones: they were lighter, and their range was 50-60 paces longer than the Japanese matchlock.

== Use in battle ==
The first recorded use of a matchlock in battle by a Ming soldier dates to a military report on a battle against Chinese and Japanese Wokou in April 1548. Bird guns were used regularly by the Ming units in South China after 1553, but only in limited numbers. More widespread use of bird guns in battle is mentioned in military reports after 1558: two reports from 1558-1559 mention units of 500 and 340 Ming musketeers, respectively.

The first significant test of the bird gun came in 1619, when a corps of 10,000 Korean musketeers was sent to assist the Ming resistance to the Manchu. Although the battle was ultimately lost, Koreans inflicted heavy casualties on the Manchu cavalry.

== See also ==
- Kingdom (South Korean TV series), set in 1601.
- The Fortress (2017 film), set in 1636.

== Literature ==
- Needham, Joseph; Ho, Peng Yoke; Lu, Gwei-Djen; Wang, Ling (1986). Science and civilisation in China: the gunpowder epic. Cambridge London New York [etc.]: Cambridge university press. pp. 425–471. ISBN 978-0-521-30358-3.
