= Arquebus =

Type of long gun appearing in 15th-century Europe

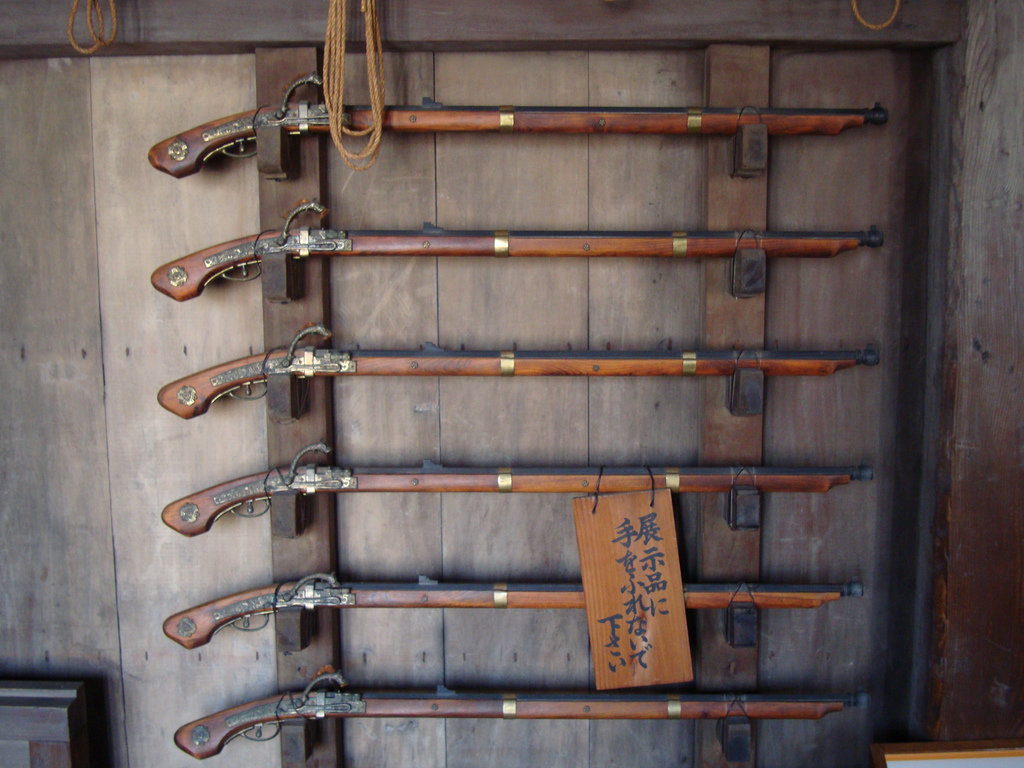
Japanese Tanegashima arquebuses on a rack at Himeji Castle

An arquebus (/ˈɑːrk(w)əbəs/ AR-k(w)ə-bəs) is a form of long gun that appeared in Europe and the Ottoman Empire during the 15th century. An infantryman armed with an arquebus is called an arquebusier.

The term arquebus was applied to many different forms of firearms from the 15th to 17th centuries, but it originally referred to "a hand-gun with a hook-like projection or lug on its under surface, useful for steadying it against battlements or other objects when firing". These "hook guns" were in their earliest forms defensive weapons mounted on German city walls in the early 15th century. The addition of a shoulder stock, priming pan, and matchlock mechanism in the late 15th century turned the arquebus into a handheld firearm and also the first firearm equipped with a trigger.

The exact dating of the matchlock's appearance is disputed. It could have appeared in the Ottoman Empire as early as 1465 and in Europe a little before 1475. The heavy arquebus, which was then called a musket, was developed to better penetrate plate armor and appeared in Europe around 1521. Heavy arquebuses mounted on war wagons were called arquebus à croc. These carried a lead ball of about 100 grams (3.5 oz).

Smaller versions of these guns called archibusetti existed in 16th century Italy. A standardized arquebus, the caliver, was introduced in the latter half of the 16th century. The name "caliver" is an English derivation from the French calibre : a reference to the gun's standardized bore. The caliver allowed troops to load bullets faster since they fitted their guns more easily, whereas before soldiers often had to modify their bullets into suitable fits, or even made their own prior to battle.

The matchlock arquebus is considered the forerunner to the flintlock musket, and successor to the hand cannon.

== Terminology ==
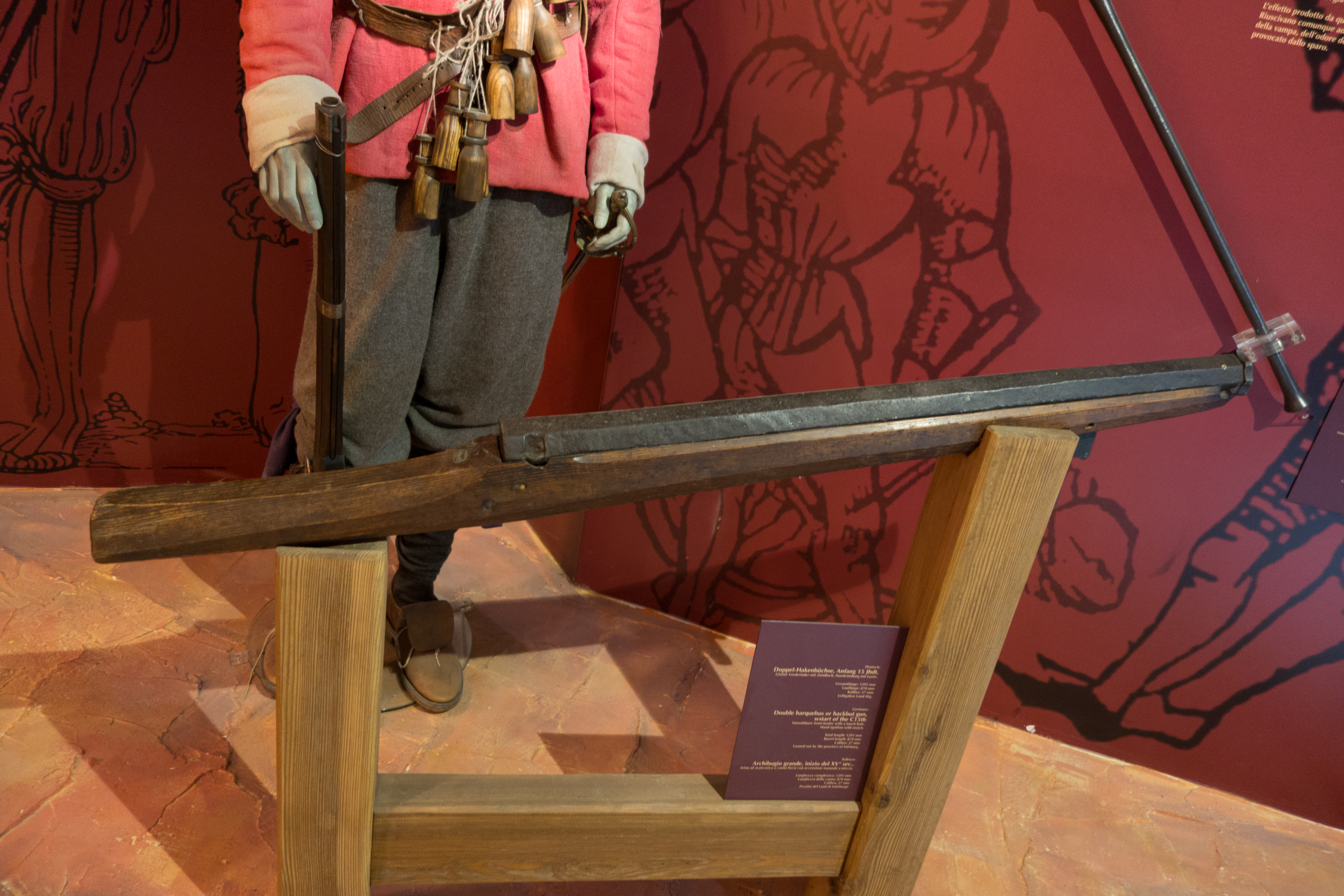
A "double arquebus", 15th century

The term arquebus is derived from the Dutch word haakbus ("hook gun"), which was applied to an assortment of firearms from the 15th to 17th centuries. It originally referred to "a hand-gun with a hook-like projection or lug on its under surface, useful for steadying it against battlements or other objects when firing". The first certain attestation of the term arquebus dates back to 1364, when the lord of Milan, Bernabò Visconti, recruited 70 archibuxoli, although in this case it almost certainly referred to a hand cannon. The arquebus has at times been known as the harquebus, harkbus, hackbut, hagbut, archibugio, haakbus, schiopo, sclopus, tüfenk, tofak, matchlock, and firelock.

During the 16th century in today's Italy, smaller versions of the arquebus existed, especially in Italy, called archibusetti (“little arquebuses”). These were short enough to be concealed and were heavily regulated due to concerns of assassinations and banditry.

=== Musket ===
The musket, essentially a large arquebus, was introduced around 1521, but fell out of favor by the mid-16th century due to the decline of armor. The term, however, remained and musket became a generic descriptor for smoothbore gunpowder weapons fired from the shoulder ("shoulder arms") into the mid-19th century. At least on one occasion musket and arquebus were used interchangeably to refer to the same weapon, and even referred to as an arquebus musket. A Habsburg commander in the mid-1560s once referred to muskets as double arquebuses. The matchlock firing mechanism also became a common term for the arquebus after it was added to the firearm. Later flintlock firearms were sometimes called fusils or fuzees.

== Mechanism and usage ==
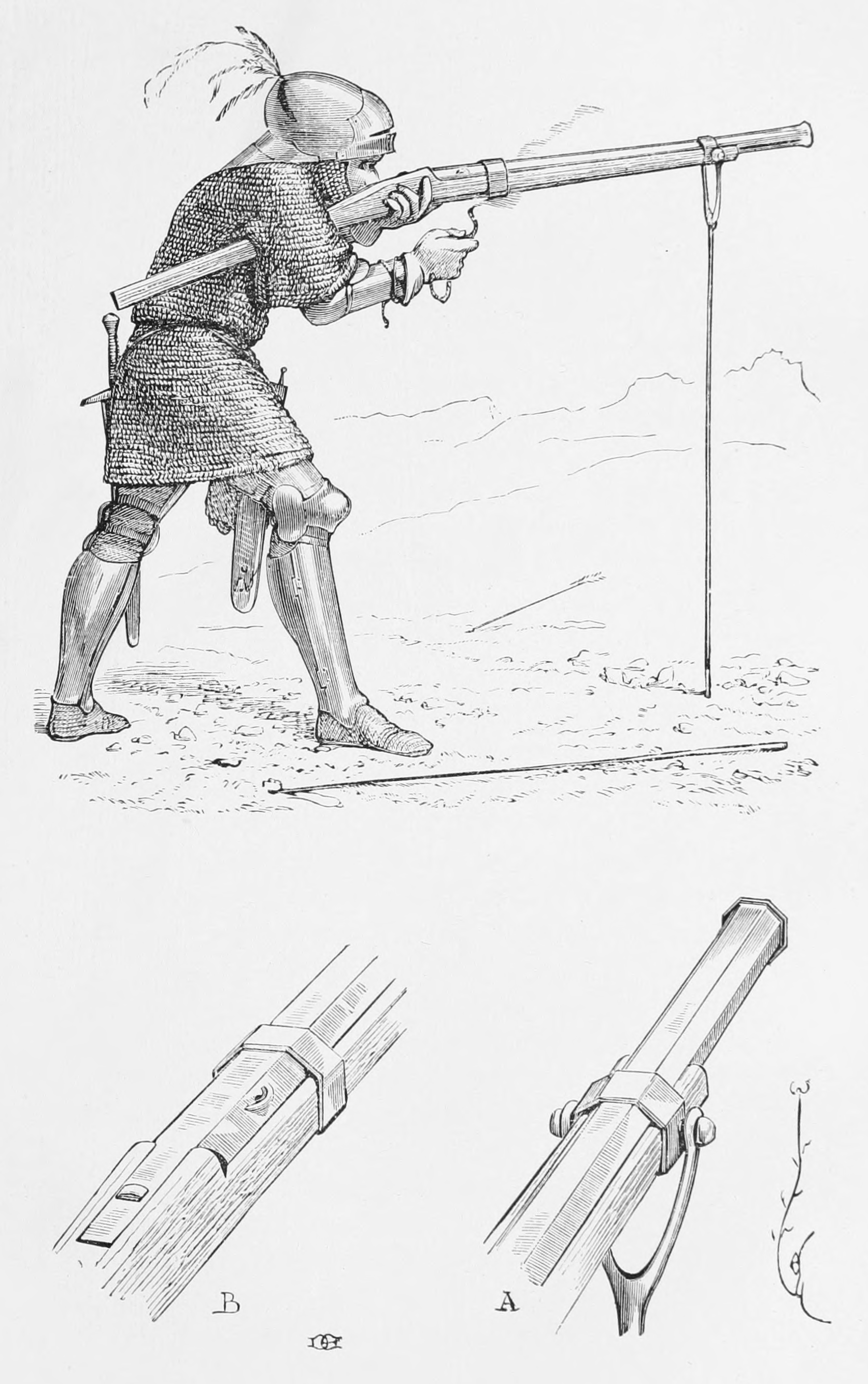
Depiction of an arquebus fired from a fork rest. Image produced in 1876.

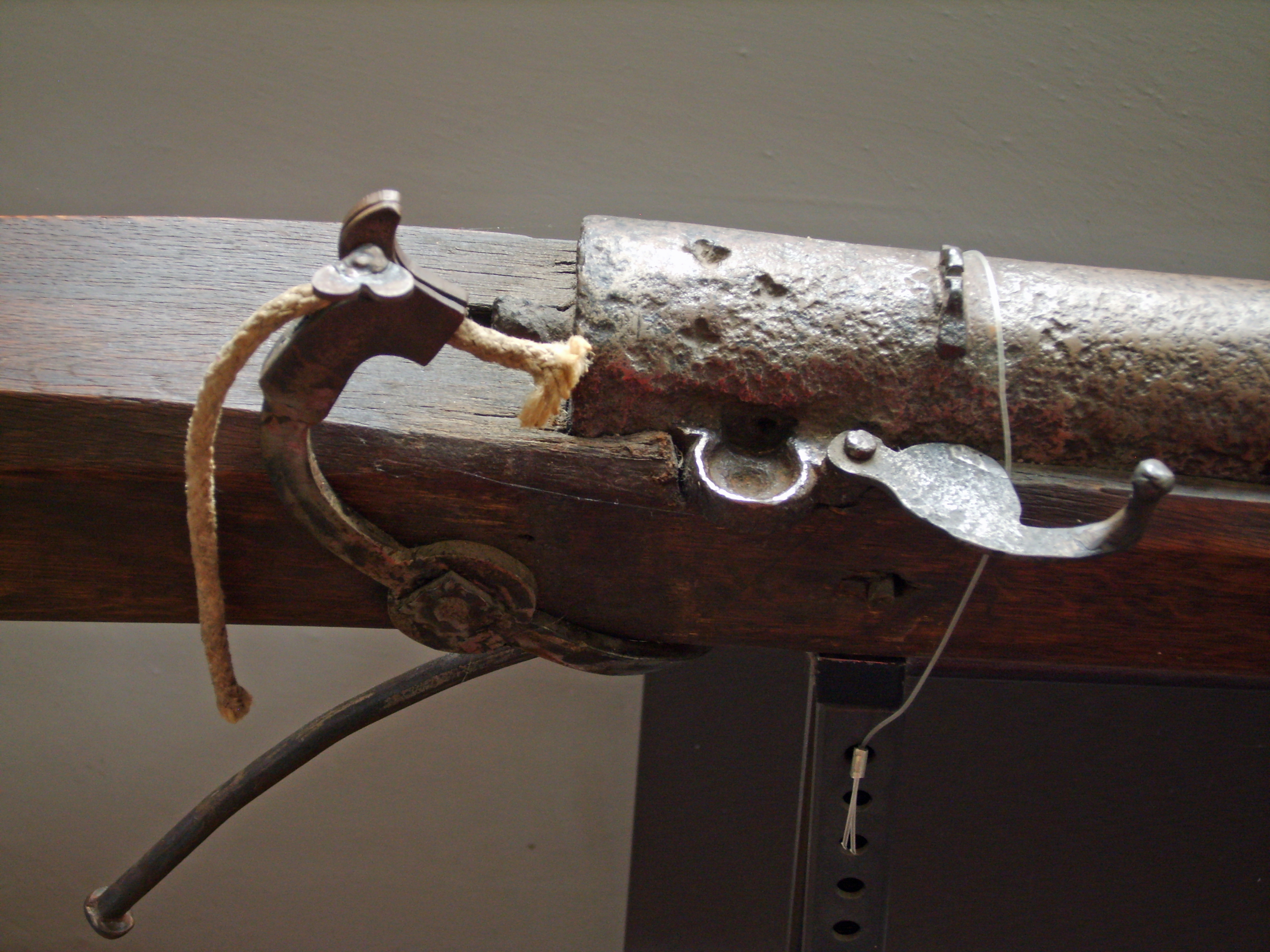
A serpentine matchlock mechanism

Demonstration of Tanegashima in Himeji Castle

Prior to the appearance of the serpentine lever by around 1411, handguns were fired from the chest, tucked under one arm, while the other arm maneuvered a hot pricker to the touch hole to ignite the gunpowder. The matchlock, which appeared roughly around 1475, changed this by adding a firing mechanism consisting of two parts, the match, and the lock. The lock mechanism held within a clamp a 60-to-90 cm (2-to-3 ft) long length of smoldering rope soaked in saltpeter, which was the match. Connected to the lock lever was a trigger, which lowered the match into a priming pan when squeezed, igniting the priming powder, causing a flash to travel through the touch hole, also igniting the gunpowder within the barrel, and propelling the bullet out the muzzle.

While matchlocks provided a crucial advantage by allowing the user to aim the firearm using both hands, it was also awkward to utilize. To avoid accidentally igniting the gunpowder the match had to be detached while loading the gun. In some instances the match would also go out, so both ends of the match were kept lit. This proved cumbersome to maneuver as both hands were required to hold the match during removal, one end in each hand. The procedure was so complex that a 1607 drill manual published by Jacob de Gheyn in the Netherlands listed 28 steps just to fire and load the gun. In 1584 the Ming General Qi Jiguang composed an 11-step song to practice the procedure in rhythm: "One, clean the gun. Two, pour the powder. Three, tamp the powder down. Four, drop the pellet. Five, drive the pellet down. Six, put in paper (stopper). Seven, drive the paper down. Eight, open the flashpan cover. Nine, pour in the flash powder. Ten, close the flashpan, and clamp the fuse. Eleven, listen for the signal, then open the flashpan cover. Aiming at the enemy, raise your gun and fire." Reloading a gun during the 16th century took anywhere from 20 seconds to a minute under the most ideal conditions.

The development of volley fire by the Ottomans, the Chinese, the Japanese, and the Dutch made the arquebus more feasible for widespread adoption by militaries. The volley fire technique transformed soldiers carrying firearms into organized firing squads with each row of soldiers firing in turn and reloading in a systematic fashion. Volley fire was implemented with cannons as early as 1388 by Ming artillerists, but volley fire with matchlocks was not implemented until 1526 when the Ottoman Janissaries utilized it during the Battle of Mohács. The matchlock volley fire technique was next seen in mid-16th-century China as pioneered by Qi Jiguang and in late-16th-century Japan. Qi Jiguang elaborates on his volley fire technique in the Jixiao Xinshu:

All the musketeers, when they get near the enemy are not allowed to fire early, and they're not allowed to just fire everything off in one go, [because] whenever the enemy then approaches close, there won't be enough time to load the guns (銃裝不及), and frequently this mismanagement costs the lives of many people. Thus, whenever the enemy gets to within a hundred paces' distance, they [the musketeers] are to wait until they hear a blast on the bamboo flute, at which they deploy themselves in front of the troops, with each platoon (哨) putting in front one team (隊). They [the musketeer team members] wait until they hear their own leader fire a shot, and only then are they allowed to give fire. Each time the trumpet gives a blast, they fire one time, spread out in battle array according to the drilling patterns. If the trumpet keeps blasting without stopping, then they are allowed to fire all together until their fire is exhausted, and it's not necessary [in this case] to divide into layers.

— Jixiao Xinshu

In Europe, William Louis, Count of Nassau-Dillenburg theorized that by applying to firearms the same Roman counter march technique as described by Aelianus Tacticus, matchlocks could provide fire without cease. In a letter to his cousin Maurice of Nassau, Prince of Orange, on 8 December 1594, he wrote:

I have discovered evolutionibus [a term that would eventually be translated as drill] a method of getting the musketeers and others with guns not only to practice firing but to keep on doing so in a very effective battle order (that is to say, they do not fire at will or from behind a barrier ...). Just as soon as the first rank has fired, then by the drill [they have learned] they will march to the back. The second rank either marching forward or standing still, will then fire just like the first. After that the third and following ranks will do the same. When the last rank has fired, the first will have reloaded, as the following diagram shows.

Once volley firing had been developed, the rate of fire and efficiency was greatly increased and the arquebus went from being a support weapon to the primary focus of most early modern armies.

The wheellock mechanism was utilized as an alternative to the matchlock as early as 1505, but was more expensive to produce at three times the cost of a matchlock and prone to breakdown, thus limiting it primarily to specialist firearms and pistols.

The snaphance flintlock was invented by the mid-16th century and then the "true" flintlock in the early 17th century, but by this time the generic term for firearms had shifted to musket, and flintlocks are not usually associated with arquebuses.

Firing sequence

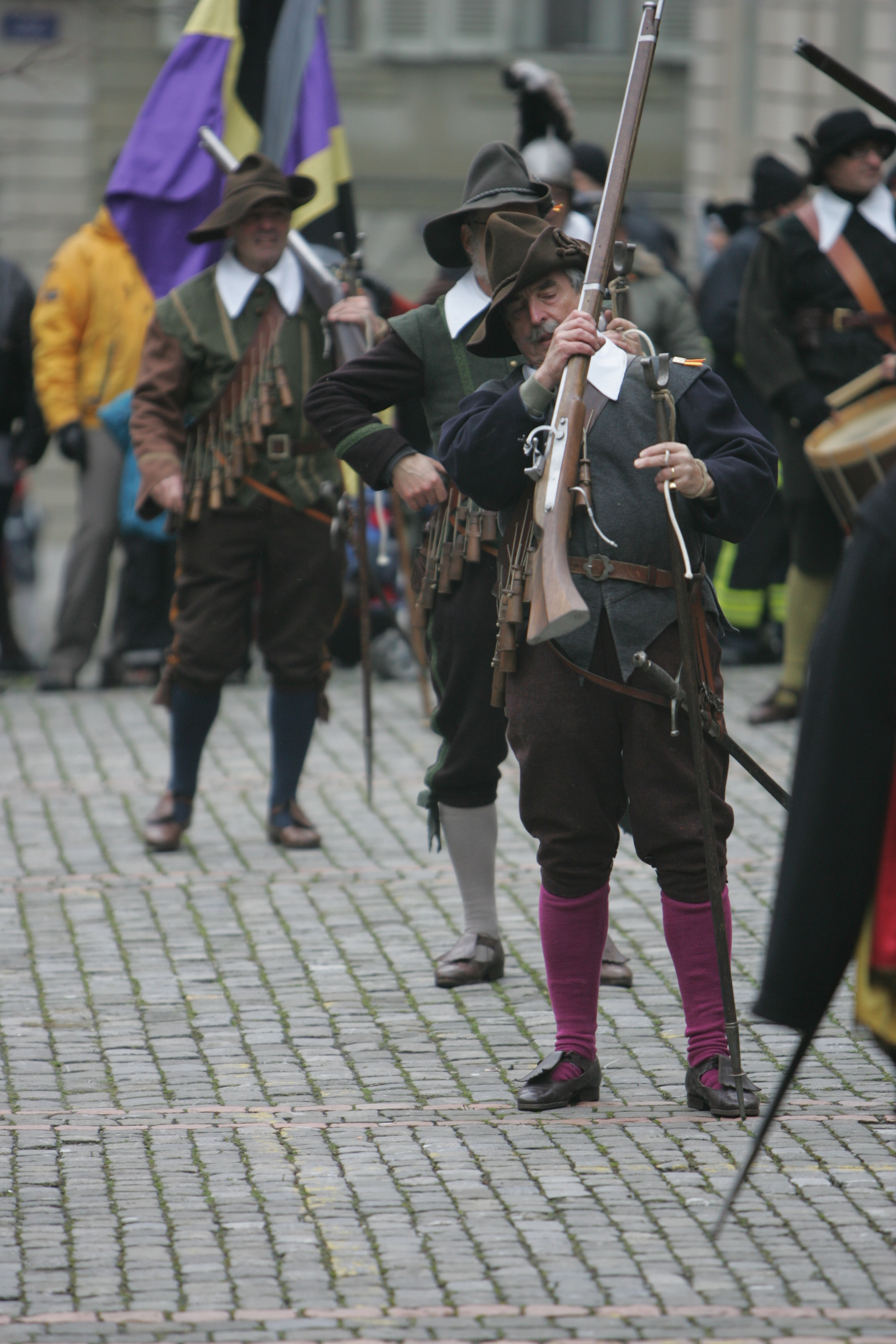
Placing the weapon on its rest

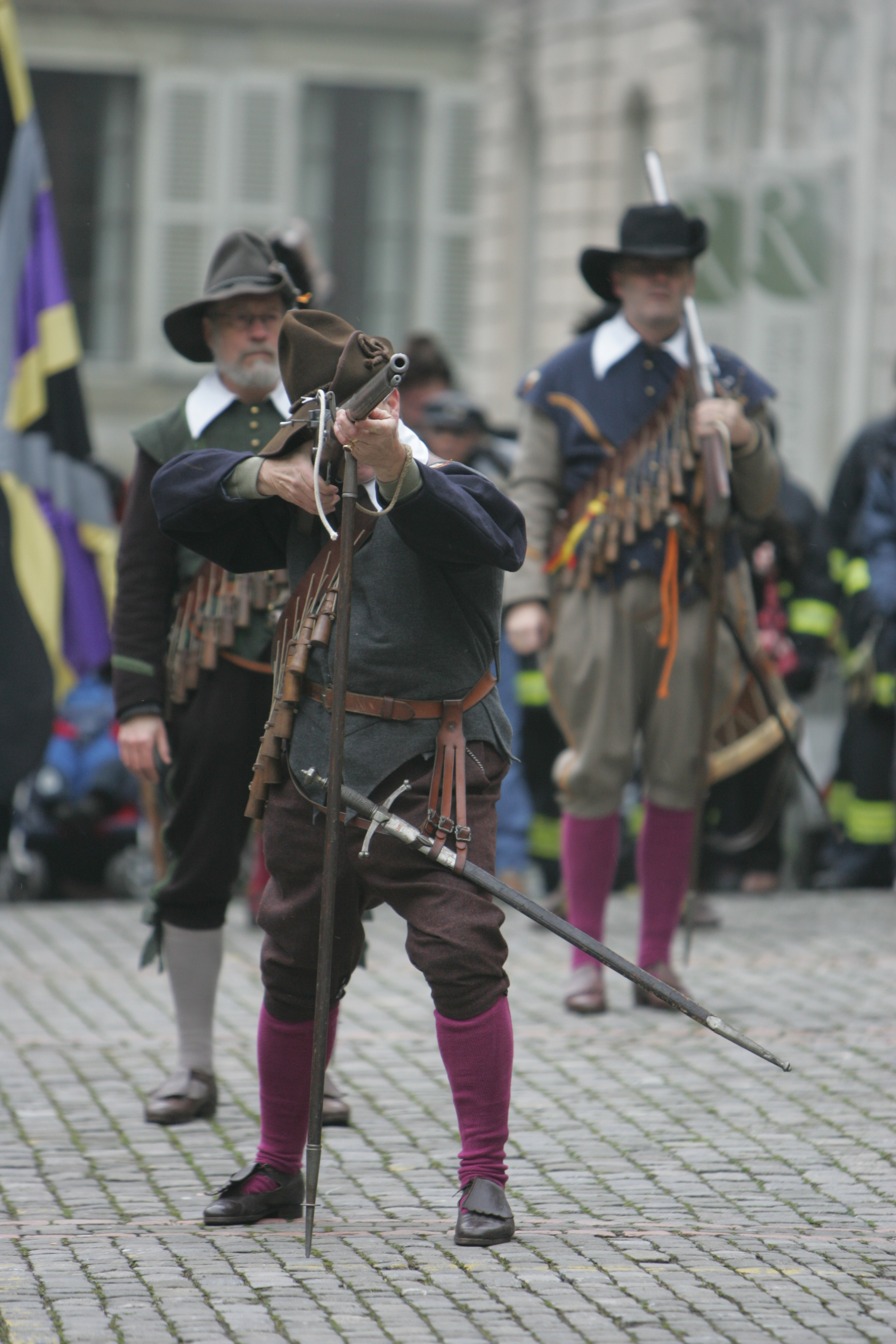
Aiming, finger on the trigger

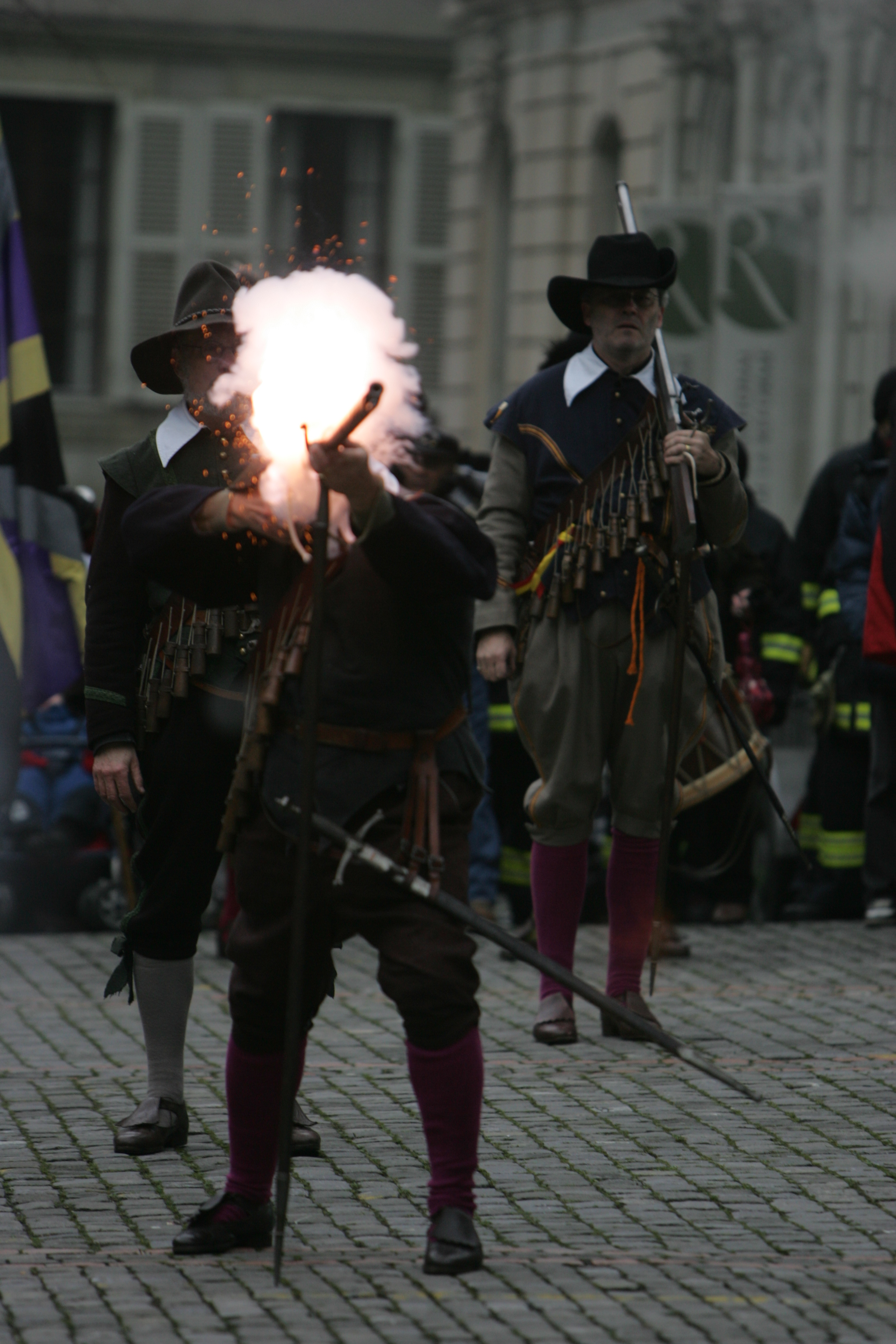
The lock ignites the primer

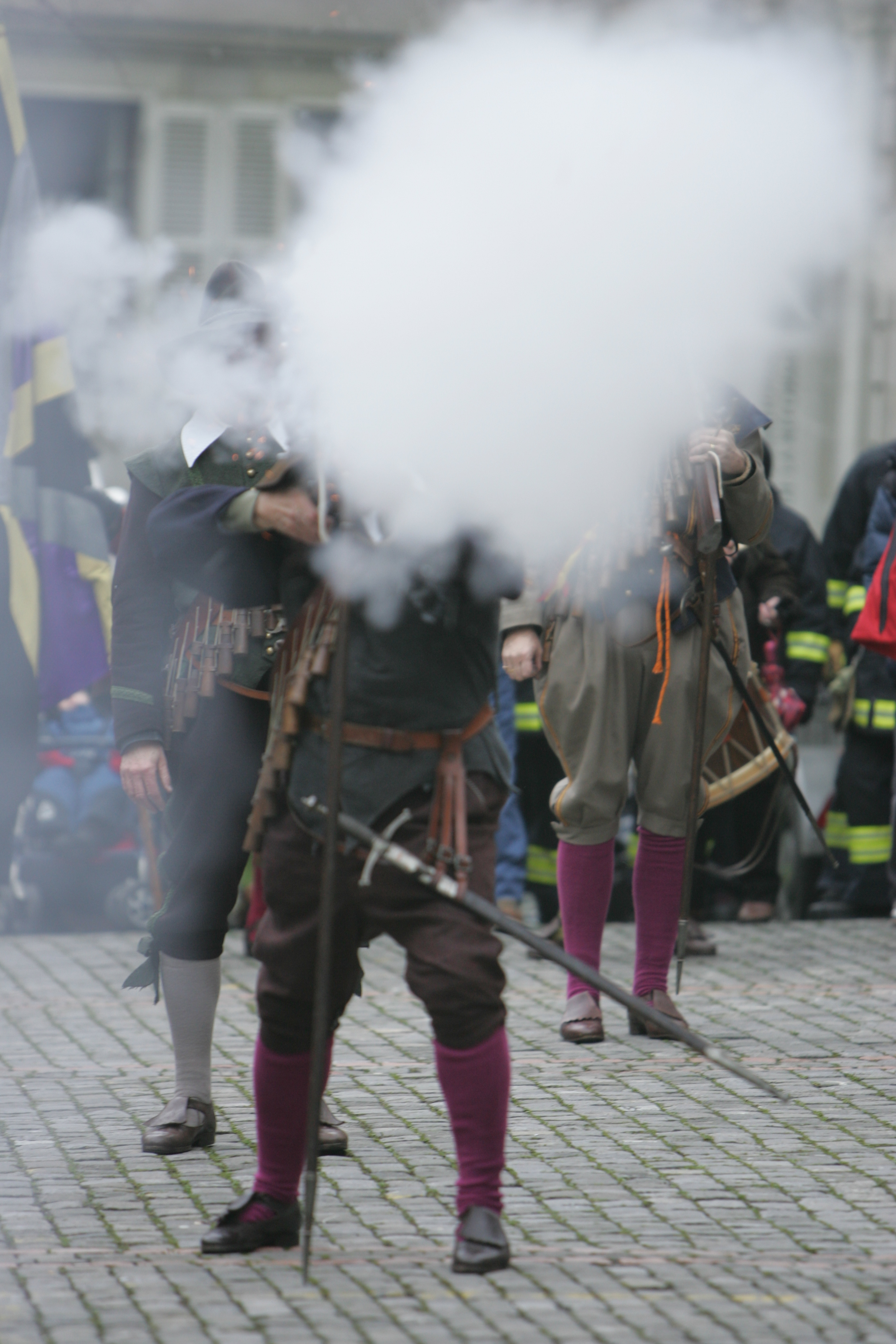
The main propellant is ignited, and much smoke ensues

== History ==
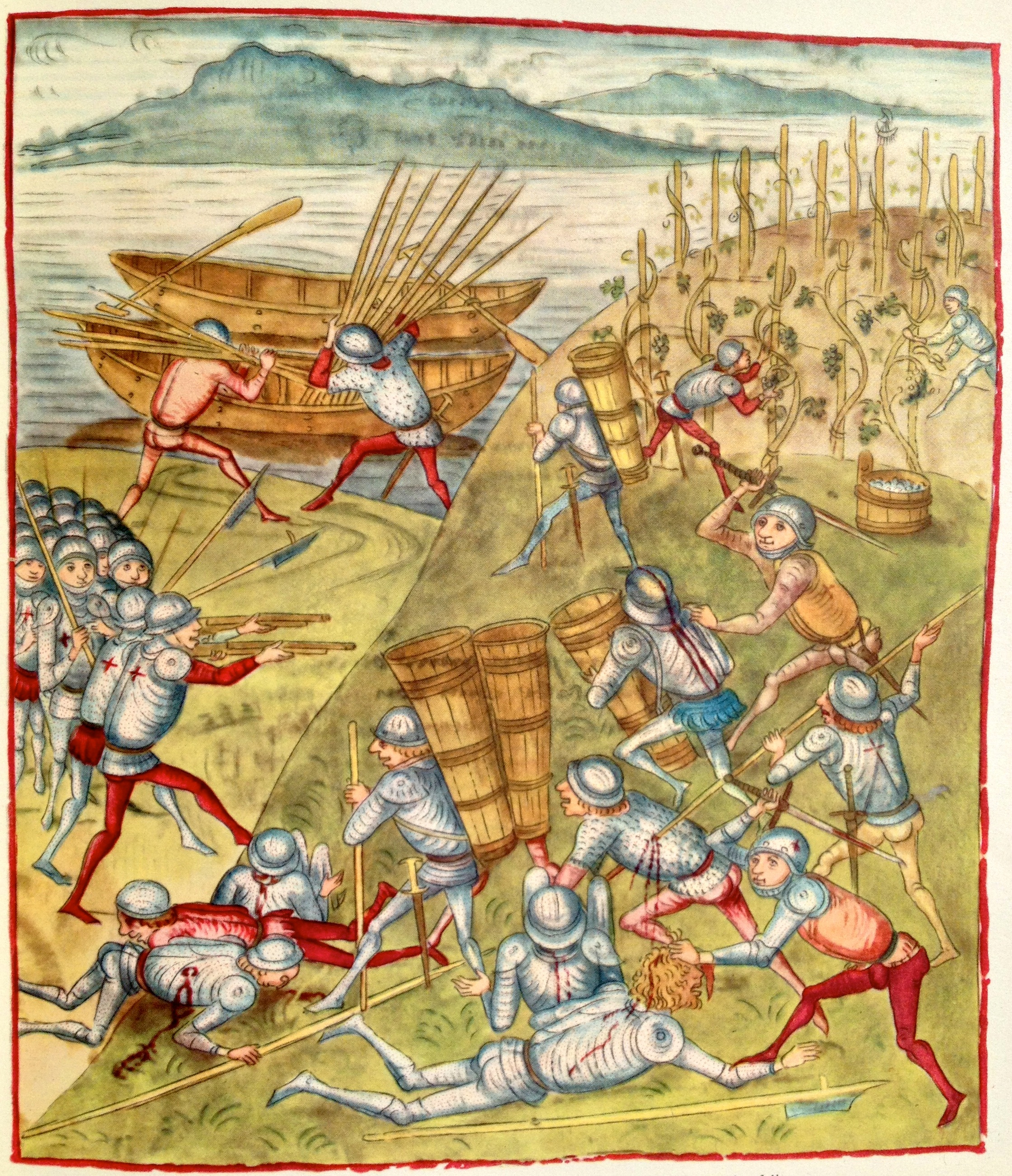
Two soldiers on the left using arquebuses, 1470

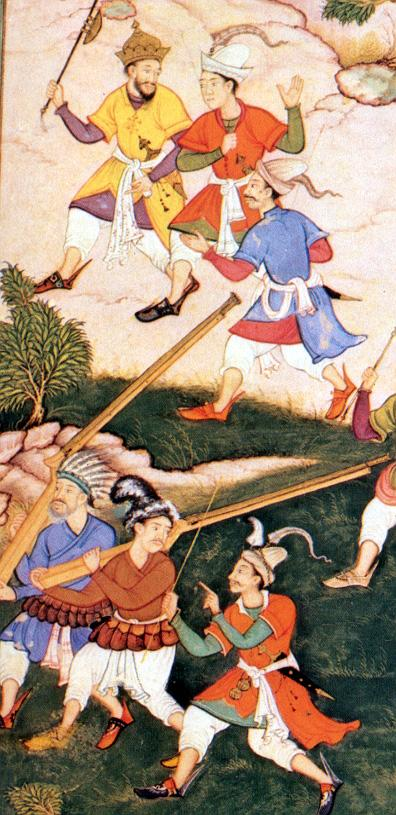
Early matchlocks as illustrated in the Baburnama (16th century)

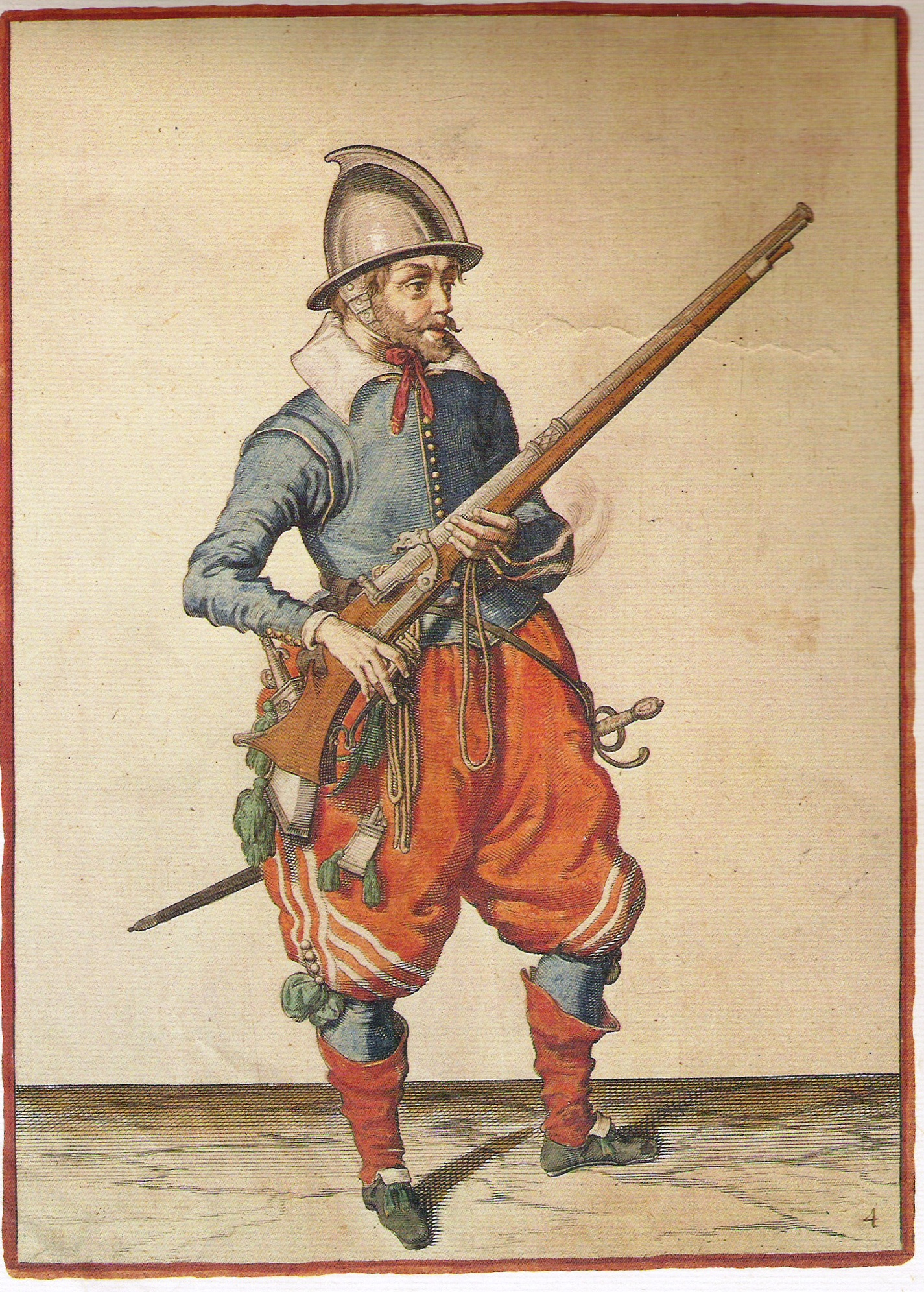
Musketeer from Jacob van Gheyn's Wapenhandelingen van Roers, Musquetten ende Spiesen (1608)

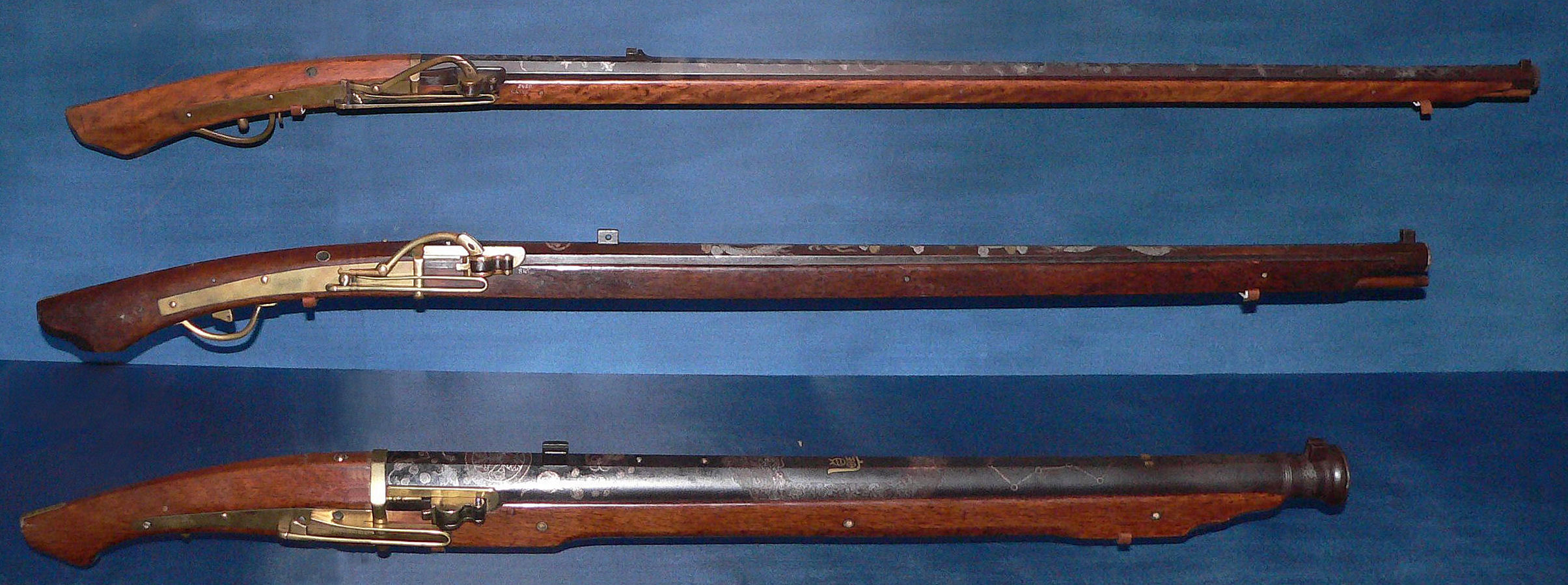
Tanegashima arquebus of the Edo period

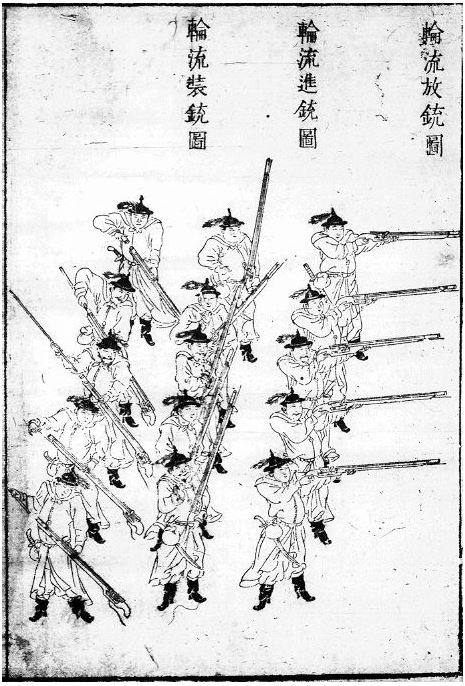
Illustration of a 1639 Ming musketry volley formation

=== Origins ===
The earliest known examples of an "arquebus" date back to 1411 in Europe and no later than 1425 in the Ottoman Empire. This early firearm was a hand cannon that used a serpentine lever to hold matches and did not have the matchlock mechanism traditionally associated with the arquebus. The first references to the use of what may have been arquebuses (tüfek) by the Janissary corps of the Ottoman army date them from 1394 to 1465. However, it is unclear whether these were arquebuses or small cannons as late as 1444, but according to Gábor Ágoston the fact that they were listed separately from cannons in mid-15th century inventories suggest they were handheld firearms.

In Europe, a shoulder stock, probably inspired by the crossbow stock, was added to the arquebus around 1470 and the appearance of the matchlock mechanism is dated to a little before 1475. The matchlock arquebus was the first firearm equipped with a trigger mechanism. It is also considered to be the first portable shoulder-arms firearm. The exact dating of the matchlock addition is disputed. Some scholars such as Joseph Needham and Ágoston have proposed that matchlocks may have been first invented in Turkey by 1465, but according to Korean historian Hyeok Hweon Kang, the evidence for a European origin of the matchlock is “overwhelming”.

=== Ottomans ===
The Ottomans made use of arquebuses as early as the first half of the fifteenth century. During the Ottoman–Hungarian wars of 1443–1444, it was noted that Ottoman defenders in Vidin had arquebuses. Based on the earliest known contemporary written sources, Godfrey Goodwin dates the first use of the arquebus by the Janissaries to no earlier than 1465. According to contemporary accounts, 400 arquebusiers served in Sultan Murad II's campaign in the 1440s when he crossed Bosporus straits and arquebuses were used in combat by the Ottomans at the second battle of Kosovo in 1448. Ottomans also made some use of Wagon Fortresses which they copied from the Hussites, which often involved the placing of arquebusiers in the protective wagons and using them against the enemy. Arquebusiers were also used effectively at the battle of Bashkent in 1473 when they were used in conjunction with artillery.

=== Europe ===
The arquebus was used in substantial numbers for the first time in Europe during the reign of King Matthias Corvinus of Hungary (r. 1458–1490). One in four soldiers in the infantry of the Black Army of Hungary wielded an arquebus, and one in five when accounting for the whole army, which was an unusually high proportion at the time. Although they were present on the battlefield King Mathias preferred enlisting shielded men instead due to the arquebus's low rate of fire. While the Black Army adopted arquebuses relatively early, the trend did not catch on for decades in Europe and by the turn of the 16th century only around 10% of Western European infantrymen used firearms. Arquebuses were used as early as 1472 by the Portuguese at Zamora. Likewise, the Castilians used arquebuses as well in 1476. The French started adopting the arquebus in 1520. However, arquebus designs continued to develop and in 1496 Philip Monch of the Palatinate composed an illustrated Buch der Strynt un(d) Buchsse(n) on guns and "harquebuses".

Arquebuses were used in the Italian Wars in the first half of the 16th century. Their effectiveness was apparent by the Battle of Cerignola of 1503, which is the earliest-recorded military conflict where arquebuses played a decisive role in the outcome of the battle. Frederick Lewis Taylor claims that a kneeling volley fire may have been employed by Fernando d'Avalos's arquebusiers as early as the Battle of Bicocca (1522). However, this has been called into question by Tonio Andrade who believes this is an overinterpretation as well as a mis-citation of a passage by Charles Oman suggesting that the Spanish arquebusiers knelt to reload, when in fact Oman never made such a claim. This is contested by Idan Sherer, who quotes Paolo Giovio saying that the arquebusiers kneeled to reload so that the second line of arquebusiers could fire without endangering those in front of them.

In Russia, a small arquebus called pishchal (Russian: пищаль) appeared in 1478 in Pskov. The Russian arquebusiers, or pishchal'niki, were seen as integral parts of the army and one thousand pishchal'niki participated in the Muscovite annexation of the Pskov Republic in 1510, as well as the conquest of Smolensk in 1512. The Russian need to acquire gunpowder weaponry bears some resemblance to the situation the Iranians were in. In 1545, two thousand pishchal'niki (one thousand on horseback) were levied by the towns and outfitted at treasury expense. Their use of mounted troops was also unique to the time period. The pishchal'niki eventually became skilled hereditary tradesmen farmers rather than conscripts.

=== Mamluks ===
The Mamluks in particular were conservatively against the incorporation of gunpowder weapons. When faced with cannons and arquebuses wielded by the Ottomans they criticized them thus, "God curse the man who invented them, and God curse the man who fires on Muslims with them." Insults were also levied against the Ottomans for having "brought with you this contrivance artfully devised by the Christians of Europe when they were incapable of meeting the Muslim armies on the battlefield". Similarly, musketeers and musket-wielding infantrymen were despised in society by the feudal knights, even until the time of Miguel de Cervantes (1547–1616). Eventually the Mamluks under Qaitbay were ordered in 1489 to train in the use of al-bunduq al-rasas (arquebuses). However, in 1514 an Ottoman army of 12,000 soldiers wielding arquebuses devastated a much larger Mamluk army. The arquebus had become a common infantry weapon by the 16th century due to its relative cheapness: a helmet, breastplate and pike cost about three and a quarter ducats while an arquebus only a little over one ducat. Another advantage of arquebuses over other equipment and weapons was its short training period. While a bow potentially took years to master, an effective arquebusier could be trained in just two weeks.

=== Asia ===
The arquebus spread further east, reaching India by 1500, Southeast Asia by 1540, and China sometime between 1523 and 1548. They were introduced to Japan in 1543 by Portuguese traders who landed by accident on Tanegashima (種子島), an island south of Kyūshū in the region controlled by the Shimazu clan. By 1550, arquebuses known as tanegashima, teppō (鉄砲) or hinawaju (火縄銃) were being produced in large numbers in Japan. The tanegashima seem to have used snap matchlocks based on firearms from Goa, India, which was captured by the Portuguese in 1510. Within ten years of its introduction upwards of three hundred thousand tanegashima were reported to have been manufactured. The tanegashima eventually became one of the most important weapons in Japan. Oda Nobunaga revolutionized musket tactics in Japan by splitting loaders and shooters and assigning three guns to a shooter at the Battle of Nagashino in 1575, during which volley fire may have been implemented. However, the volley fire technique of 1575 has been called into dispute in recent years by J. S. A. Elisonas and J. P. Lamers in their translation of The Chronicle of Oda Nobunaga by Ota Gyuichi. In Lamers' Japonius he says that "whether or not Nobunaga actually operated with three rotating ranks cannot be determined on the basis of reliable evidence." They claim that the version of events describing volley fire was written several years after the battle, and an earlier account says to the contrary that guns were fired en masse. Even so, both Korean and Chinese sources note that Japanese gunners were making use of volley fire during the Japanese invasions of Korea from 1592 to 1598.

==== Iran ====
Regarding use of the arquebus in Persia (Iran), much of the credit for their increase in use can be attributed to Shah Ismail I who, after being defeated by the firearm-using Ottomans in 1514, began extensive use of arquebuses and other firearms himself with an estimated 12,000 arquebusiers in service less than 10 years after his initial defeat by the Ottomans. According to a 1571 report by Vincentio d'Alessandri, Persian arms including arquebuses "were superior and better tempered than those of any other nation", suggesting that such firearms were in common use among middle eastern powers by at least the mid-16th century. While the use of 12,000 arquebusiers is impressive, the firearms were not widely adopted in Iran. This is in no small part due to the reliance on light cavalry by the Iranians. Riding a horse and operating an arquebus are incredibly difficult which helped lead to both limited use and heavy stagnation in the technology associated with firearms. These limitations aside, the Iranians still made use of firearms and Europe was very important in facilitating that as Europeans supplied Iran with firearms and sent experts to help them produce some of the firearms themselves. Iran also made use of elephant mounted arquebusiers which would give them a clear view of their targets and better mobility.

==== Southeast Asia ====
Southeast Asian powers started fielding arquebuses by 1540. Đại Việt was considered by the Ming to have produced particularly advanced matchlocks during the 16–17th century, surpassing even Ottoman, Japanese, and European firearms. European observers of the Lê–Mạc War and later Trịnh–Nguyễn War also noted the proficiency of matchlock making by the Vietnamese. The Vietnamese matchlock was said to have been able to pierce several layers of iron armour, kill two to five men in one shot, yet also fire quietly for a weapon of its caliber.

==== China ====
The arquebus was introduced to the Ming dynasty in the early 16th century and was used in small numbers to fight off pirates by 1548. There is, however, no exact date for its introduction and sources conflict on the time and manner in which it was introduced. Versions of the arquebus' introduction to China include the capture of firearms by the Ming during a battle in 1523, the capture of the pirate Wang Zhi, who had arquebuses, in 1558, which contradicts the usage of arquebuses by the Ming army ten years earlier, and the capture of arquebuses from Europeans by the Xu brother pirates, which later came into possession of a man named Bald Li, from whom the Ming officials captured the arquebuses. About 10,000 muskets were ordered by the Central Military Weaponry Bureau in 1558 and the firearms were used to fight off pirates.

Qi Jiguang developed military formations for the effective use of arquebus equipped troops with different mixtures of troops deployed in 12-man teams. The number of arquebuses assigned to each team could vary depending on the context but theoretically in certain cases all members of the team could have been deployed as gunners. These formations also made use of countermarch volley fire techniques. Firearm platoons deployed one team in front of them at the blast of a bamboo flute. They started firing after their leader fired and fired once at the blast of a trumpet, and then spread out according to their drilling pattern. Each layer could also fire once at the blowing of a horn and were supported by close-quarters troops who could advance should the need arise. To avoid self-inflicted injuries and ensure a consistent rate of fire in the heat of battle, Qi emphasized drilling in the procedure required to reload the weapon. Qi Jiguang gave a eulogy on the effectiveness of the gun in 1560:

It is unlike any other of the many types of fire weapons. In strength it can pierce armor. In accuracy it can strike the center of targets, even to the point of hitting the eye of a coin [i.e., shooting right through a coin], and not just for exceptional shooters. ... The arquebus [鳥銃] is such a powerful weapon and is so accurate that even bow and arrow cannot match it, and ... nothing is so strong as to be able to defend against it.

— Jixiao Xinshu

=== European arquebus formations ===
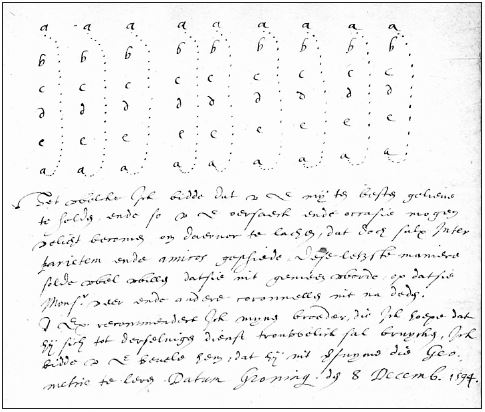
Diagram of a 1594 Dutch musketry volley formation

In Europe, Maurice of Nassau pioneered the countermarch volley fire technique. After outfitting his entire army with new, standardized arms in 1599, Maurice of Nassau attempted to recapture Spanish forts built on former Dutch lands. In the Battle of Nieuwpoort in 1600, he administered the new techniques and technologies for the first time. The Dutch marched onto the beach where the fort was located and fully utilized the countermarching tactic. By orienting all of his arquebusiers into a block, he was able to maintain a steady stream of fire out of a disciplined formation using volley fire tactics. The result was a lopsided victory with 4,000 Spanish casualties to only 1,000 dead and 700 wounded on the Dutch side. Although the battle was principally won by the decisive counterattack of the Dutch cavalry and despite the failure of the new Dutch infantry tactic in stopping the veteran Spanish tercios, the battle is considered a decisive step forward in the development early modern warfare, where firearms took on an increasingly large role in Europe in the following centuries.

=== Use with other weapons ===
The arquebus had many advantages but also severe limitations on the battlefield. This led to it often being paired up with other weaponry to mitigate these weaknesses. Qi Jiguang from China developed systems where soldiers with traditional weaponry stayed right behind the arquebusiers to protect them should enemy infantry get too close. Pikemen were used to protect the arquebusiers by the English and the Venetians often used archers to lay down cover fire during the long reloading process. The Ottomans often supported their arquebusiers with artillery fire or placed them in fortified wagons, a tactic they borrowed from the Hussites.

== Comparison to bows ==
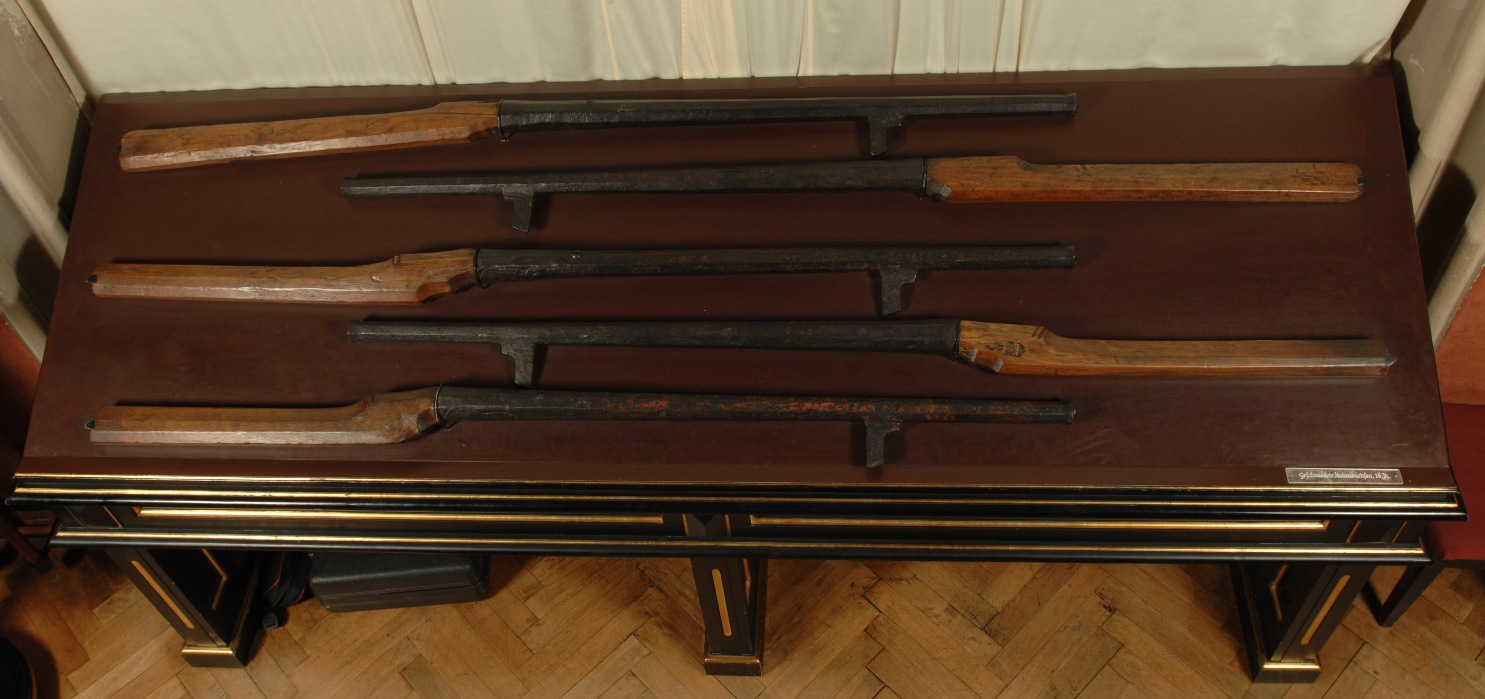
Early arquebuses, the hook guns

Sixteenth-century military writer John Smythe thought that an arquebus could not match the accuracy of a bow in the hands of a highly skilled archer; other military writers such as Humfrey Barwick and Barnabe Rich argued the opposite. An arquebus angled at 35 degrees could throw a bullet up to 1,000 m (3,300 ft) or more. An arquebus shot was considered deadly at up to 400 yards (360 m) while the heavier Spanish musket was considered deadly at up to 600 yards (550 m). During the Japanese Invasions of Korea, Korean officials said they were at a severe disadvantage against Japanese troops because their arquebuses "could reach beyond several hundred paces". In 1590, Smythe noted that arquebusiers and musketeers firing at such extreme distances rarely seemed to hit anything and instead decided to argue effective range, claiming that English archers like the ones from the Hundred Years' War would be more effective at 200–240 yards (180–220 m) than arquebusiers or musketeers, but by that point there were no longer enough skilled archers in England to properly test his theories.

Perhaps the most important advantage of the arquebus over muscle-powered weapons like longbows was sheer power. A shot from a typical 16th-century arquebus boasted between 1,300 to 1,750 J (960 to 1,290 ft⋅lbf) of kinetic energy, depending on the powder quality. A longbow arrow by contrast was about 80 J (59 ft⋅lbf), while crossbows could vary from 100 to 200 J (74 to 148 ft⋅lbf) depending on construction. Thus, arquebuses could easily defeat armor that would be highly effective against arrows or bolts, and inflict far greater wounds on flesh. The disparity was even greater with a 16th-century heavy musket, which were 2,300 to 3,000 J (1,700 to 2,200 ft⋅lbf).

Most high-skilled bowmen achieved a far higher rate of shot than the matchlock arquebus, which took 30–60 seconds to reload properly. The arquebus did, however, have a faster rate of fire than the most powerful crossbow, a shorter learning curve than a longbow, and was more powerful than either. The arquebus did not rely on the physical strength of the user for propulsion of the projectile, making it easier to find a suitable recruit. It also meant that, compared to an archer or crossbowman, an arquebusier lost less of his battlefield effectiveness due to fatigue, malnutrition, or sickness. The arquebusier also had the added advantage of frightening enemies (and horses) with the noise. Wind could reduce the accuracy of archery, but had much less of an effect on an arquebus. During a siege, it was also easier to fire an arquebus out of loopholes than it was a bow and arrow. It was sometimes advocated that an arquebusier should load his weapon with multiple bullets or small shot at close ranges rather than a single ball. Small shot did not pack the same punch as a single round ball but the shot could hit and wound multiple enemies.

An arquebus also has superior penetrating power to a bow or crossbow. Although some plate armors were bulletproof, these armors were unique, heavy, and expensive. A cuirass with a tapul (a front tapered to a forward-facing point) was able to absorb some musket fire due to being angled. Otherwise, most forms of armor a common soldier would wear (especially cloth, light plate, and mail) had little resistance against musket fire. Arrows were relatively weaker in penetration, and crossbows were heavy and required more skill and reload time than the standard bows.

Producing an effective arquebusier required much less training than producing an effective bowman. Most archers spent their whole lives training to shoot with accuracy, but with drill and instruction, the arquebusier was able to learn the profession in months as opposed to years. This low level of skill made it a lot easier to outfit an army in a short amount of time as well as expand the small arms ranks. This idea of lower-skilled, lightly armoured units was the driving force in the infantry revolution that took place in the 16th and 17th centuries and allowed early modern infantries to phase out the longbow.

An arquebusier could carry more ammunition and powder than a crossbowman or longbowman could with bolts or arrows. Once the methods were developed, powder and shot were relatively easy to mass-produce, while arrow making was a genuine craft requiring highly skilled labor.

However, the arquebus was more sensitive to rain, wind, and humid weather. At the Battle of Villalar, rebel troops experienced a significant defeat partially due to having a high proportion of arquebusiers in a rainstorm which rendered the weapons useless. Gunpowder also ages much faster than a bolt or an arrow, particularly if improperly stored. Also, the resources needed to make gunpowder were less universally available than the resources needed to make bolts and arrows. Finding and reusing arrows or bolts was a lot easier than doing the same with arquebus bullets. This was a useful way to reduce the cost of practice or resupply oneself if control of the battlefield after a battle was retained. A bullet must fit a barrel much more precisely than an arrow or bolt must fit a bow or crossbow, so the arquebus required more standardization and this made it harder to resupply by looting bodies of fallen soldiers. Gunpowder production was also far more dangerous than arrow or bolt production.

An arquebus was also significantly more dangerous to its user. The arquebusier carries a lot of gunpowder on his person and has a lit match in one hand. The same goes for the soldiers next to him. Amid the confusion, stress and fumbling of a battle, arquebusiers are potentially a danger to themselves. Early arquebuses tended to have a drastic recoil. They took a long time to load making them vulnerable while reloading unless using the 'continuous fire' tactic, where one line would shoot and, while the next line shot, would reload. They also tended to overheat. During repeated firing, guns could become clogged and explode, which could be dangerous to the gunner and those around him.

Furthermore, the amount of smoke produced by black-powder weapons was considerable, making it hard to see the enemy after a few salvos, unless there was enough wind to disperse the smoke quickly. Conversely, this cloud of smoke also served to make it difficult for any archers to target the opposing soldiers who were using firearms. Before the wheellock, the need for a lit match made stealth and concealment nearly impossible, particularly at night. Even with successful concealment, the smoke emitted by a single arquebus shot would make it quite obvious where the shot came from, at least in daylight. While with a bow or crossbow a soldier could conceivably kill silently, this was of course impossible with an explosion-driven projectile weapon, such as the arquebus. The noise of arquebuses and the ringing in the ears that it caused could also make it hard to hear shouted commands. In the long run, the weapon could make the user permanently hard of hearing. Though bows and crossbows could shoot over obstacles by firing with high-arcing ballistic trajectories they could not do so very accurately or effectively. Sir John Smythe blamed the declining effectiveness of the longbow in part on English commanders who would place firearms at the front of their formations and bowmen at the back, where they could not see their targets and aim appropriately.

== Cultural references ==
Arquebuse de L'Hermitage, a clear spirit made by macerating and distilling a large variety of plants, was supposedly invented in 1857 by a herbalist of the Marist Brothers in the Hermitage Monastery in Saint-Genis-Laval, France although other sources assert it was produced in France and Piedmont since the 18th century. Its name has been ascribed to the sensation of drinking it and to its use in treating the wounded. It remains in production by various companies and is drunk as a digestif.

== See also ==
- List of firearms before the 20th century
- Blunderbuss
- Tanegashima
