= Tanegashima (gun) =

Japanese snap matchlock firearm

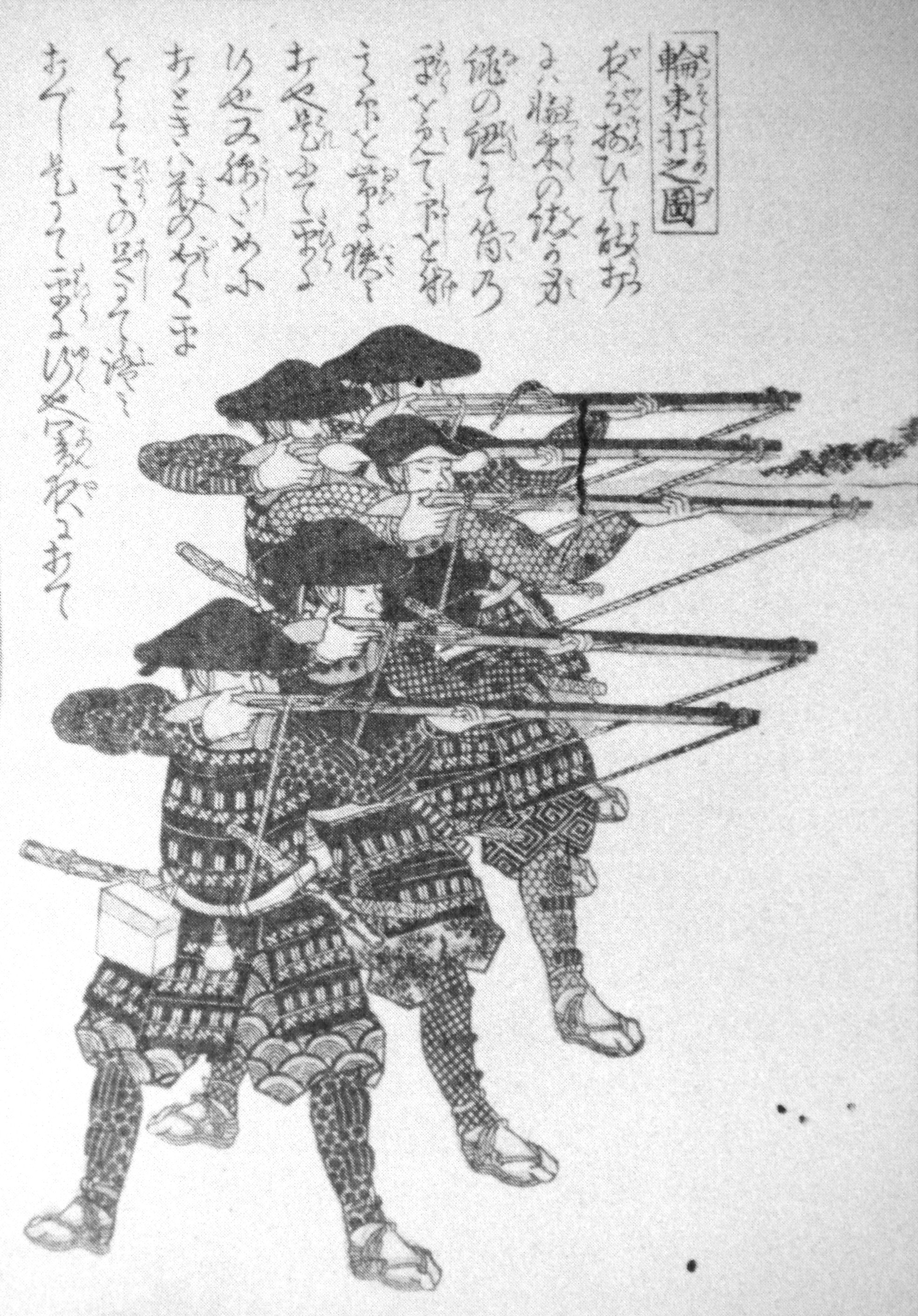
Japanese ashigaru firing hinawajū. Night-shooting practice, using ropes to maintain proper firing elevation.

Tanegashima (種子島), most often called in Japanese and sometimes in English hinawajū (火縄銃, "matchlock gun"), was a type of matchlock-configured arquebus firearm introduced to Japan through the Portuguese Empire in 1543. It was used by the samurai class and their ashigaru "foot soldiers", and within a few years its introduction in battle changed the way war was fought in Japan forever. It, however, could not completely replace the yumi (bow). Although the Japanese developed various techniques to improve the gun's shortcomings, specifically its slow rate of fire and inability to fire in the rain, it remained inferior to the yumi in these respects, and the latter continued to be an important weapon on the battlefield. After Tokugawa Ieyasu destroyed the Toyotomi clan in the siege of Osaka and established the Tokugawa shogunate, the relatively peaceful Edo period arrived, and the use of tanegashima declined.

== History ==
=== Origins ===
The tanegashima seems to have been based on snap matchlocks that were produced in the armory of Goa in Portuguese India, which was captured by the Portuguese in 1510. The name tanegashima came from the Japanese island (Tanegashima) where a Chinese junk with two Portuguese adventurers on board was driven to anchor by a storm in 1543. The lord of the Japanese island, Tanegashima Tokitaka (1528–1579), purchased two matchlock muskets from the Portuguese and put a swordsmith to work copying the matchlock barrel and firing mechanism. The smith, Yaita Kinbee Kiyosoda, did not have much of a problem with most of the gun but "drilling the barrel helically so that the screw (bisen bolt) could be tightly inserted" was a major problem as this "technique did not apparently exist in Japan until this time." The Portuguese fixed their ship and left the island, and only in the next year, when a Portuguese blacksmith was brought back to Japan, was the problem solved.

=== Sengoku period ===
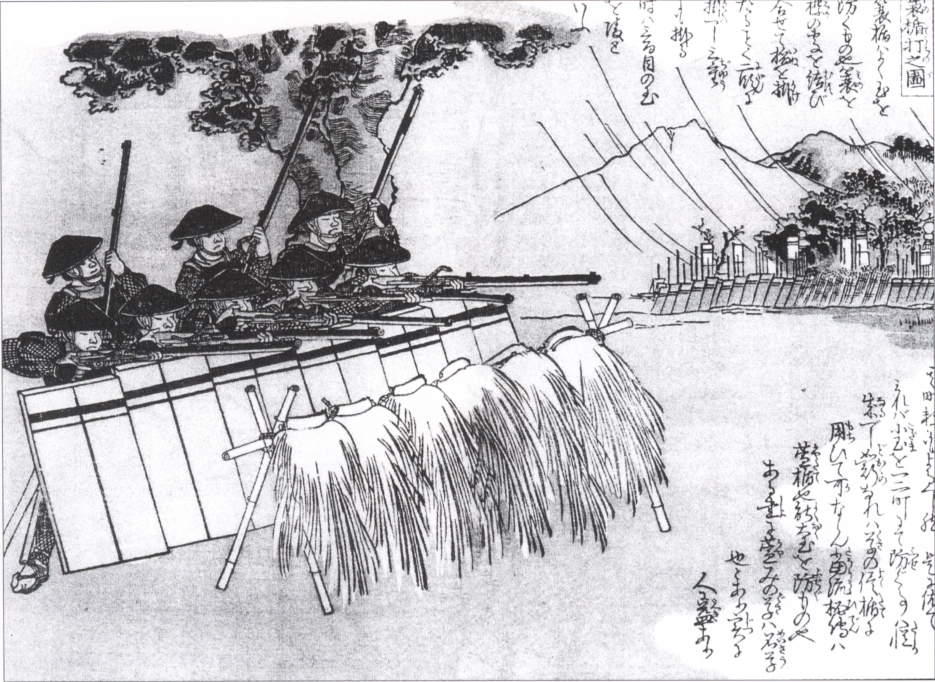
Ashigaru using tanegashima from behind wooden pavises

Much of Japan was involved with internecine wars during the Sengoku period (1467–1603), as feudal lords vied for supremacy. Matchlock guns were introduced midway through the period and saw extensive use in the later years of the conflict, playing a decisive role on the battlefield. In 1549, Oda Nobunaga ordered 500 guns to be produced for his armies at a time when the benefits of firearms over traditional weapons were still relatively questionable to other daimyō. However the new firearm had undoubted advantages in range in comparison with traditional bows. In addition, bullets could penetrate almost any armor and shield. Joseon official Yu Sŏngnyong quoted:

In the 1592 invasion, everything was swept away. Within a fortnight or a month the cities and fortresses were lost, and everything in the eight directions had crumbled. Although it was [partly] due to there having been a century of peace and the people not being familiar with warfare that this happened, it was really because the Japanese had the use of muskets that could reach beyond several hundred paces, that always pierced what they struck, that came like the wind and the hail, and with which bows and arrows could not compare.

The Japanese soon worked on various techniques to improve the effectiveness of their guns. They developed a staggered firing technique to create a continuous rain of bullets on the enemy. They also developed larger caliber barrels and ammunition to increase lethality. Protective boxes in lacquerware were invented to fit over the firing mechanism so it could still fire while it was raining, as were systems to accurately fire weapons at night by keeping fixed angles thanks to measured strings. Another development would be the hayago, a bamboo cartridge used to facilitate faster reloading. A hollow tube open at both ends, the hayago contained gunpowder, wadding, and a bullet. Upon tearing open the tube's paper seal at the bottom, a soldier could quickly use it to pour the necessary powder into his weapon before placing over the barrel and using his rammer to load both wadding and bullet into the barrel at the same time. After use, the hayago could be kept for repacking or discarded.

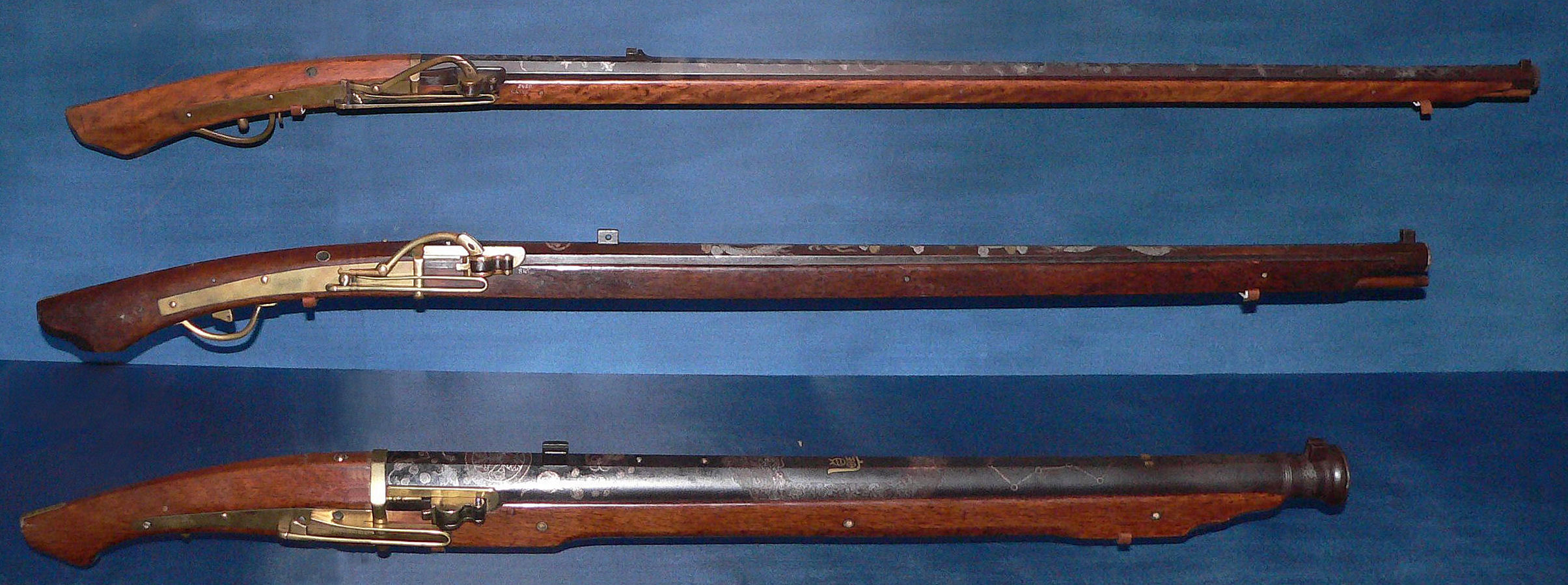
Various antique tanegashima

In 1563 the Amago clan of Izumo Province won a victory over the Kikkawa clan with 33 of their adversaries wounded by tanegashima. In 1567, Takeda Shingen announced that, "Hereafter, the guns will be the most important arms, therefore decrease the number of spears per unit, and have your most capable men carry guns". Oda Nobunaga used tanegashima in the Battle of Anegawa (1570), and again against the powerful Takeda clan in the Battle of Nagashino (1575), 3,000 gunners helped win the battle, firing by volleys of a thousand at a time. They were concealed across a river and used breastworks to effectively stop enemy infantry and cavalry charges while being protected. The defeat of the powerful Takeda clan brought about permanent changes in battle tactics. In the Battle of Numajiri (1584), Satake Yoshishige won against Hojo clan, due in part to the use of over 8600 matchlock rifles by their troops. The soldiers led by Date Masamune were 70% armed with guns.

Japan became so enthusiastic about the new weapons that it possibly overtook every European country in absolute numbers produced. Japan also used the guns in the Japanese invasion of Korea in 1592, in which about a quarter of the invasion force of 160,000 were gunners. They were extremely successful at first and managed to capture Seoul just 18 days after their landing at Busan.

=== Edo period ===
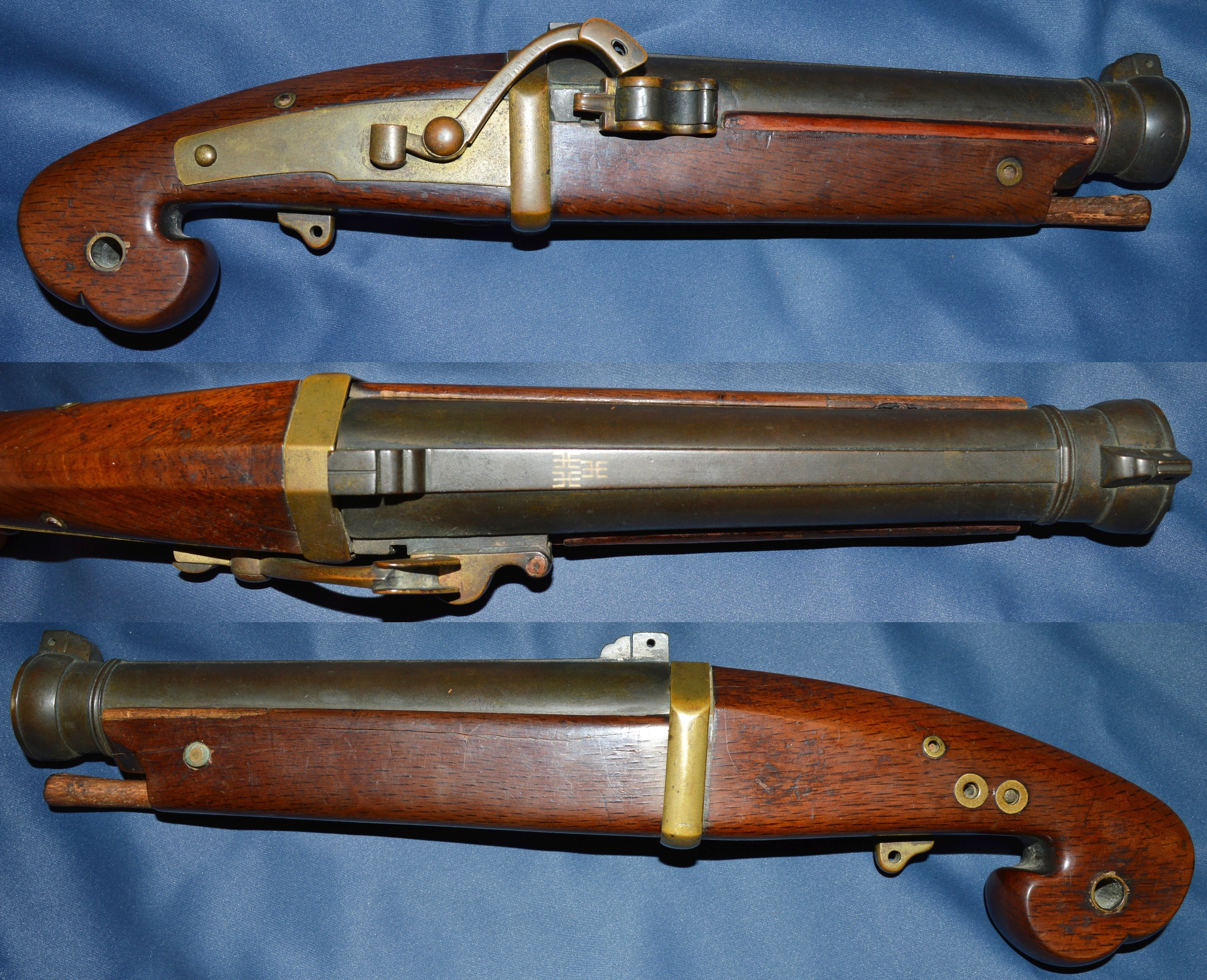
Antique Japanese samurai tanegashima pistol

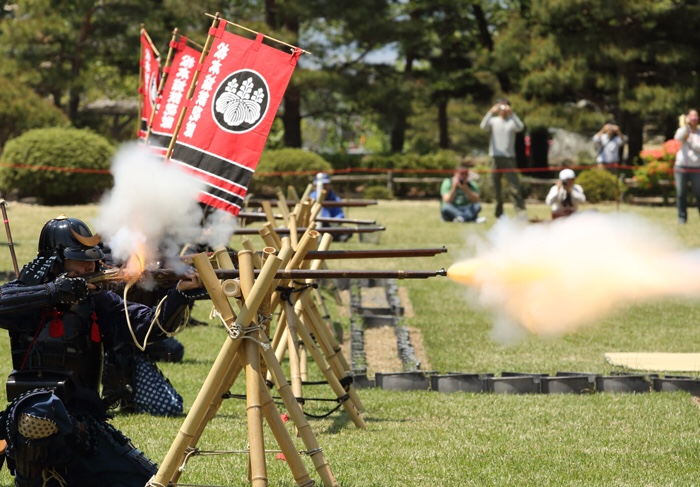
Modern tanegashima matchlock reenactors in Japan

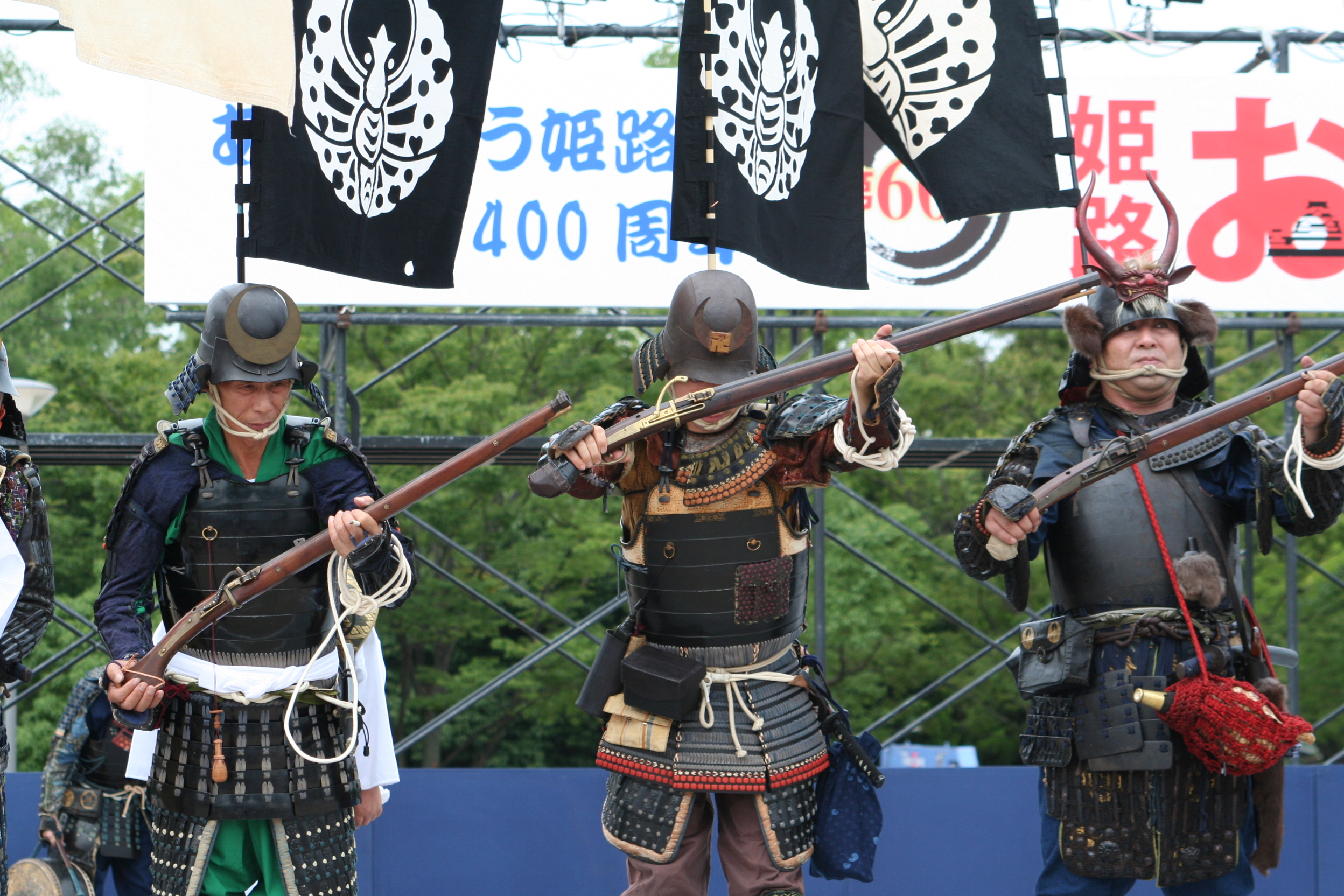
Reenactors with tanegashima at Himeji Castle Festival

The internal war for control of Japan was won by Tokugawa Ieyasu, who defeated his rivals at the Battle of Sekigahara in October 1600. Three years later, he established the Tokugawa shogunate, a powerful entity that would maintain peace, stability, and prosperity in Japan for the following 250 years. This is known as the Edo period (1603–1868). From the mid-17th century, Japan decided to close itself to interaction with the West except for the Dutch Republic through its policy of sakoku. Contrary to popular belief, this did not lead to Japan "giving up the gun"; if anything, the gun was used less frequently because the Edo period did not have many large-scale conflicts in which a gun would be of use. Often the katana was simply the more practical weapon in the average small-scale conflicts.

Isolation did not eliminate the production of guns in Japan—on the contrary, there is evidence of around 200 gunsmiths in Japan by the end of the Edo period. However, the social life of firearms had changed: as the historian David L. Howell has argued, for many in Japanese society, the gun had become less a weapon than a farm implement for scaring off animals. With no external enemies for over 200 years, tanegashima were mainly used by samurai for hunting and target practice, the majority were relegated to the arms store houses of the daimyō.

The arrival in Japan of the United States Navy led by Matthew C. Perry in 1854 started a period of rearmament. The tanegashima was an antiquated weapon by the 1800s and various samurai factions acquired advanced firearms including the minié rifle, breech-loading and repeating rifles. The samurai era ended in 1868 with the Meiji period; Japan turned to a national conscription army with modern weapons and uniforms. Some gunsmiths did replace their matchlock-type tanegashima into percussion cap mechanisms while retaining its design as a musket. The last use of samurai armour and traditional weapons in Japan, including tanegashima, was during the Satsuma Rebellion (1877), when the Meiji government's newly established Imperial Japanese Army put an end to the last samurai and their resistance to modernization.

==== Classifications of different guns ====
Japanese arquebuses are classified by the location of their native gunsmiths as well as with the weight of the ball by momme.

===== Ban-zutsu (numbered cylinder) =====
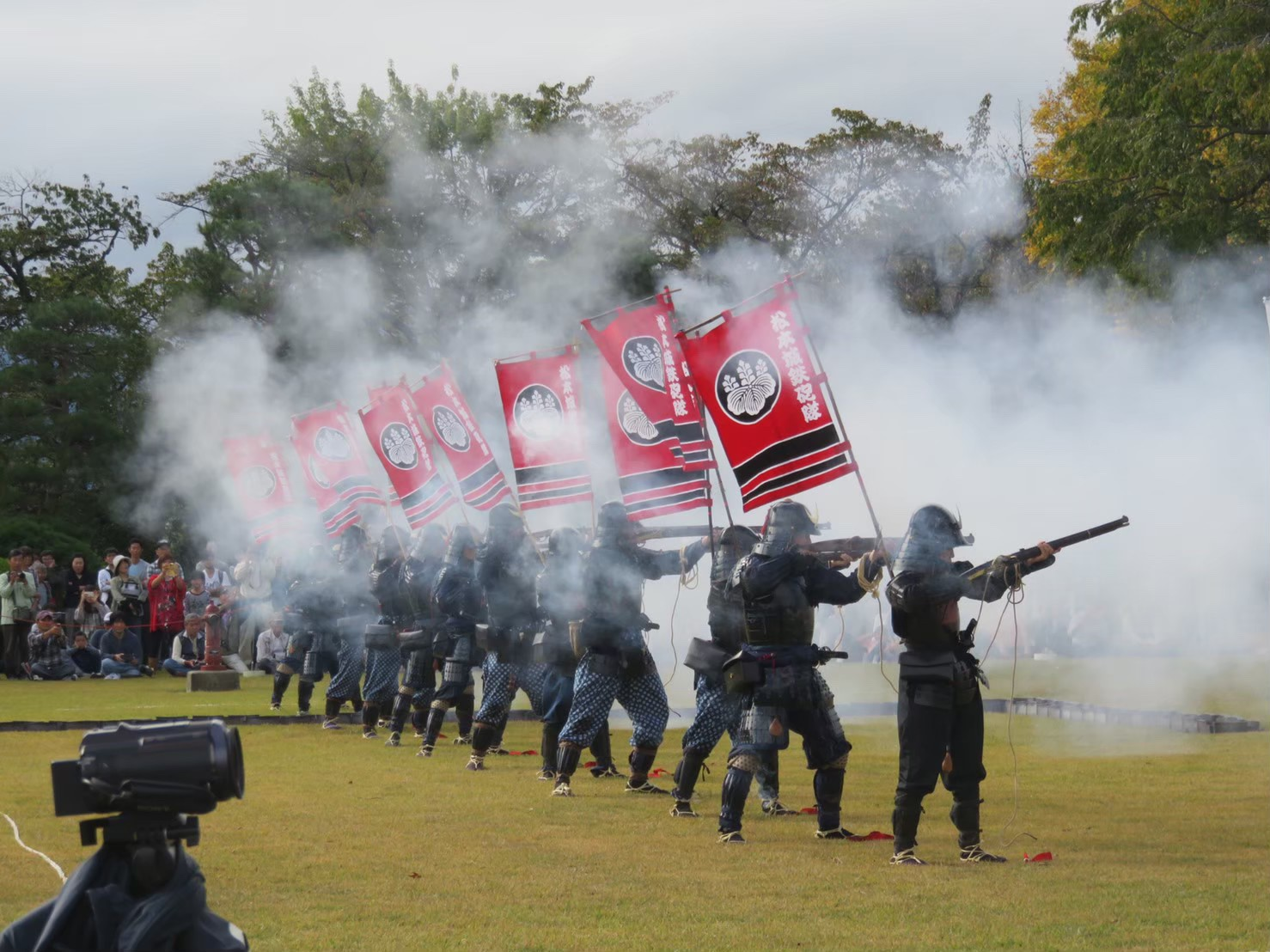
Ashigaru with ban-zutsu

The most common users of the tanegashima were peasant foot soldiers commanded by the samurai, the ashigaru. Where warfare changed during the Sengoku era exponentially with massed pike, archer, and eventually arquebus formations, large quantities of guns were needed and produced to equip the teppogumi (gun units) of the feudal Japanese armies.

As these guns were primarily used by the ashigaru, they were of low quality and were stored in arsenals where they could be used again.

===== Tan-zutsu (small cylinder) =====
Tan-zutsu were generally matchlock pistols that due to their inferior range and firepower compared to the ban-zutsu, were not best suited in open field battles and were instead used as status symbols for mounted samurai. They were occasionally used for self-defense by high ranking commanders.

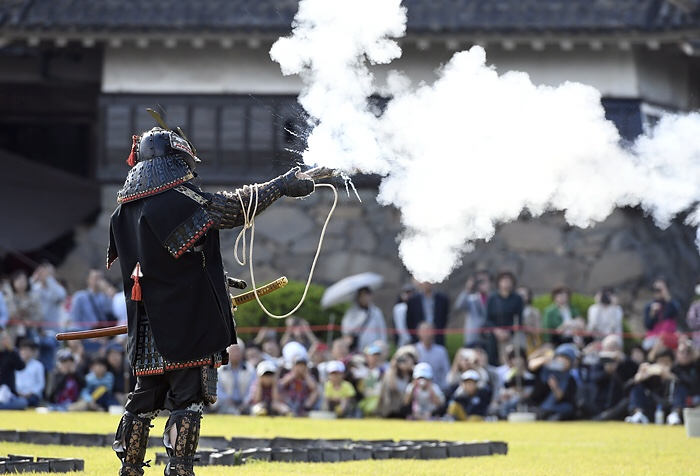
Tan-zutsu

===== Chu-zutsu (middle cylinder) =====
At the advent of firearms, Japanese armies had to come up with reliable ways of repelling the widespread use of guns; whether it would be the creation of full plated and soon bullet-proof armor, bulletproof bundles of bamboo called taketaba or heavy iron pavises. With the caliber of the ban-zutsu being too weak to penetrate these protection methods, a new, yet harder to handle and expensive gun with a larger gun caliber was needed to equip the ashigaru formations that encountered these obstacles; the chu-zutsu was such a solution.

===== O-zutsu (great cylinder) =====
Guns of the o-zutsu caliber (20 momme (≈ 75 g (2.6 oz)) and more) were practically portable hand cannons and were used as siege weapons employed to knock down the hinges of gates as well as powerful anti-personnel and anti-cavalry weapons.

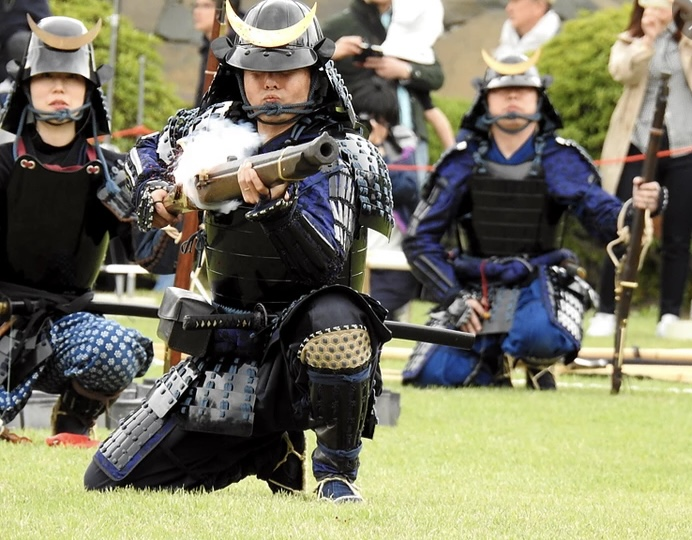
O-zutsu

A gun of this size was typically hard to operate (though varying on the momme), requiring plentiful amounts of gunpowder and proper training. One of the issues of operating such device was the powerful recoil and the difficulty of transporting, where sometimes larger o-zutsu were either rested on rice bales, hung from trees using ropes, or installed on a carriage (similar to European cannons).

===== Samurai-zutsu (samurai cylinder) =====
The samurai-zutsu guns were custom-made for use only by the samurai, whose high social standing and wealth meant they could afford well-crafted and intricately designed guns which were longer and of larger caliber, as opposed to the cruder and inferior quality ban-zutsu used by the ashigaru.

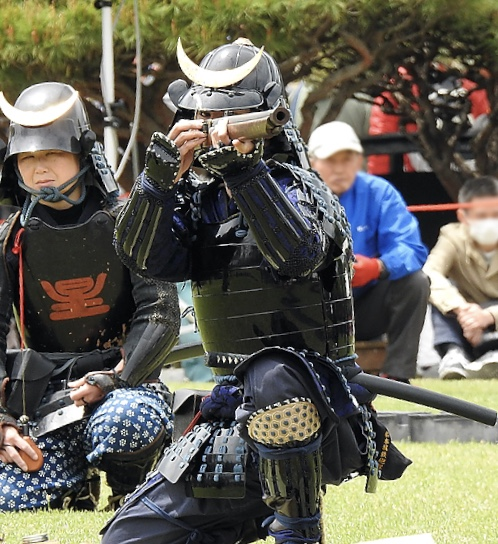
Samurai-zutsu

===== Hazama/Zama-zutsu (loop hole/hole cylinder) =====
Hazama-zutsu or zama-zutsu guns were generally longer than most guns and had a smaller caliber than even the ban-zutsu. These guns were used on castles and ships primarily as long range defensive weapons.

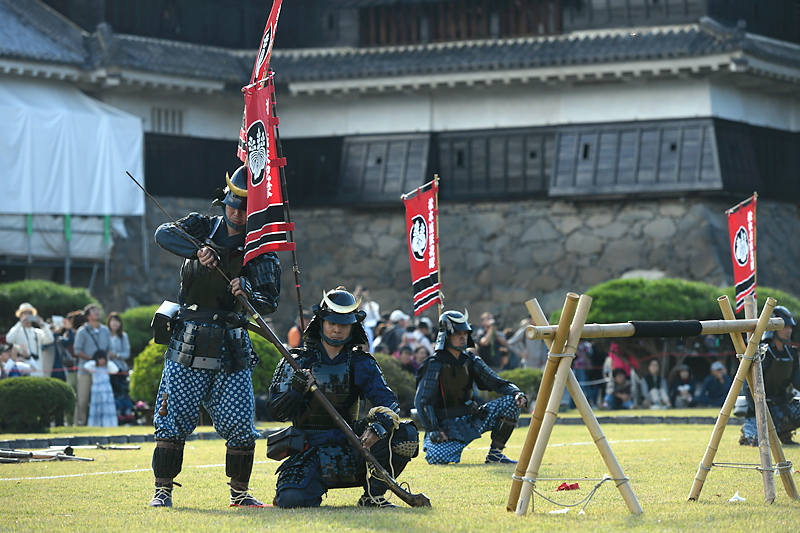
Gunners from the Matsumoto Castle Gun Corps loading a zama-zutsu

===== Bajo-zutsu (horse riding cylinder) =====
As the tan-zutsu became a status symbol among the kibatai (cavalry), it eventually made its way into becoming a cavalry gun. These guns were similar in structure to the tan-zutsu, but had a longer barrel and were fairly easy to reload on horseback.

===== Shateki-zutsu (target cylinder) =====
Shateki-zutsu were made purely for the purpose of target practice.

=== Modern use ===
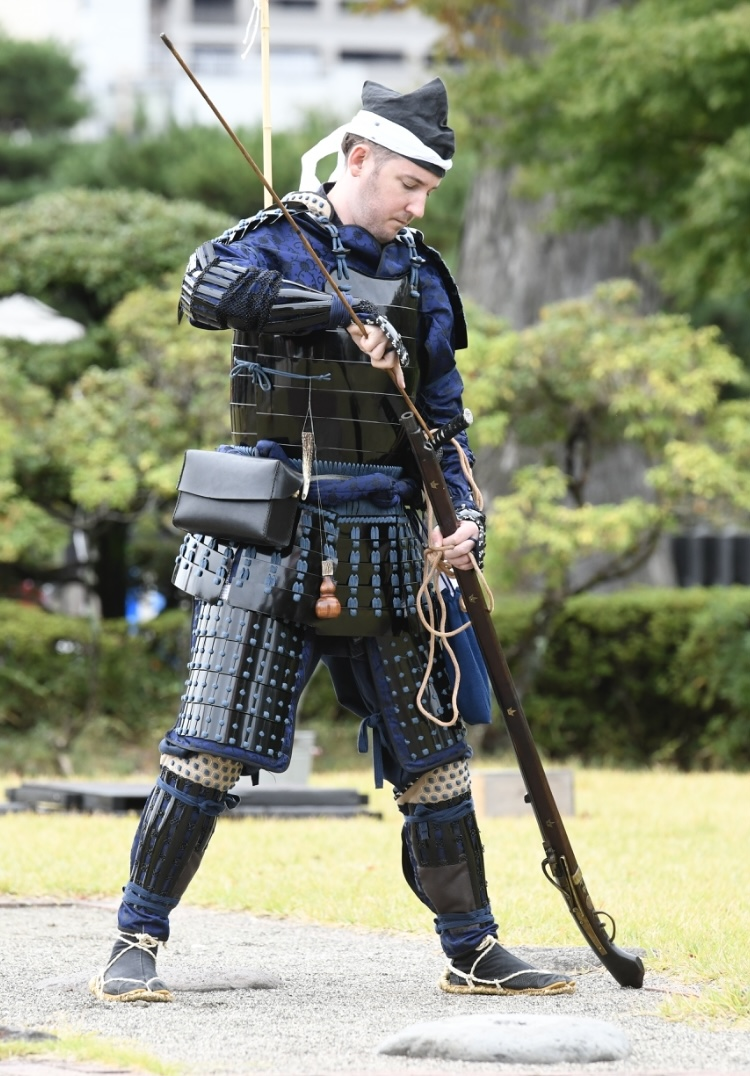
A modern hōjutsu gunner

Today tanegashima are readily available from sellers of antique firearms and dealers of samurai antiques both in Japan and the West. Modern tanegashima gun troops in Japan re-enact the use of tanegashima in battle, and black powder enthusiasts use tanegashima for target practice.

== Parts ==
- Shiba-hikigane – Butt protector
- Hikigane – Trigger
- Karakuri – Lock
- Jiita – Plate
- Yuojintetsu – Trigger guard
- Biyu – Rivet
- Hinawa tōshi ana – Hole for the matchcord
- Hajiki gane – Spring
- Dugane – Stock ring
- Hibasami – Hammer arm
- Amaoi – Barrel protector
- Hibuta – Pancover
- Hizara – Pantray
- Dai – Stock
- Tsutsu – Barrel
- Moto maete – Rear sight
- Udenuki – Sling hole
- Naka maete – Middle sight
- Mekugi ana – Pin hole
- Saki maete – Front sight
- Karuka – Ramrod
- Suguchi – Muzzle

== Gallery ==
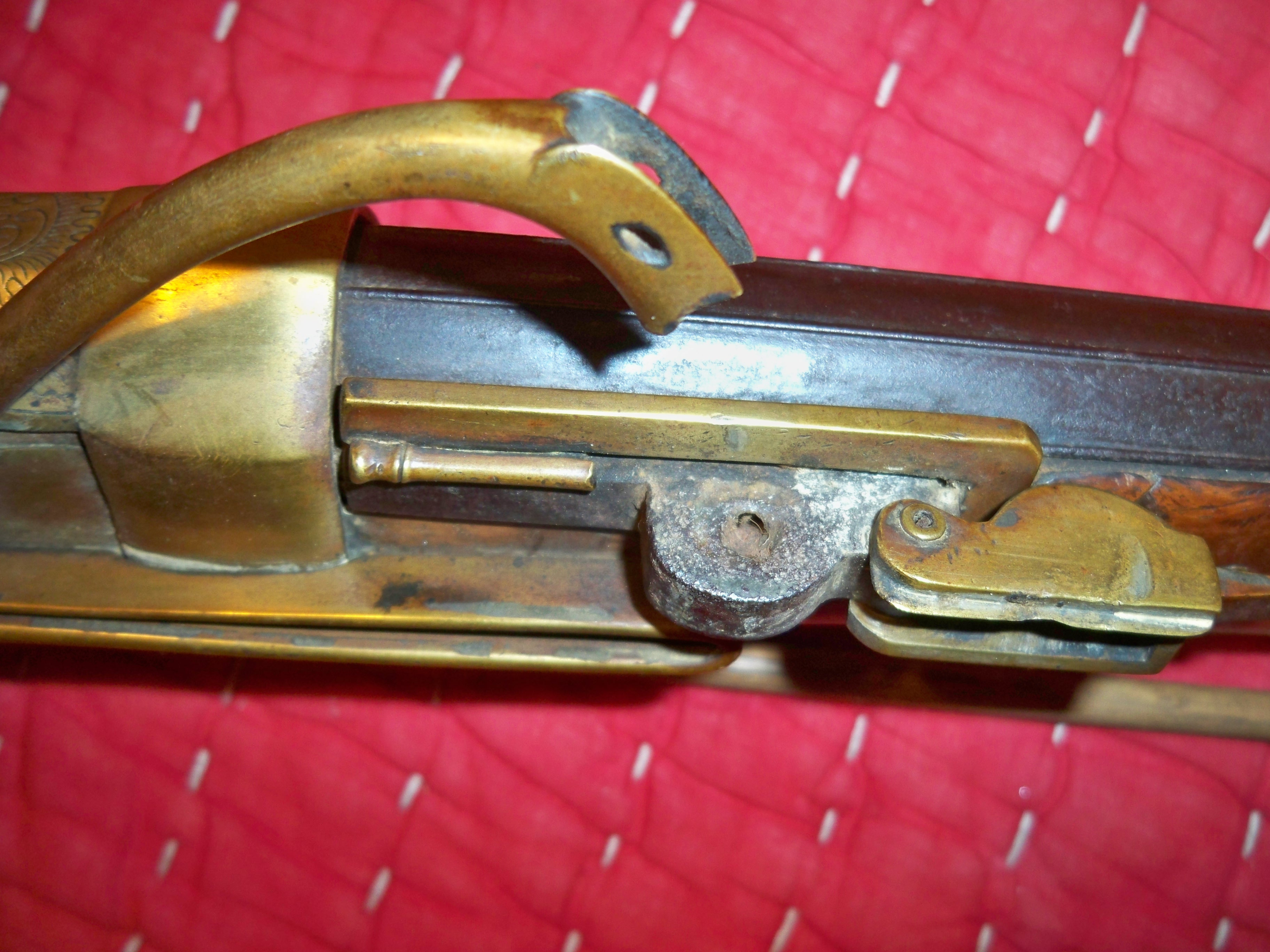
Edo-period tanegashima firing mechanism

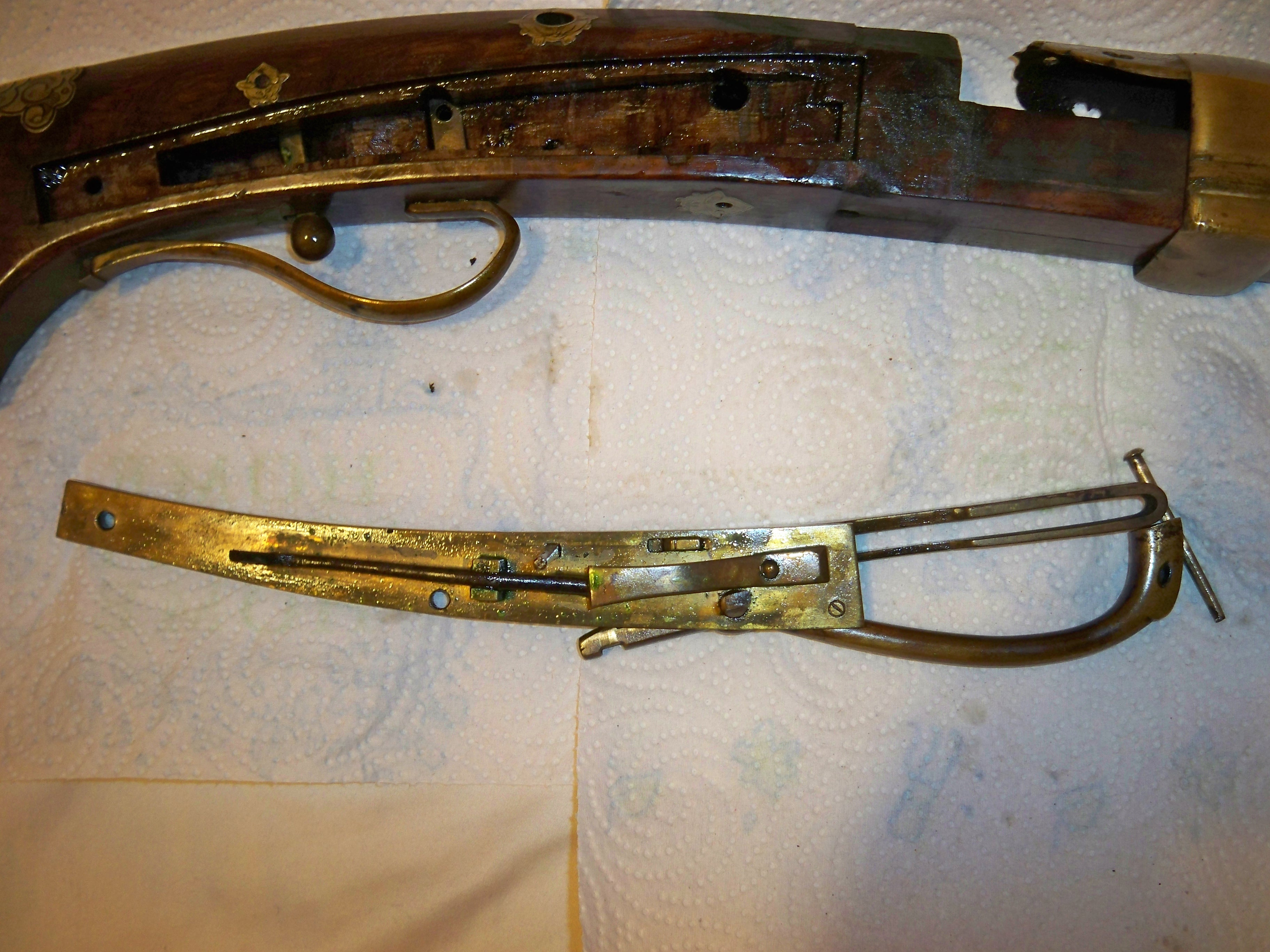
The inside of the arquebus's firing mechanism

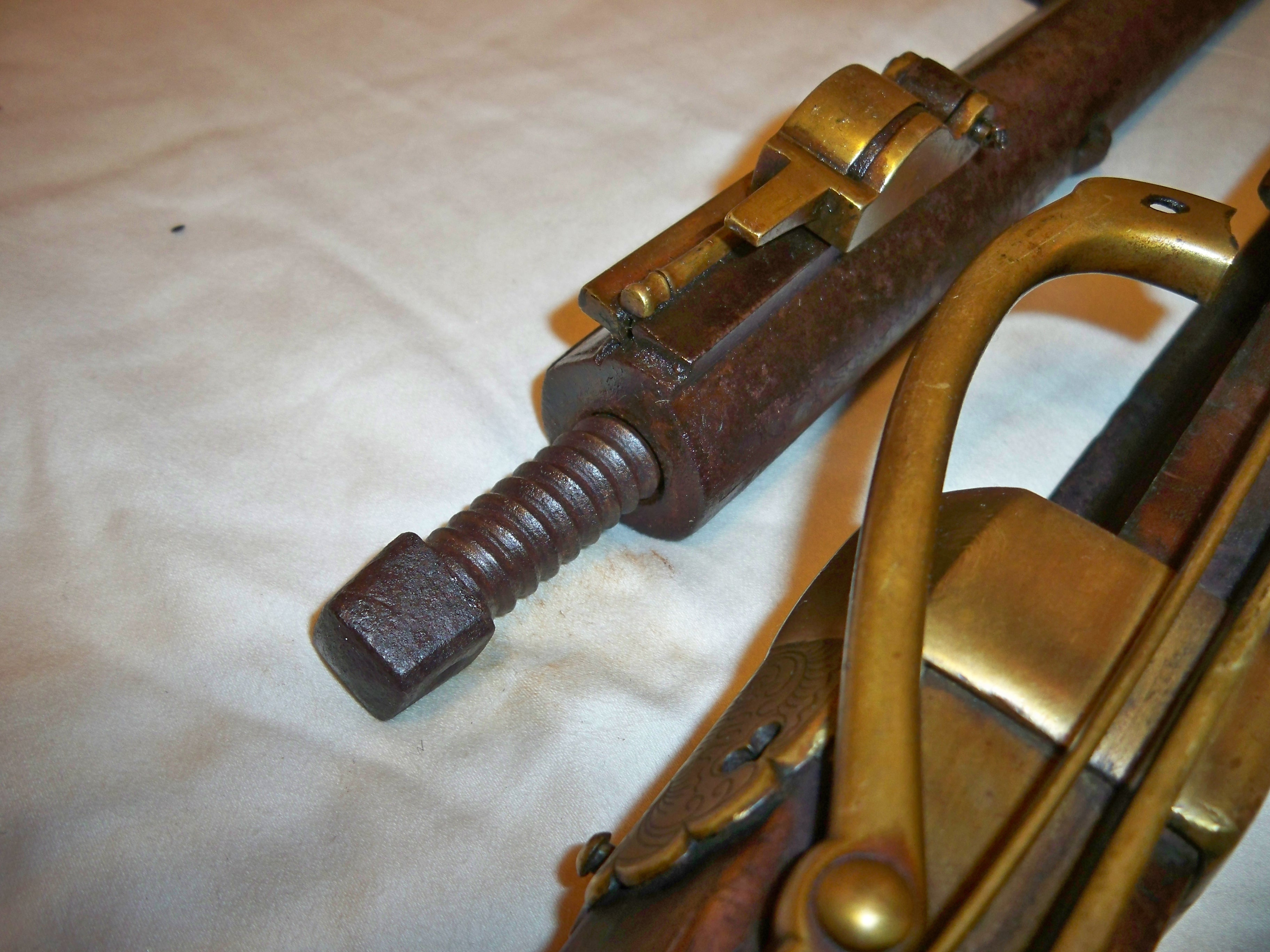
Edo-period tanegashima showing the barrel bolt

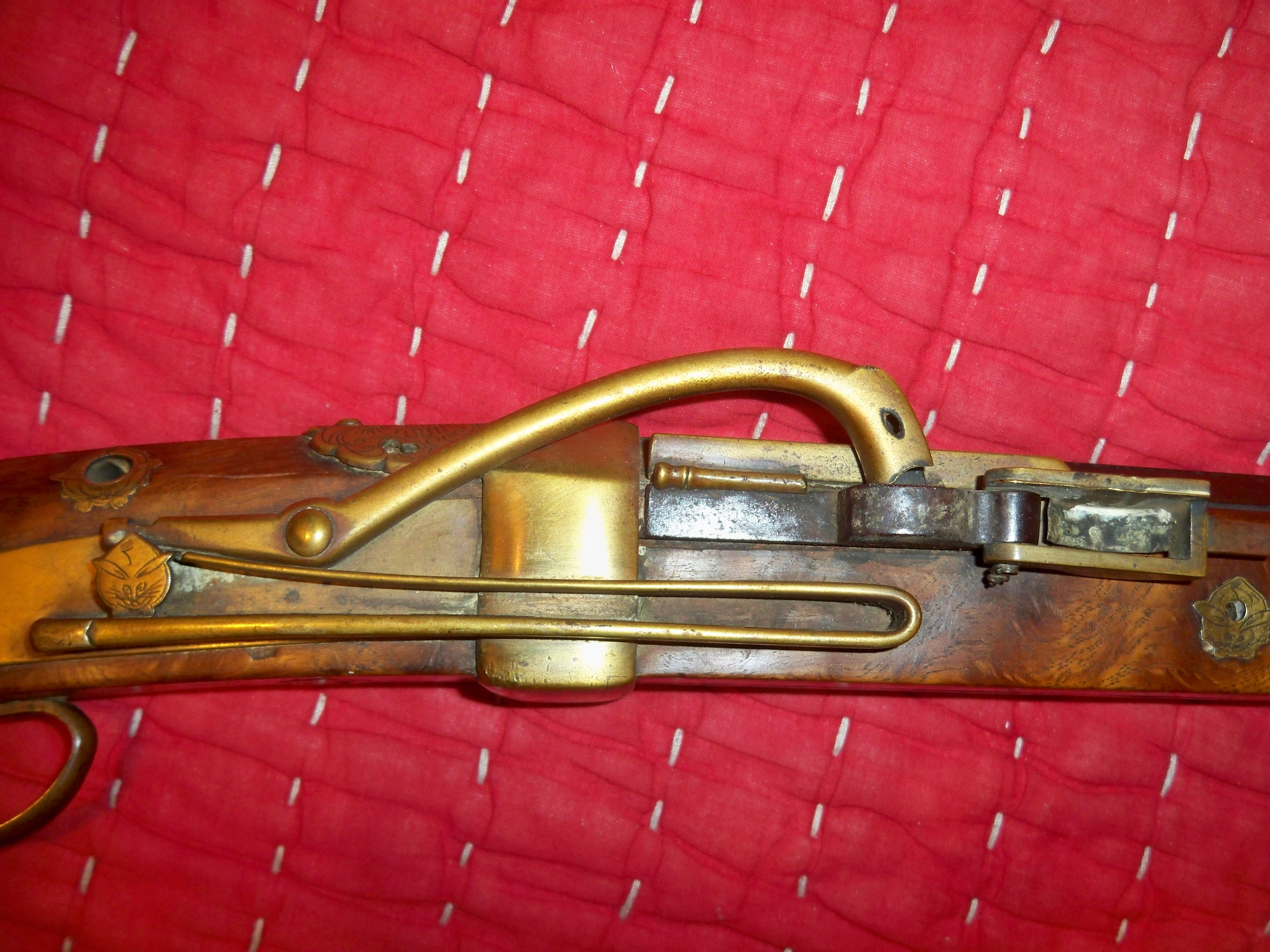
Edo-period tanegashima firing mechanism

== See also ==
- Nanban trade period
- Java arquebus
- Istinggar
- Jiaozhi arquebus
