= Snap matchlock =

Type of matchlock mechanism used to ignite early firearms

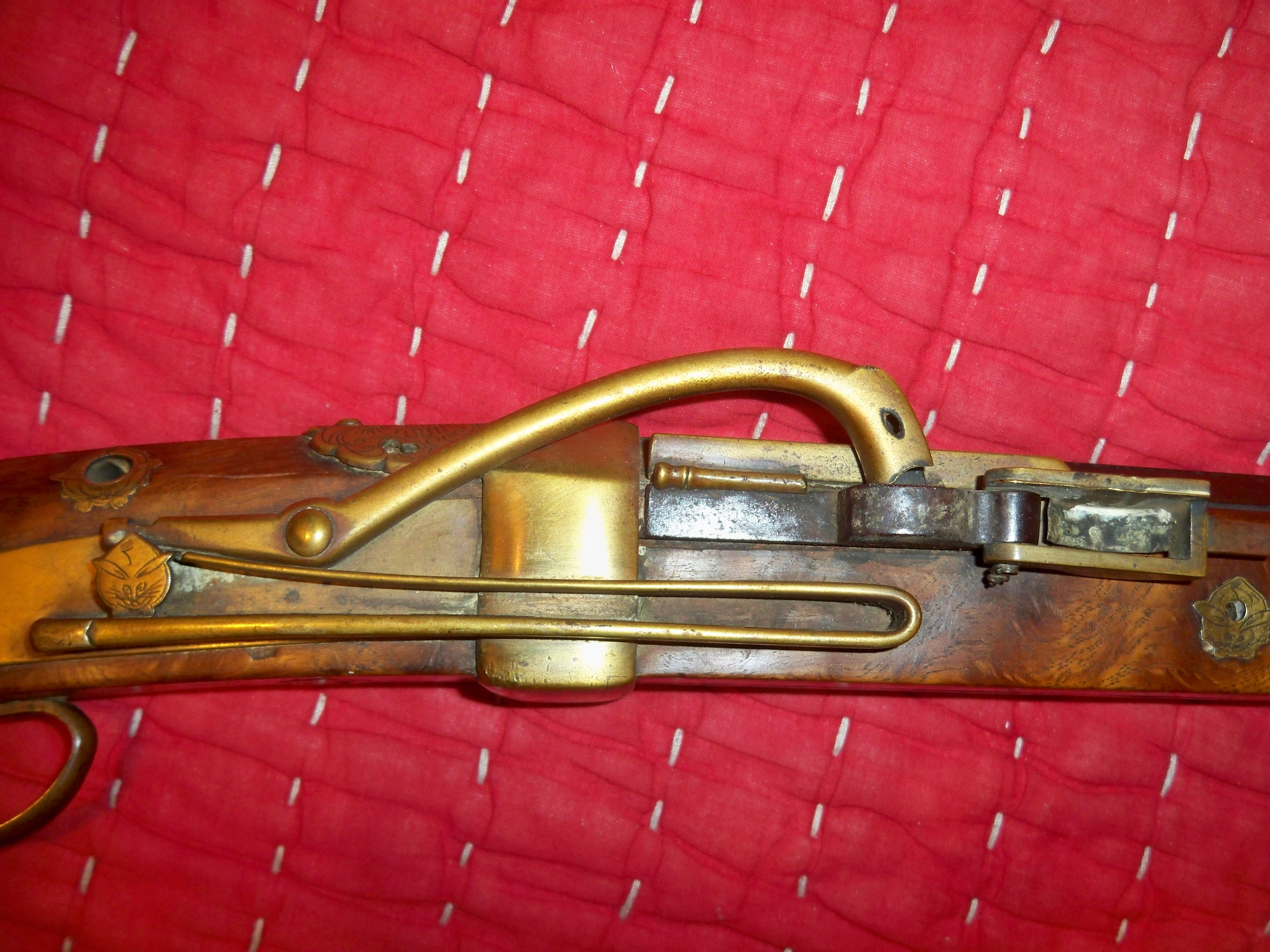
Antique Japanese matchlock (tanegashima), showing the firing mechanism. Note the V-shaped mainspring.

The snap matchlock is a type of matchlock mechanism used to ignite early firearms. It was used in Europe from about 1475 to 1640, and in Japan from 1543 until about 1880, and was also largely used by Korea (Joseon) from the 16th century Imjin War to the early 20th century.

== Description ==
The serpentine (a curved lever with a clamp on the end) was held in firing position by a weak spring, and released by pressing a button, pulling a trigger, or even pulling a short string passing into the mechanism. The slow match held in the serpentine swung into a flash pan containing priming powder. The flash from the flash pan travelled through the touch hole igniting the main propellant charge of the gun. As the match was often extinguished after its relatively violent collision with the flash pan, this type fell out of favour with soldiers, but was often used in fine target weapons.

In Japan the first documented introduction of the matchlock which became known as the tanegashima was through the Portuguese in 1543. The tanegashima seems to have been based on snap matchlocks that were produced in the armory of Goa in Portuguese India, which was captured by Portugal in 1510. There were two different lock mechanisms used in Indo-Portuguese matchlock guns. One has a single leaf mainspring of the Lusitanian gun prototypes, which can be found in Ceylon, the Malay peninsula, Sumatra, and Vietnam, and the other has a V-shaped mainspring, and can be found in Java, Bali, China, Japan, and Korea.

== See also ==
- Black powder
- Gonne
- Matchlock
- Muzzle-loading
