= Wajik =

Southeast Asian glutinous sweet

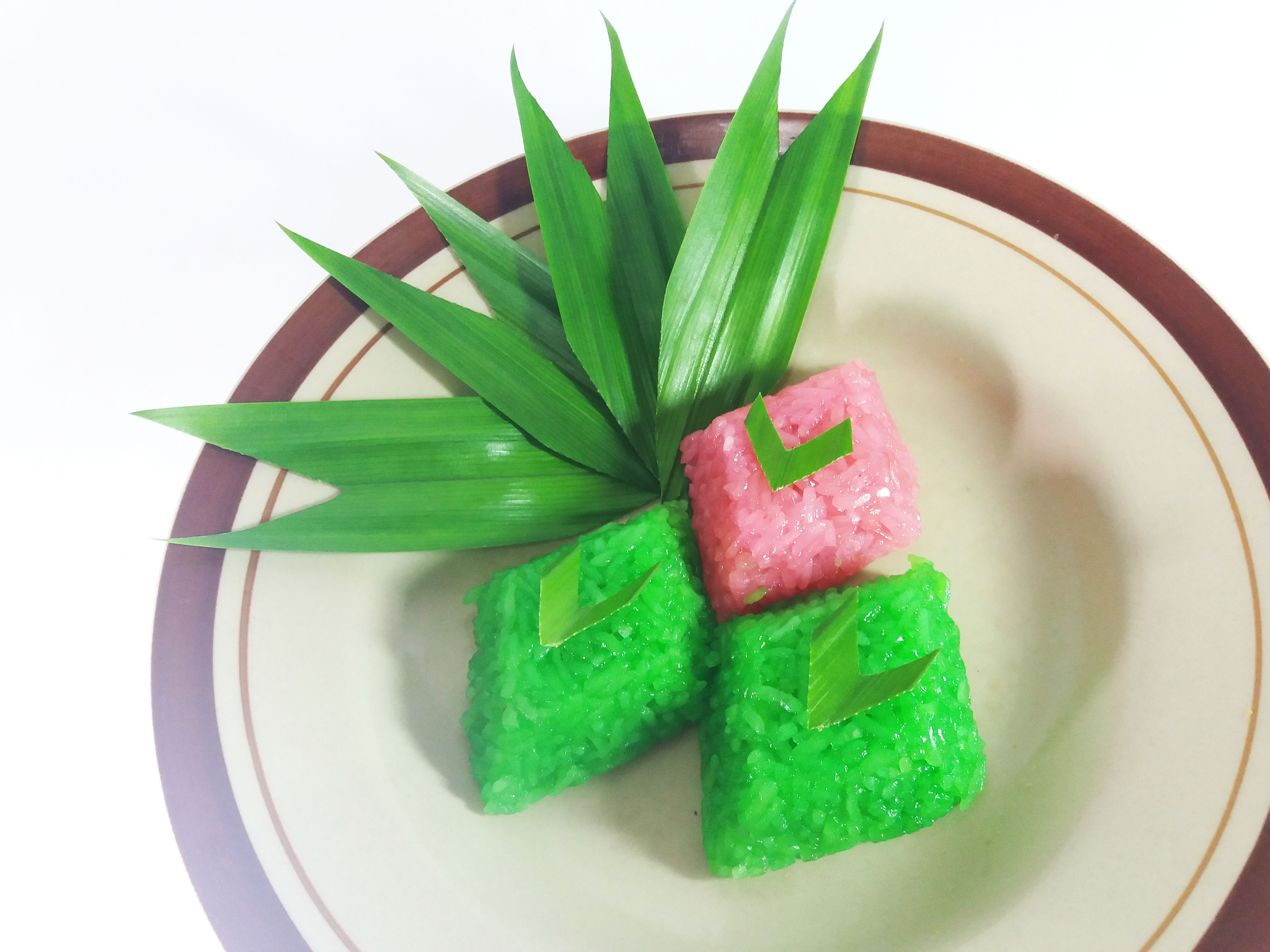
- Indonesian rhombus-shaped wajik
- Alternative names: Wajid, pulut manis
- Type: Kue, kuih
- Course: Snack
- Place of origin: Indonesia.
- Region or state: Java
- Associated cuisine: Brunei, Indonesia, Malaysia, Singapore
- Serving temperature: Room temperature
- Main ingredients: Glutinous rice, sugar, coconut milk
- Variations: Wajik kelapa, Wajik klethik, Wajid Jawa

Wajik or wajid, also known as pulut manis, is a traditional glutinous sweet made with rice, sugar and coconut milk. It is an Indonesian kue, and a kuih of Brunei, Singapore and Malaysia (especially in the state of Sabah).

== Definition ==
The official Indonesian dictionary describes wajik as a confectionery made from a mixture of sticky rice, sugar, and coconut milk and cut into diamond shapes (rhombus or parallelogram).

== Ingredients and shapes ==
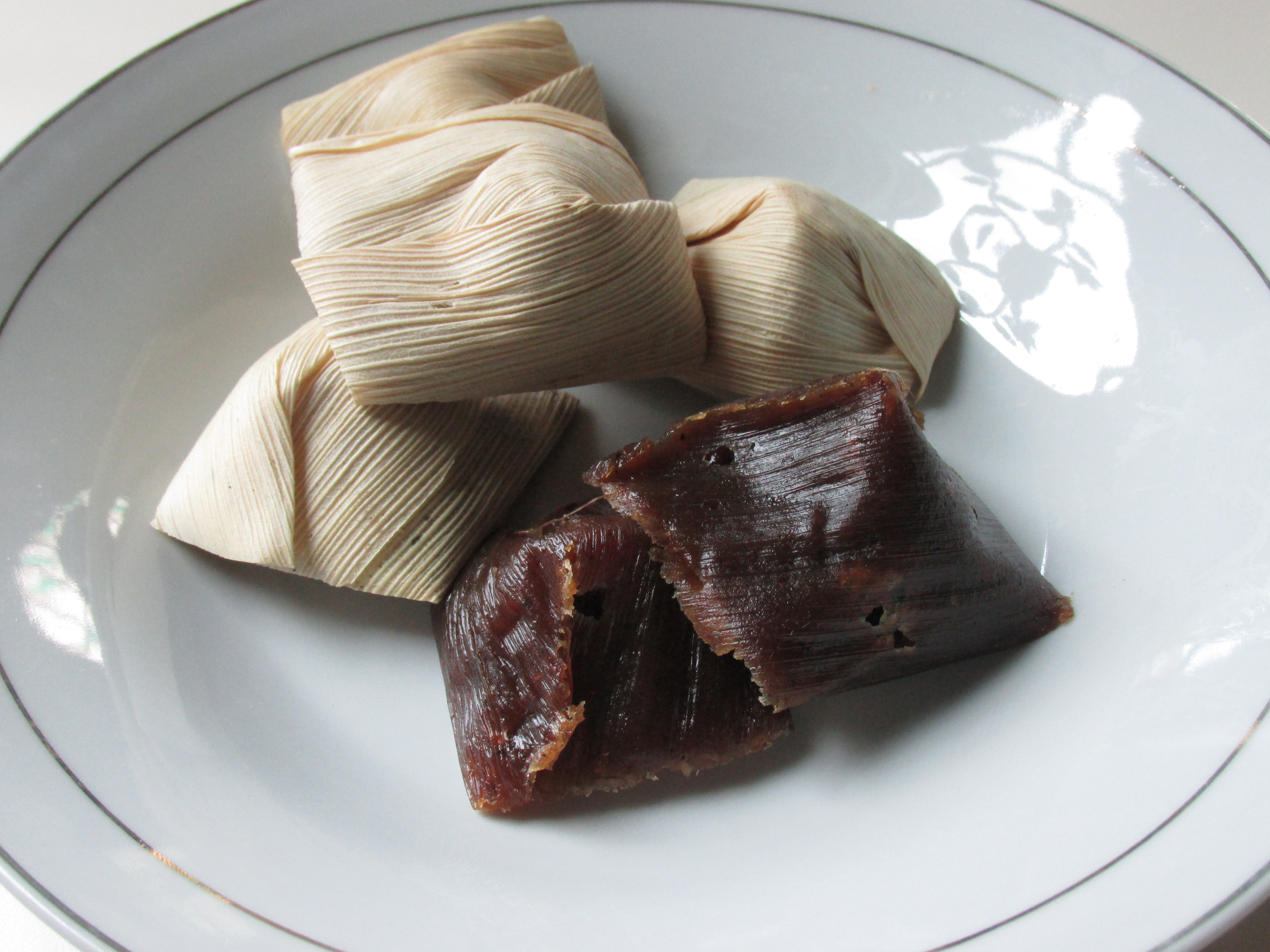
Wajik kelapa or coconut wajik wrapped in dried corn husks.

The main ingredients of wajik are glutinous rice, palm sugar, and coconut milk. The high content of sugar serves as a natural preservative since sugar inhibits the growth of microbes. A correctly produced and packaged wajik could last for up to two weeks. To enhance the aroma, wajik is often enhanced with aromatic ingredients such as pandan, vanilla, or brown sugar and durian. A variant called wajik kelapa uses coconut and palm sugar.

Wajik have various shapes, but the most famous one is the rhombus or parallelogram. In Indonesia, several shapes of wajik include square, rectangular, rhombus, parallelogram, cylindrical, and rounded. They can be served bare or wrapped inside banana leaves or dyed corn husks.

== Origin ==
Wajik is believed to originate from Java, Indonesia. Dishes and confectionaries with the combination of sticky rice and palm sugar have a long history in Java. One of the earliest mentions of wajik is found in the Javanese manuscript Nawaruci, written by Empu Siwamurti and dated from the Majapahit period.

Subsequently, wajik has occupied certain roles in Javanese tradition, for example, the Numplak Wajik or Tumplak Wajik ceremony, held by Keraton Yogyakarta as part of Grebeg Muludan during the Sekaten festival.

== Variations ==
=== Brunei ===
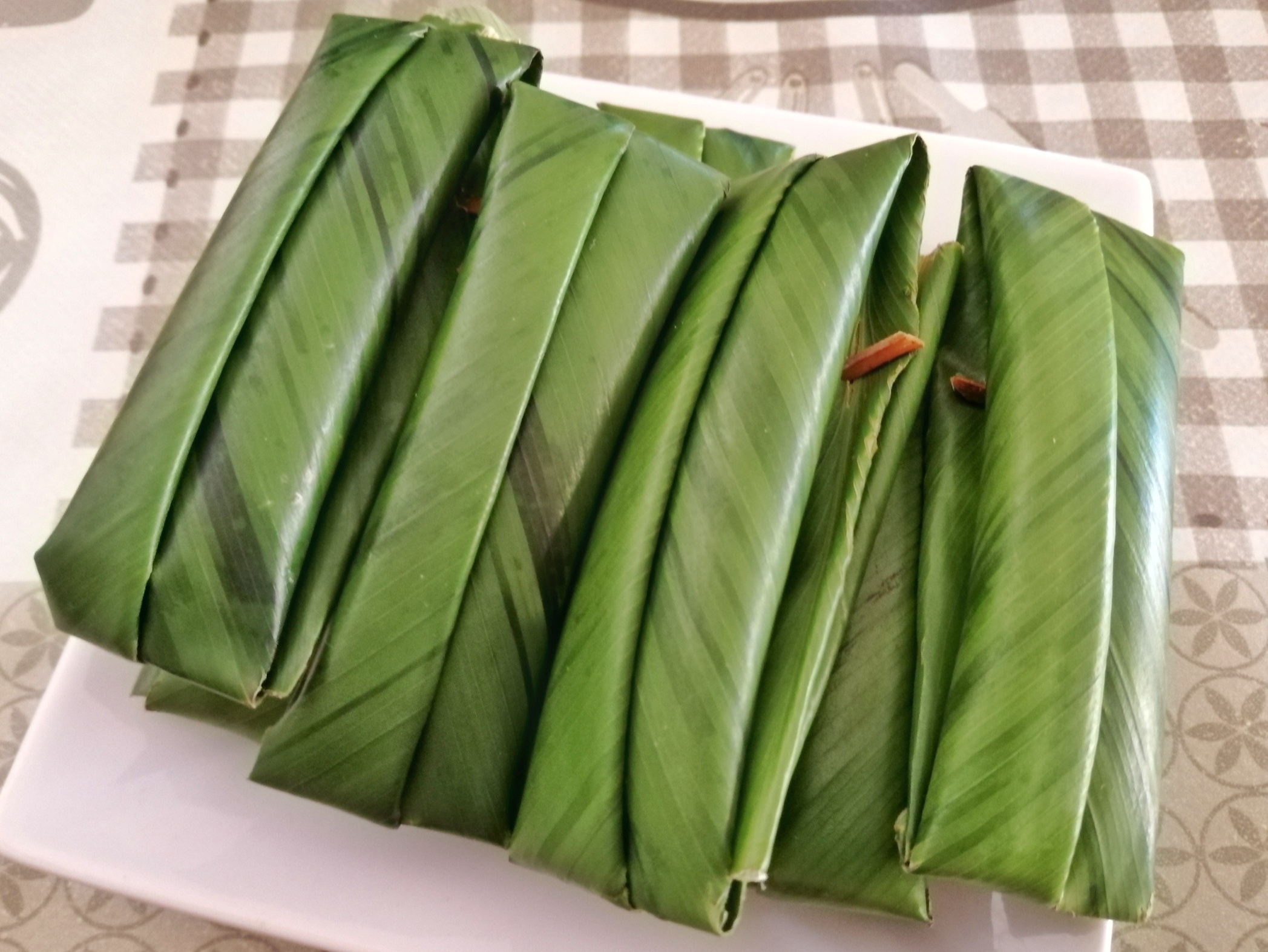
Bruneian wajid

In Brunei, this confection is known as wajid. It is prepared by steaming rice, which is then mixed with coconut milk and caramelized sugar. It is finally wrapped in nyirik leaves and fastened with a pin made with the midrib of oil palm leaves, in the same manner as wrapping kelupis. It is regarded as a traditional food which has been passed down from generation to generation.

The 'ordinary' variety of local wajid is made with glutinous rice (beras pulut). The most popular variety is wajid Jawa, which is made with beras Jawa, the local name for a type of fine-grained rice processed using a machine that is said to be not available in the country. There are also initiatives by some local makers to innovate the flavour by using additional ingredients such as durian, pumpkin, yam, cassava, and chempedak.

Wajid, especially wajid Jawa, is regarded as a specialty of the Temburong District, and it is thus also known as wajid Temburong.

=== Indonesia ===
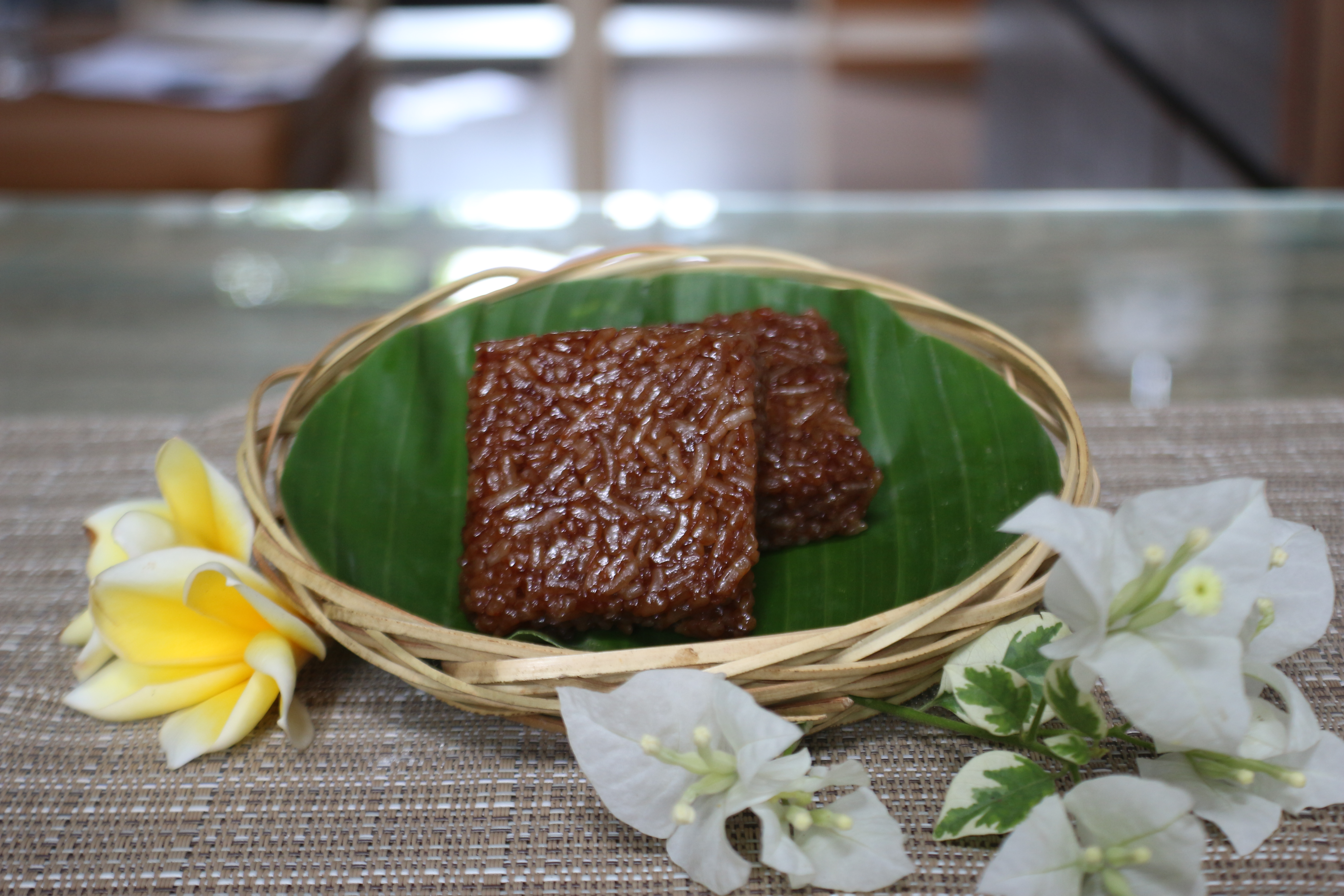
Square shaped Balinese wajik.

Wajik can be found in many regional Indonesian cuisines (i.e. the Javanese, Balinese, Sundanese and Sumatran Malay cuisines). In most parts of Indonesia, especially Java, it is known as wajik, while in Sumatra, it is known as pulut manis (lit. 'sweet sticky rice'). It is made with steamed glutinous rice and further cooked in palm sugar, coconut milk, and pandan leaves. The cooked rice is then spread on a surface and flattened. Once cooled, it is cut into small pieces in the shape of a diamond or rhombus.

In Indonesian language, the term wajik is used to describe the shape of rhombuses or a diamond-shape. Consequently, in a card game, the carreaux (tiles or diamonds♦) is translated as wajik.

Wajik has a cultural significance within the Javanese culture, as it often forms an essential part of the Javanese selamatan ceremony. During the annual Sekaten festival, there is a Tumplak wajik ceremony. In Pekalongan Regency, there is a regional wajik specialty called Wajik Klethik.

== See also ==
- Getuk
- Dodol
