= Pitu village =

Traditional village in Yogyakarta, Indonesia

Pitu village Kampung Pitu
- Village
- Interactive map of Pitu village
- Coordinates: 7°50′28″S 110°33′12″E
- Country: Indonesia
- Province: Yogyakarta
- Regency: Gunungkidul Regency
- District: Patuk

Pitu village (Indonesian: kampung Pitu; pronounced [ˌkampʊŋ ˈpit̪u]) is a village located in Nglanggeran, Patuk District, Gunung Kidul Regency, Special Region of Yogyakarta. It is situated at the eastern peak of Mount Nglanggeran. Pitu village is known for its unique community tradition of limiting the number of households to only seven.

The village originally was called Tlogo village, a name derived from a pond called Tlogo Guyangan, which means the bathing place of the "sembrani" horse or magical horse believed to be the steed of celestial beings. However, in 2015, the village's name was changed by the Tourism Awareness Group (Pokdarwis) to Pitu village as an effort to promote it as one of Gunungkidul Regency’s leading tourist destinations. With this new name, Pitu village received an award from the Governor of the Special Region of Yogyakarta in the category of Cultural Preservation. In 2019, Pitu village was also designated as an Intangible Cultural Heritage of Indonesia under the category of Culture-Based Community Organization.

== History ==
Pitu village is a village that may only be inhabited by seven heads of families. This rule must not be broken by all the residents, as it is believed that violating it will bring disaster. The history of Pitu village began when a sacred heirloom was found embedded in a Kinah Gadung Wulung tree at the peak of Mount Nglenggeran. It was discovered through a competition by Eyang Iro Dikromo, a royal servant of the Ngayogyakarta Hadiningrat Palace. As a reward, he was granted land sufficient for his children and descendants by the royal palace. Eyang Iro Dikromo then invited his companions to settle near the Kinah Gadung Wulung tree and established the following rules:

1. Only seven heads of families are allowed to live around the Kinah Gadung Wulung tree area.
2. If a descendant of one of the seven families wishes to live there, they must wait until a current head of a family passes away.
3. If they still want to stay but the number of heads of families is already seven, they must become part of one of the existing seven families.

These rules are considered a sacred ancestral mandate (pepundhen) passed down to the descendants of Pitu village residents, ensuring that the area is only inhabited by Empu Pitu or seven families. To this day, these rules are still upheld and respected by the community.

According to a local resident named Sugito, the village’s origin traces back to a royal servant of the Yogyakarta Palace who discovered a rare tree called Kinah Gadung Wulung at the mountain’s peak. Inside the tree, there was a powerful sacred kris (dagger). The servant declared that anyone who could care for the heirloom and cleanse the surrounding area would be granted land for their descendants. Eyang Iro Kromo was the only one who succeeded in doing so, and the kris was later kept by the Yogyakarta Palace.

After the event, many empu or spiritually powerful people tried to settle in the area. However, only seven of them managed to survive—others died. This was seen as a sign that only seven families were meant to inhabit Pitu village. This belief has been preserved until now, with the village still being home to only seven heads of families. Some villagers believe that a mystical force maintains this balance and whenever another family tries to settle there, misfortunes such as illness or death occur.

Despite having a relatively large area of land, no newcomers dare to live in Pitu village because of its sacredness. Spanning 7 hectares, the area is strictly inhabited by seven families, totaling around 30 residents and eight houses. These traditions and beliefs have been passed down through generations since the time of Eyang Iro Kromo, who is believed to have founded Pitu village thousands of years ago.

== Tradition ==
The people of Pitu village refrain from holding wayang (traditional shadow puppet) performances. It is because one of the mountains surrounding the village is named Mount Wayang. As a result, the villagers believe that organizing wayang performances is taboo. All residents of Pitu village follow Islam with a syncretic blend of Javanese culture. They regularly hold slametan (communal ritual meals) for various religious ceremonies related to the stages of human life, such as marriage, birth, and death.

Although the community upholds the tradition of having only seven heads of households, there are no restrictions on choosing a marriage partner. People from Pitu village are free to marry anyone, whether from within or outside the village. However, those who marry are not allowed to remain in Pitu village and must leave the village. If they choose to stay, they are not permitted to establish a separate family card and must remain listed under their parents' family card.

== See also ==
- Javanese culture
- Kraton Ngayogyakarta Hadiningrat
- Gunung Kidul Regency
