= Tingkeban =

Javanese prenatal ceremony

Tingkeban is a Javanese prenatal ceremony held during the seventh month of a woman's pregnancy, also known as mitoni. The ritual is also known as slametan mitoni, another name for the slametan rudjakan, which is held when rice in the field is almost ripe and can soon be harvested. Tingkeban is conducted by village midwives and is performed on the seventh, 17th, or 27th day of the seventh Islamic month of the pregnancy, at 7 am. In some locations, the tingkeban is only done for the birth of the first child in the family, whereas others hold a shortened version of the ritual that does not involve ritual bathing or distributing rujak.

The mother-to-be is wrapped in seven sarongs, usually made of batik, and doused with water, to wish her good tidings. Food served in the occasion are:

- Fruit rujak: a special fruit rujak is made for this occasion, and later served to the mother-to-be and her guests, primarily her female friends. It is widely known that the sweet, spicy and sour tastes of fruit rujak are adored by pregnant women. It consists of slices of assorted fruits, such as jambu air (water apple), pineapple, raw mangos, bengkoang (jicama), cucumber, kedondong, raw red ubi jalar (sweet potato) and jeruk bali (pomelo). The sweet and spicy-hot bumbu rujak dressing is made of water, gula jawa (palm sugar), asem jawa (tamarind), ground sauteed peanuts, terasi (shrimp paste), salt, bird's eye chili, and red chili pepper. The recipe of rujak for this ceremony is similar to typical Indonesian fruit rujak, with the exceptions that the fruits are roughly shredded instead of thinly sliced, and the jeruk bali is an essential ingredient. It is believed that if the rujak overall tastes sweet, the unborn would be a girl, and if it is spicy, the unborn baby would be a boy.
- Tumpeng: the tumpeng is made of white rice, encircled by six smaller tumpengs. The dish is served in tampah, which is made of bamboo wood and banana leaf.

Family members and friends usually gather for the occasion.
