= Singsot =

2016 Javanese horror short film

- Directed by: Wahyu Agung Prasetyo
- Written by: Wahyu Titis Dwirani
- Produced by: Elena Rosmeisara
- Starring: Naufal Rafa Adyaksa; Indarwati; Anton Suprapto; Budi Arifianto
- Cinematography: Egha Harismina
- Music by: Pandu Maulana
- Production company: Ravacana Films
- Release date: September 10, 2016 (YouTube)
- Running time: 14 minutes
- Country: Indonesia
- Language: Javanese

"Singsot" is a 2016 Indonesian Javanese-language horror short film directed by Wahyu Agung Prasetyo, written by Wahyu Titis Dwirani, and produced by Ravacana Films. The film stars Naufal Rafa Adyaksa as a boy who dismisses his grandmother's advice as mere superstitions and faces the consequences.

The film was shot in Jogjakarta and was later adapted as the 2025 feature film Singsot: Siulan Kematian.

== Plot and Summary ==
A boy, Pulung, is staying at is grandparents' house. His grandfather and him whistle at the new bird they got during the evening. Pulung's grandmother tells him that he must not whistle at night, as it is believed to attract evil spirits. She talks about a neighbourhood boy who whistled at night and was haunted. Pulung ignores the advice and continues whistling whilst playing with his grandfathers bird. His grandmother berates his grandfather on teaching the boy how to whistle, and ignoring her advice, how the two are similar.

That night, his grandparents go to a neighbour's slametan. Pulung chooses to stay at home. However, Pulung has nightmares of meeting an evil spirit, leaving him very frightened. He ends up leaving the house with his grandparents, with a thief breaking into the house soon after.

== Cast ==
- Naufal Rafa Adyaksa as Pulung
- Anton Suprapto as Grandfather
- Indarwati as Grandmother
- Budi Arifianto as thief

== Reception ==
On 2020, the short went viral after a tweet about the film earned more than 5000 likes. Viewers praised the short, which has been watched more than 800.000 times.

== Awards ==
- 2016 Fiagra Film Festival Best Horror Film
- 2016 Jogja-NETPAC Asian Film Festival Official Selection
- 2017 Taman Film Festival Best Horror Film
- 2017 Taman Film Festival Jury Prize
