= Javanese culture =

Culture of the Javanese people

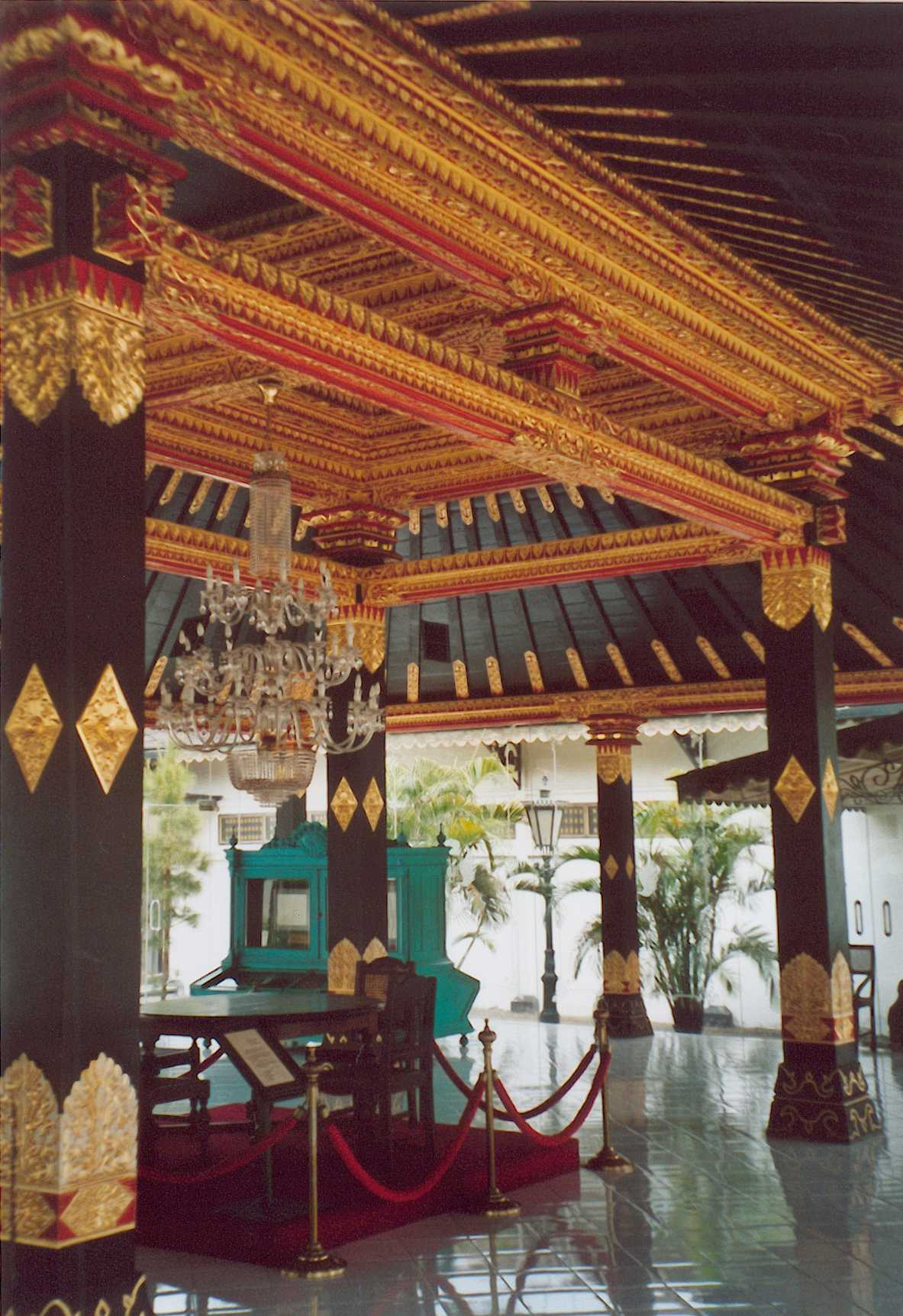
The Yogyakarta sultanate palace's main pavilion

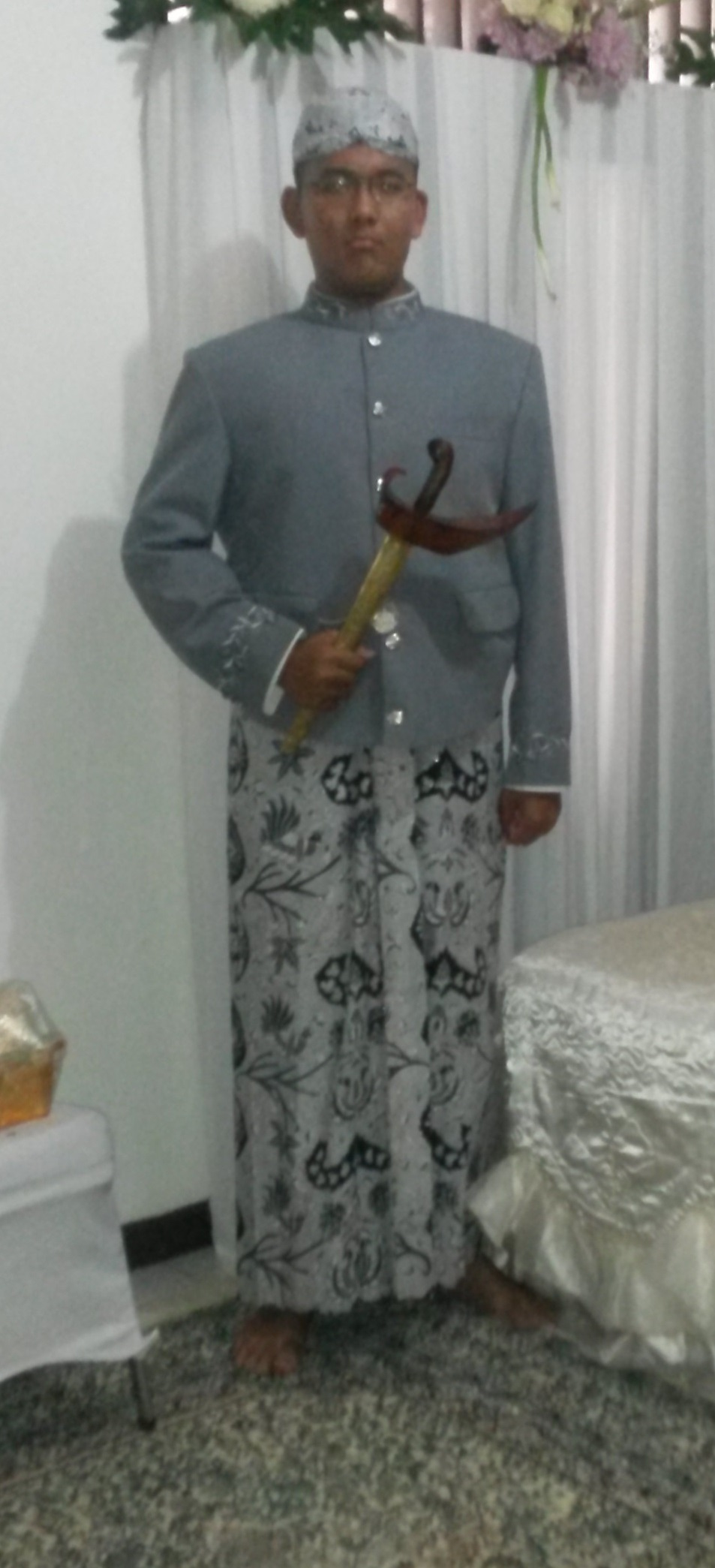
Front view

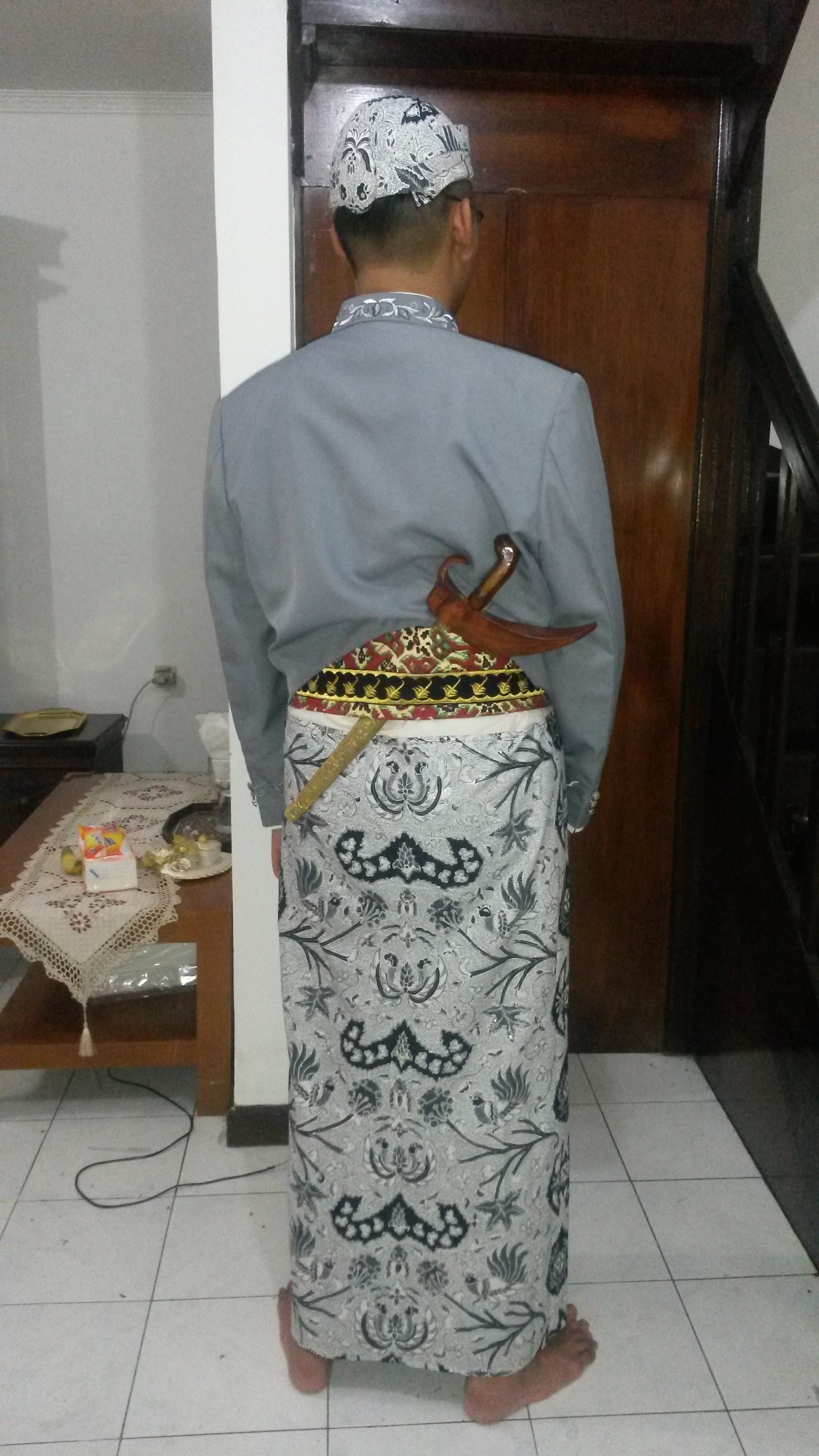
Rear view

The Javanese traditional attire for men worn with a Blangkon and accompanied with a Kris is one of the main customs of Javanese culture especially during wedding ceremonies usually worn by the family of the bride and the bridegroom himself.

Javanese culture (Javanese: ꦏꦧꦸꦢꦪꦤ꧀ꦗꦮ, romanized: Kabudayan Jawa) is the culture of the Javanese people. Javanese culture is centered in the provinces of Central Java, Yogyakarta and East Java in Indonesia. Due to various migrations, it can also be found in other parts of the world, such as Suriname (where 15% of the population are of Javanese descent), the broader Malay archipelago region, Cape Malay, Malaysia, Singapore, Netherlands and other countries. The migrants bring with them various aspects of Javanese cultures such as Gamelan music, traditional dances and art of Wayang kulit shadow play.

The migration of Javanese people westward has created the Javanese culture in a small part of the northern coast that is distinct from the Sundanese culture in the majority of West Java and Banten. Being the largest ethnic group, the Javanese culture and people influence Indonesian politics and culture, a process sometimes described as Javanisation.

== Literature ==
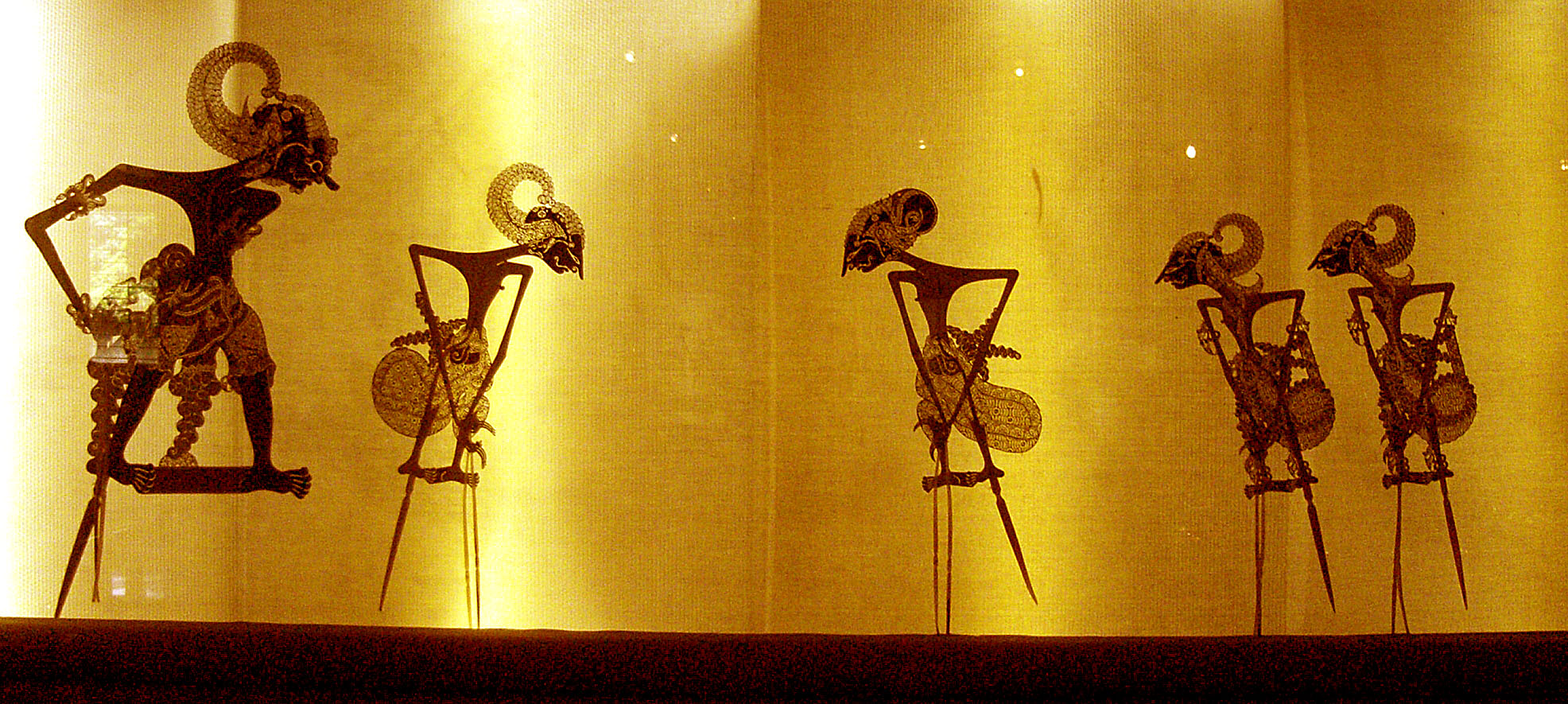
The five Pandawa brothers from the Hindu epic Mahabharata, narrated in the Javanese Wayang kulit.

Javanese literature tradition is among the earliest and the oldest surviving literature traditions in Indonesia. The translations of Hindu epic Ramayana and Mahabharata into old Javanese language took place during the era of Mataram kingdom and Kediri kingdom around 9th to 11th century. The Smaradahana is also composed during Kediri kingdom, and it became the prelude of later Panji cycles that spread as far as Siam and Cambodia. Other literary works include Ken Arok and Ken Dedes, based upon Pararaton, the story of the orphan who usurped his king, and married the queen of the ancient Javanese kingdom.

During the reign of Majapahit several notable works was produced. Nagarakretagama describes Majapahit during its height. Tantu Pagelaran explained the mythical origin of the island and its volcanic nature. Kakawin Sutasoma, written by Mpu Tantular during the reign of the Majapahit. It is the source of the motto of Indonesia, Bhinneka Tunggal Ika, which is usually translated as Unity in Diversity, although literally it means '(Although) in pieces, yet One'. The kakawin teaches religious tolerance, specifically between the Hindu and Buddhist religions.

Other works includes Babad Tanah Jawi is a literature which relates to the spread of Islam in Java and Babad Dipanagara which tells the story of Prince Diponegoro.

== Spirituality ==
=== Spirtuality background: Majapahit empire ===
Historically, Javanese follow a syncretic form of Hinduism, Buddhism and Kebatinan. The Majapahit empire religious tolerance in their society can be summed as Bhinnêka tunggal ika tan hana dharma mangrwa ('They are indeed different, but they are of the same kind, as there is no duality in Truth').

Starting from the 15th century, Islam and Christianity came to Java and slowly spread. Due to internal and external conflicts, Majapahit collapsed in the 16th century. Islam spread quickly under the new Islamic monarchs. While the spread of Christianity was supervised by colonial powers.

All the new religions were not taken literally but instead interpreted by the Javanese according to the Javanese traditional values, creating a new set of religious beliefs unique to local culture.

Javanese in ethnic understanding holds concept of madu basa (good language and respectfulness), madu rasa (good feeling consideration), and madu brata (good restraint and contemplation). The ideals of human reflected on aphorisms such as hanggayuh kasampurnaning urip (building the perfect life), berbudi bawa leksana (being wise and full of willingness to sacrifice), and ngudi sejatining becik (striving to be truly good).

=== Islam ===
Islam first came in contact with Java during Majapahit periods, when they traded or made tributary relations with various states like Perlak and Samudra Pasai in modern-day Aceh. Sufism played a major role in affecting the Islamic understanding of Javanese in the fourteenth century and affected the local understanding of afterlife and spirits, such as jinn, demons and ghosts.

The introduction of Islam to the island by the new Muslim monarchs was not always peaceful however, Javanese nobles and peasants who rejected the new rulers were either conquered or fled to neighboring Bali where they contributed heavily to the Balinese Hindu religion and culture. Some Hindus who remained in Java retreated themself to more remote area such as Tenger near the Mount Bromo to avoid proselytization. During the Islamization of Java, Sunan Kalijaga was one of the Walisanga which was active in promoting a more moderate form of Islam in Java, he was later appointed as advisor in the new Mataram Sultanate. Most Javanese follow the Shafi‘ite tradition of Sunnism (97%).

The introduction of Islam to Java uses the mysticism approach. This resulted in dialectics between Javanese mysticism and Islamic mysticism which is the characteristics of Javanese Islam. In Javanese Islam, traditions and culture placed as neutral container which inherited as previous relics, while the content is Islam.

=== Christianity ===
A minority of Javanese also follow Christianity of the branch Protestantism and Catholicism (2,5%), which are rather concentrated in Central Java particularly Semarang, Surakarta, Salatiga, and Magelang, also in Yogyakarta for Catholicism.

=== Hindu-Buddhist ===
Another minority are Hindus and Buddhists, they are mostly found in East Java (also some in parts of Central Java and Yogyakarta). The Javanese Tengger tribe is still practicing Javanese-Hindu until today. There are also many new recent converts of Javanese to Hinduism and Buddhism.

=== Kebatinan ===
Kebatinan are principles embodying a search for the inner self but at the core is the concept of the peace of mind, connection with the universe, and with an Almighty God. Although Kebatinan is not strictly a religious affiliation, it addresses ethical and spiritual values as inspired by Javanese tradition. It is not a religion in usual sense of the word, like Islam, Judaism, or Christianity. There are no scriptures such as the Bible or the Qur'an, nor are there prophets. During the Soeharto era, this minority is acknowledged and protected as penganut kepercayaan.

== Ceremonies ==
Many traditional Javanese customs or festivals such as meditation, slametan, naloni mitoni, patangpuluhdinanan, nyatus and nyewu have their roots in the Kebatinan belief. Javanese of other beliefs modify them accordingly, incorporating Muslims, Christian or Hindu prayers instead. Details of the ceremonies differ from one community to the other.

=== Grebeg Maulud ===
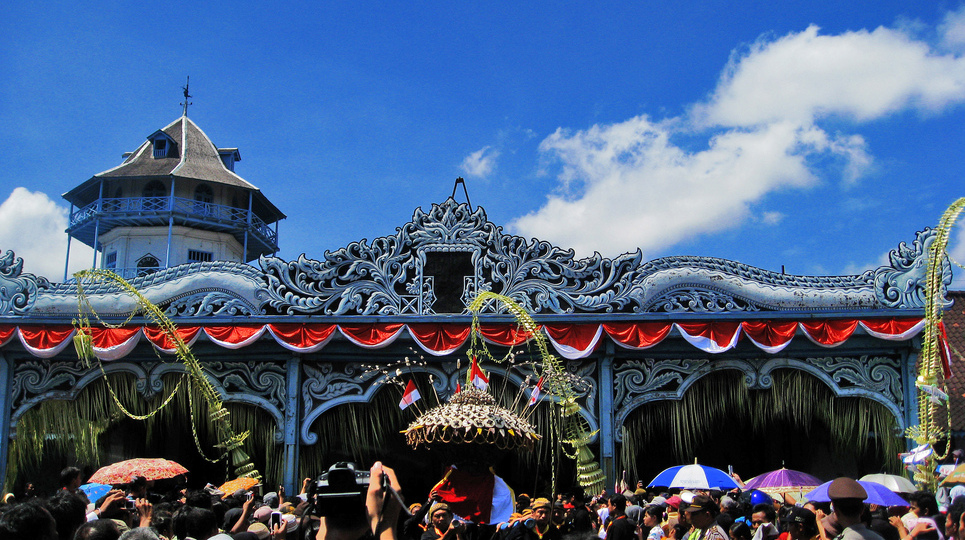
Grebeg Maulud at Surakarta

Grebeg Maulud is a traditional ceremony held by the royal court of Keraton Surakarta and Jogjakarta, to commemorate the birth of Islam's holy messenger, Muhammad. This ceremony was first held during the reign of the Demak Dynasty dating back to the 15th century. The ceremony starts with prayers in the grand mosques, a parade and a carnival of the people.

=== Javanese wedding ===
There are several variations of Javanese wedding, depending on the custom and social standing of the couple. Popular variation includes Surakartan, Jogjakarta, Paes Kesatrian, and Paes Ageng. The wedding rituals will include Siraman, Midodareni, Peningsetan, Ijab (for Muslims) or wedding sacrament (for Christians).

==== Siraman ====
The bride and groom to be are showered at their respective homes, by families and close friends. Prayers are also given hoping for a good tide.

=== Naloni Mitoni ===
Held for the first pregnancy of a woman, when the pregnancy is in its seventh month. Family and close friends are invited. The mother-to-be is shrouded with seven layers of batik, symbolizing hope for a good child and delivery. Prayers and traditional food are also served.

=== Selapanan ===
Held when a child is 35 days, a ritual celebrating the new life. Family members and close friends will come to the event. The child's hair and nails are shaved. prayers, religious readings and a slametan is a common part of the event. After the event, cakes, sweets and eggs (symbolising the new life) will be shared.

=== Tedhak Sithen ===
Held when a child is around eight months old. Family members are invited, to celebrate a child starting to walk.

=== Khitan ===
For a boy, khitan, or circumcision, is an important transition toward adulthood. The ritual usually held when the boy is 6 to 12 years old. Following the circumcision it is customary to sacrifice a goat, hold a slametan and wayang kulit (shadow puppet) performance. Circumcision is one factor that differentiate the Javanese with related Balinese and Tenggerese, which still predominantly Hindu.

=== Ruwatan Gembel ===
The day Hindu children of the Dieng community shave their hair. A large offering ceremony to the Gods at the temples are given. Afterwards the community arranges a festival. Tourists normally flock to see the event.

=== Slametan ===
Prayers to hope for good tidings. Normally tumpeng is served.

=== Patangpuluhdinanan, Nyatus, Nyewu ===
Prayers given on the 40th, 100th, and 1000th days since a person deceased.

=== Nyekar ===
Before the month of Ramadhan, family members visit the graves of their loved ones, pray for their well-being.

=== Labuan ===
A kejawen ceremony, where kebatinan believers throws a shroud to the sea or mountain, to throw away bad luck.

== Social structure ==
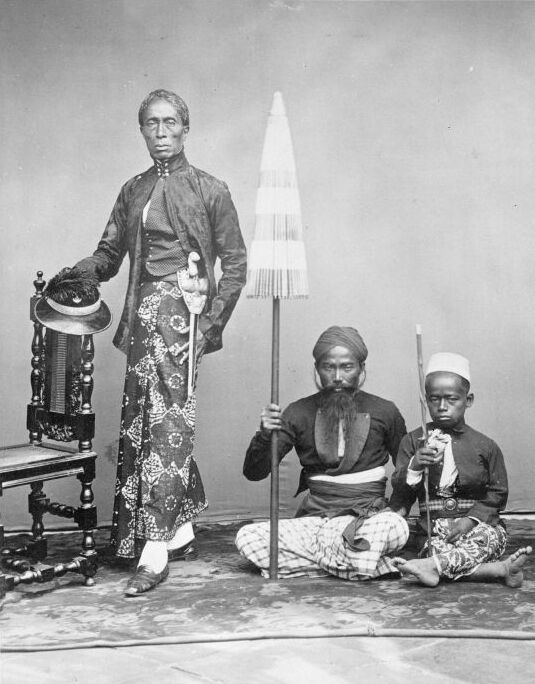
Javanese priyayi and servants, c. 1865.

The American anthropologist Clifford Geertz in the 1960s divided the Javanese community into three aliran or "streams": santri, abangan and priyayi. According to him, the Santri followed an orthodox interpretation of Islam, the abangan followed a syncretic form of Islam that mixed Hindu and animist elements (often termed Kejawen), and the priyayi was the nobility.

But today the Geertz opinion is often opposed because he mixed the social groups with belief groups. It was also difficult to apply this social categorisation in classing outsiders, for example other non-indigenous Indonesians such as persons of Arab, Chinese and Indian descent.

Social stratification is much less rigid in northern coast area, which is much more egalitarian.

=== Sultans ===
The Keratons, the royal palaces of the Yogyakarta Sultanate and the Surakarta Sunanate, are the central of the Javanese culture and social events. Although they are not ruling monarchs, they are still highly revered and look upon in the society. When addressing to the Sultan, a person is expected to speak in the refined "kromo inggil"; today, formal bahasa Indonesia is also accepted.

Not all Javanese were once subjects of the Yogyakarta Sultanate and the Surakarta Sunanate.

=== Priyayi ===
The Priyayis were once part of the ruling aristocrats, they have little function today. Some of Indonesia's ruling political figures are descendants of the priyayis. They are now part of the general society and work in numerous fields.

=== Villages ===
Villages are an important administrative unit in Java. It is divided into two types: Desa with elective leadership, usually in rural areas, and Kelurahan, where the leadership is appointed by Indonesian government, usually in urban areas. Village administration is managed by officers, still called with their traditional Javanese names. These are lurah (village chief), assisted by offices of carik (village secretary), kamituwa (officer for social affairs), jagabaya (officer for security), and modin (office for Islamic affairs and rituals, derived from Arabic Imam ad-Din, or leader of the faith).

These officers traditionally didn't get paid in cash, but allotted a portion in the village's public land to be farmed, called tanah bengkok. In modern-day Indonesia, Village chief is elected directly by universal suffrage of the villagers, who are 17 years old and above, or already married. As literacy rate was low before independence, it is customary for the rival candidates to use common items as their campaign symbol, such as fruits, vegetables or traditional foods. The village chief election is usually non-partisan.

=== Family ===
Culturally, Javanese people adopt a bilateral kinship system, with male and female descendants having equal importance. As such there is no preference on having a male heir like paternalistic cultures in India or China. It is not customary for Javanese to have a surname. Women have a high degree of autonomy and are respected in Javanese culture.

In a traditional marriage, it is the groom's family who chooses the bride from a selection of prospects. Prior to the wedding, the groom's family will give the bride's family a sum of dower. Afterwards, the bride's family is responsible for paying for the wedding. The groom's family can help financially, but they are not obliged to do so. Traditionally, divorce is not acceptable, but it was acceptable for the husband to take a second wife or a mistress. Young Javanese normally do not follow these customs, and today most Javanese women will resist infidelity and opt for a divorce. Divorce is becoming acceptable in Java.

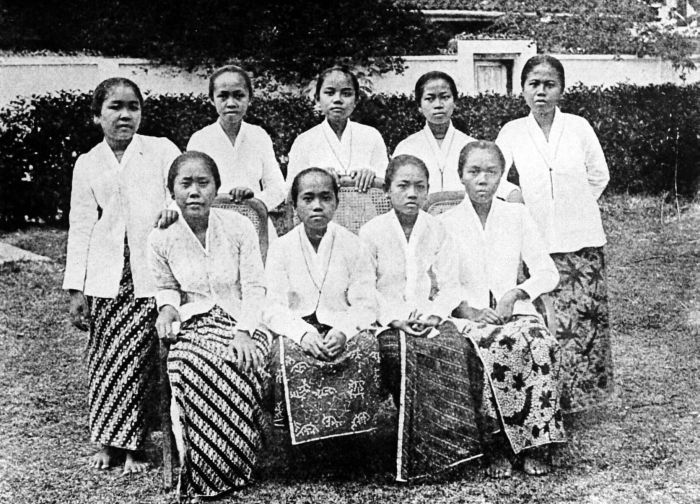
Javanese ladies in Semarang, Dutch East Indies wearing kebaya.

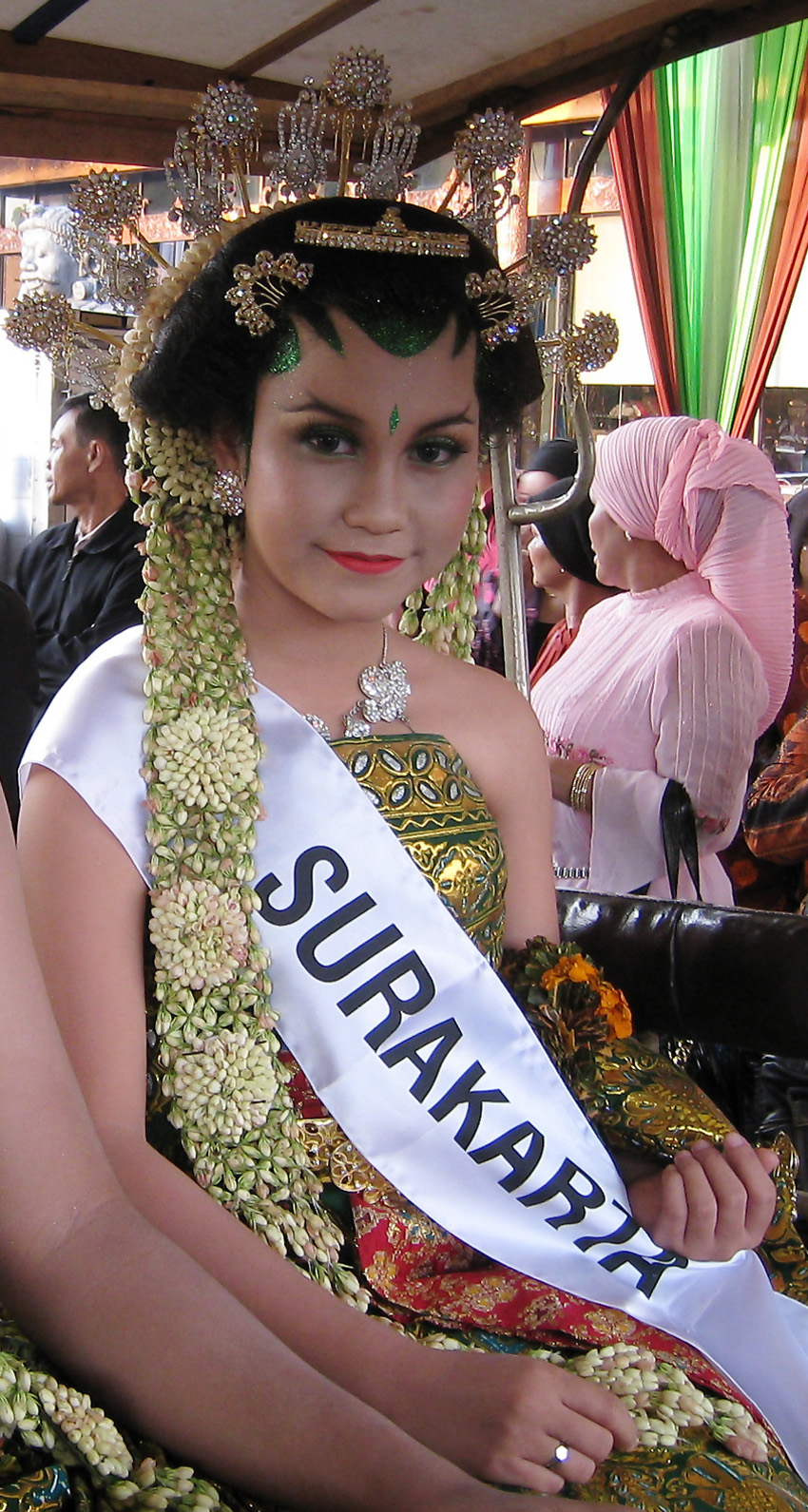
Javanese Surakarta bride in dhodot or Solo basahan royal wedding costume.

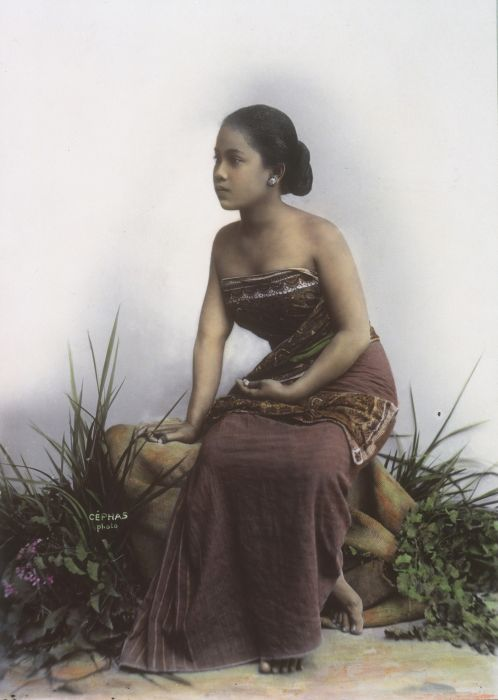
Picture of Javanese lady in traditional dress

== Language ==
Javanese script

Javanese is a member of the Austronesian family of languages and is closely related to, but distinct from, other languages of Indonesia. It is notable for its great number of nearly ubiquitous Sanskrit loans, found especially in literary Javanese. This is due to the long history of Hindu and Buddhist influences in Java.

Most Javanese in Indonesia are bilingual, being fluent in Indonesian and Javanese. In a public poll held c. 1990, approximately 12% of Javanese used Indonesian, around 18% used both Javanese and Indonesian, and the rest used Javanese exclusively.

The Javanese language was commonly written with a script descended from the Brahmi script, natively known as Hanacaraka or Carakan. Upon Indonesian independence it was replaced with a form of the Latin alphabet.

While Javanese was not made an official language of Indonesia, it has the status of 'regional language' for communication in the Javanese-majority regions. The language also can be viewed as an 'ethnic language' because it is one of the defining characteristics of the Javanese ethnic identity.

== Occupations ==
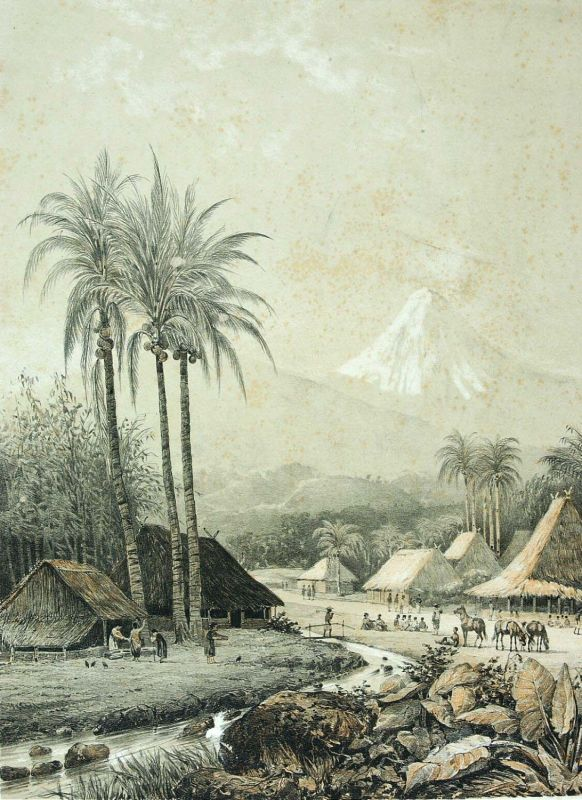
Village in the slope of Mount Semeru, East Java. Colonial period painting.

In Indonesia, Javanese can be found in all occupations, especially in the government and the military.

=== Farming ===
Traditionally, most Javanese are farmers. This was especially common because of the fertile volcanic soil in Java. The most important agricultural commodity is rice. In 1997, it was estimated that Java produced 55% of Indonesian output of the crop. Most farmers work small-scale rice field, with around 42% of farmers cultivate less than 0.5 hectare of rice field. In region where soil is less fertile of where rainy season is short, other staple crops is cultivated, such as cassava.

=== Blacksmithing ===
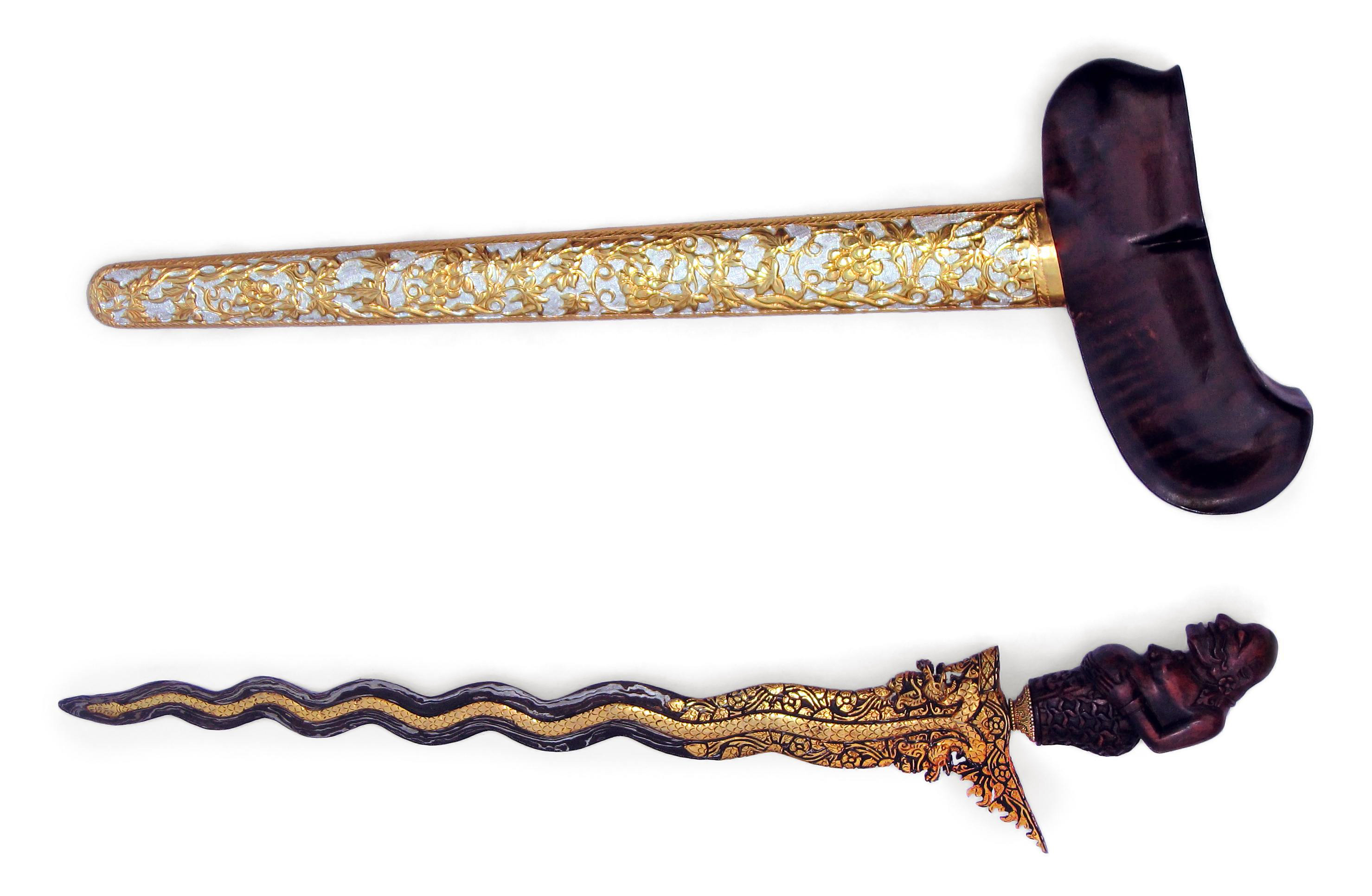
A decorative kris with a figure of Semar as the handle. The bilah has thirteen luk.

For the Javanese, blacksmiths are traditionally valued. Some blacksmiths fast, and meditate to reach perfection. Javanese blacksmiths provide a range of tools such as farming equipment and to cultural items such as gamelan instruments and kris. Majapahit rigidly use fire-arms and cannonade as a feature of warfare. The Javanese bronze breech-loaded swivel-gun, more correctly known as a meriam was used ubiquitously by the Majapahit navy and unfortunately pirates and rival lords. The demise of the Majapahit empire also cause the flight of disaffected skilled bronze cannon-smiths to Brunei, modern Sumatra and Malaysia, and the Philippines lead to near universal use of the swivel-gun, especially on trade vessels to protect against prevalent marauding pirates, in the Makassar Strait.

Keris is an important item, with many heirloom kris made by master blacksmiths holding significant historical value. The design of the keris, with its snake like blade, is to tear apart an opponent's abdomen, making the injury more severe. While the Javanese canting, enables them to make intricate Batik.

Kota Gede is famous for its silverworks and silver handicrafts.

=== Batik ===
Batik textiles are a traditional pastime for women, although some villages specialize in batik, such as Pekalongan, Kauman, Kampung Taman, and Laweyan.

=== Wood carving ===
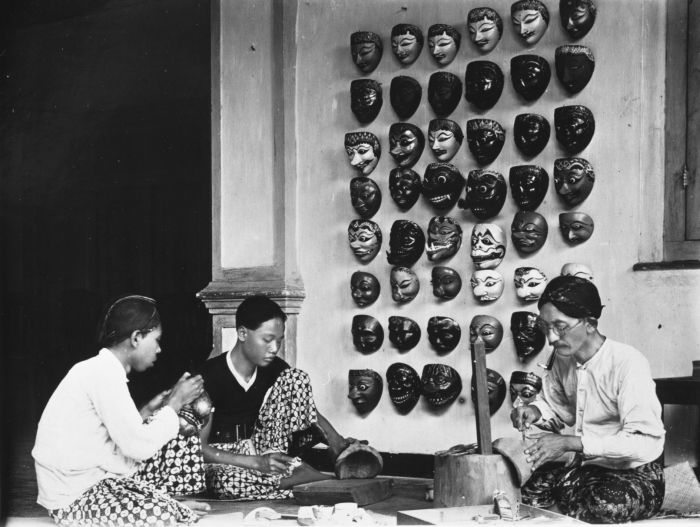
Javanese woodworkers making traditional masks during the Dutch East Indies era.

The Javanese art of wood carving is traditionally applied to various cultural attributes such as statues, (wayang-)dolls, and masks.

== Calendar ==
See Javanese calendar

The Javanese calendar is used by Javanese people concurrently with two other calendars, the Gregorian calendar and the Islamic calendar. Gregorian calendar is the official calendar of Indonesia while the Islamic calendar is used by Muslims and Indonesian government for religious worship and deciding relevant Islamic holidays. Javanese calendar presently used mostly for cultural events (such as Satu Sura). As a lunar calendar, its epoch year was in AD 125, the present Javanese calendar system was adopted by Sultan Agung in 1633, based on the Islamic calendar. Previously, Javanese people used a solar system based on the Hindu calendar.

Unlike many other calendars, the Javanese calendar uses a 5-day week known as the Pasaran cycle. This is still in use today and superimposed with 7-day week of the Gregorian calendar and Islamic calendar to become what is known as the 35-day Wetonan cycle.

== Art ==
Javanese origin artforms are among the best known in Indonesia and the whole archipelago. The famous Javanese wayang puppetry culture was influenced by Hindu and Buddhist traditions. The Wayang repertoire stories, lakon, are mostly based on epics from India; Ramayana and Mahabharata. These epics and stories influenced wayang puppetry as well as Javanese classical dances. The influences from Islam and the Western world also can be found. The art of batik, and kris dagger are of Javanese origin.

=== Music ===
Gamelan musical ensembles are found in both Java and Bali. All of these artforms holds important position, and function within Javanese culture and tradition.

== Architecture ==
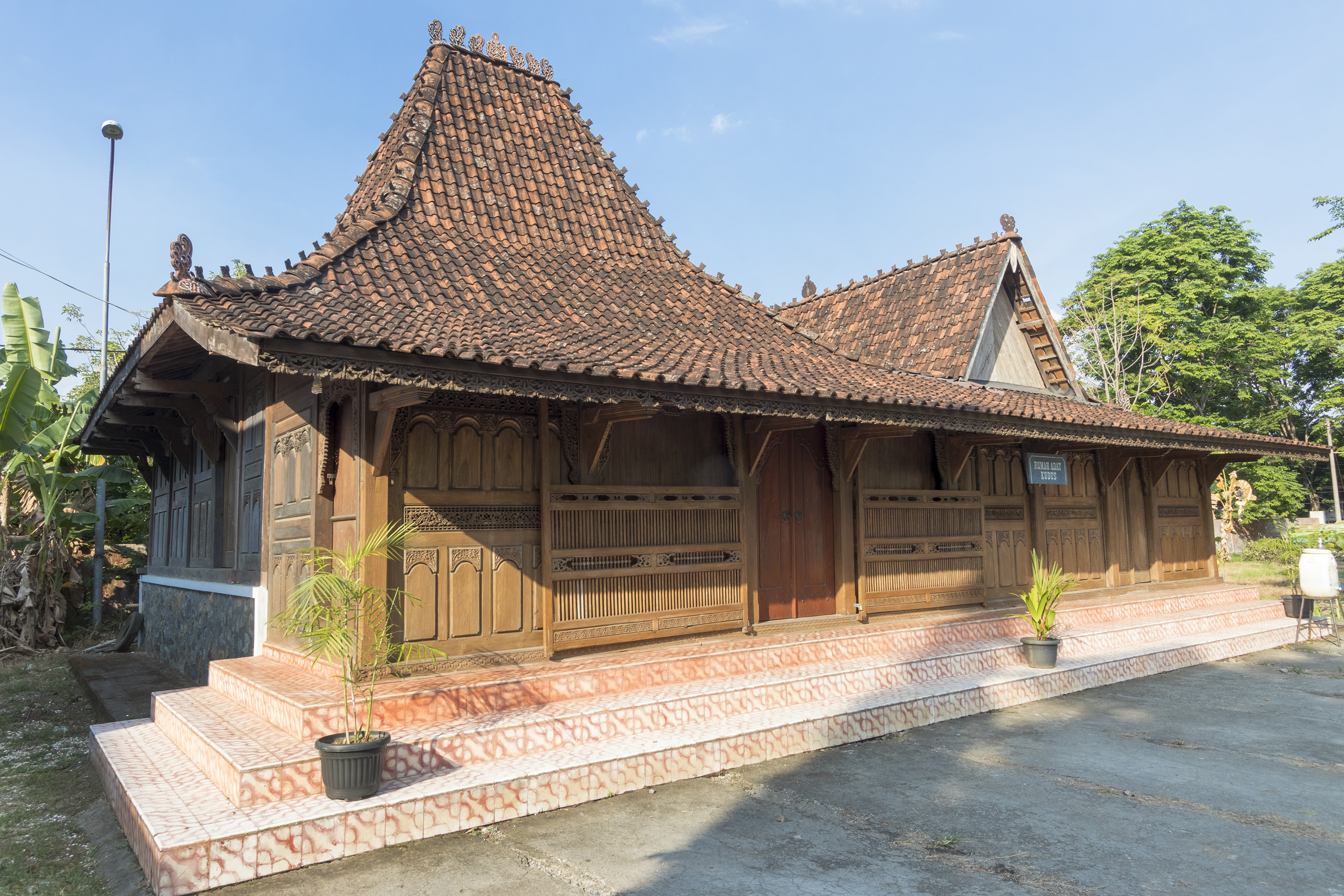
A traditional Javanese house from Kudus

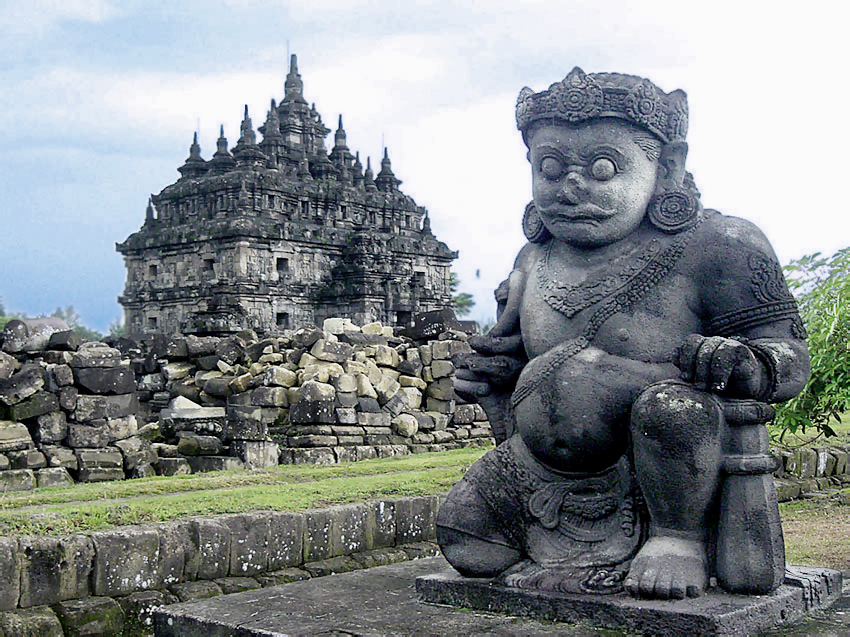
Candi Plaosan in Prambanan (9th century).

Throughout their long history, the Javanese have produced many important buildings, ranging from Hindu monuments, Buddhist stupa, mortuary temples, palace complexes, and mosques.

The paragon of religious monuments are Hindu temple of Prambanan and Buddhist temple of Borobudur. Both of them 9th centuries temples which are UNESCO World Heritage Site. Both are located near city of Yogyakarta in the slope of Mount Merapi.

Meanwhile, example of secular building can be seen in ruins of former capital city of Majapahit Kingdom (14th to 16th century AD) in Trowulan, East Java. The complex covers an area of 11 km x 9 km. It consists of various brick building, ranging from 20 to 40 meter-wide canal, purification pools, temples and iconic split gates. The capital complex is currently being considered as a candidate for becoming a UNESCO World Heritage Site.

Traditional Javanese building can be identified by its trapezoid shaped roof supported by wooden pillars. Another common feature in Javanese building is pendopo, a pavilion with open-side and four large pillars. The pillars and other part of the buildings can be richly carved. This architecture style can be found at kraton or palace of the Sultanates of Yogyakarta (palaces of Hamengkubuwono and Pakualaman) and Surakarta (palaces of Pakubuwono and Mangkunegaran).

Traditional mosques in Java maintain a distinctive Javanese style. The pendopo model is used as main feature of the mosque as its prayer hall. A trapezoidal roof is used instead of the more typically Muslim dome. These roofs are often multi-tiered and tiled. In addition to not using domes, traditional Javanese mosques also often lack minarets. The split gate from earlier Hindu-Buddhist period is still used in many mosques and public buildings in Java.

Some notable examples of mosques using traditional Javanese architecture include Agung Demak Mosque, Menara Kudus Mosque and the Grand Mosque of Banten. The Kudus Mosque is also of note because it incorporates Hindu-style stone architecture.

== Names ==
Javanese do not usually have family names or surnames. Many have just a single name, such as Sukarno or Suharto. Javanese names may come from traditional Javanese languages, many of which are derived from Sanskrit. Names with the prefix Su-, which means good, are very common. After the advent of Islam, many Javanese began using Arabic names, especially in the coastal regions where Islamic influences were stronger. Commoners usually only have one-word names, while nobilities use two-or-more-word names, but rarely a surname. Due to the influence of other cultures, many people started using names from other languages, mainly European languages. Christian Javanese usually use Latin baptism names followed by a traditional Javanese name.

Some people use a patronymic. For example, Abdurrahman Wahid's name is derived from his father's name (Wahid Hasyim) who was an independence fighter and minister. In turn, Wahid Hasyim's name was derived from that of his father: Hasyim Asyari, a famous cleric and founder of the Nahdlatul Ulama organisation.

== Cuisine ==
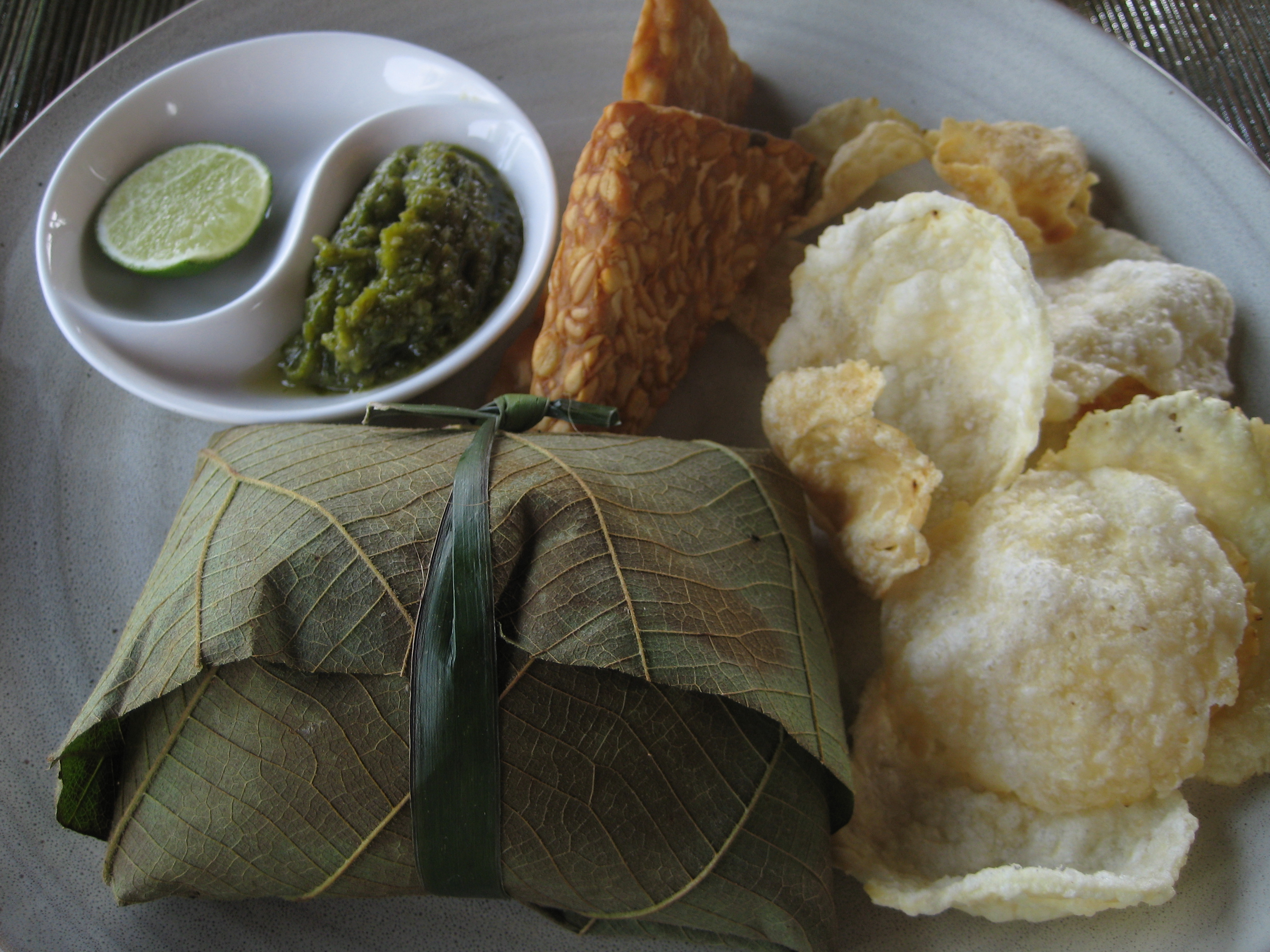
Example of Javanese cuisine. Clockwise: fried tempeh, mlinjo crackers, gudeg with rice wrapped in teak leaf, green chili sambal and sliced lime.

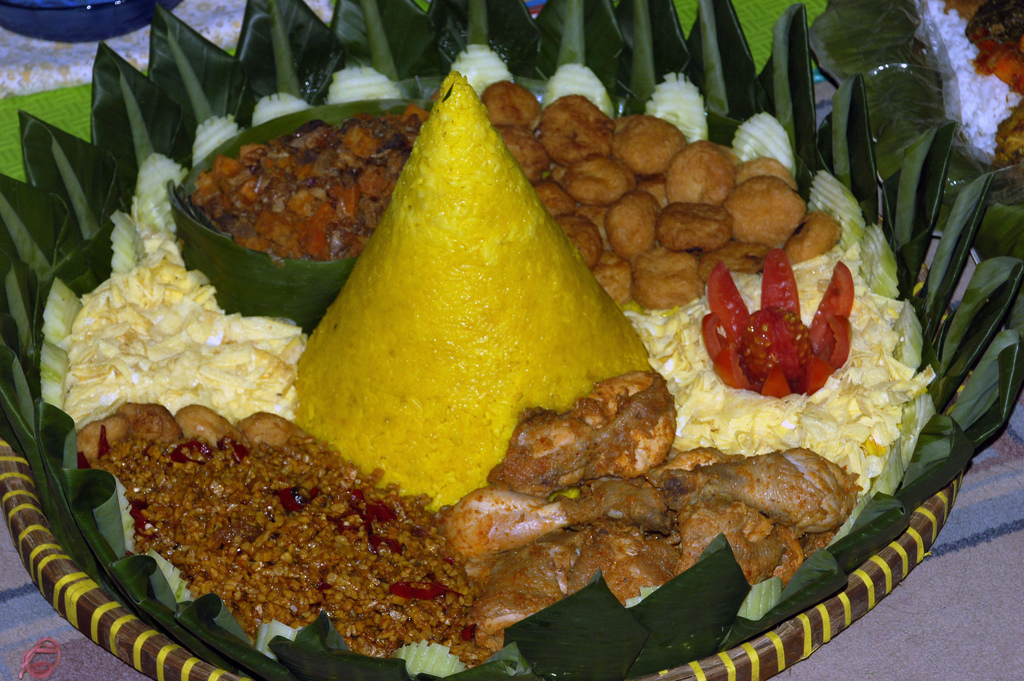
Tumpeng, a quintessential Javanese rice dish that symbolizes a volcano.

Javanese cuisine and culture place an important role in rice, the staple food of the island. Among Javanese it is considered not to have a meal if a person hasn't eaten rice yet. It is also important part of identity that differentiate Javanese with foreigners that eat bread (the Europeans) and resident of other island who eat sago (for example Moluccans). Rice is also symbol of development and prosperity, while cassava and tuber is associated with poverty.

Javanese cuisine is varied by regions. Eastern Javanese cuisine has preference for more salty and hot foods, while the Central Javanese prefer sweeter foods.

Famous food in Javanese cuisine is for example Rujak Cingur, a marinated cow lips and noses, served with vegetable, shrimp prawn and peanut sauce with chili. Rujak Cingur is considered traditional food of Surabaya in East Java.

Gudeg is a traditional food from Yogyakarta and Central Java which is made from young nangka (jack fruit) boiled for several hours with palm sugar, and coconut milk.

Pecel, a type of peanut sauce with chili is a common ingredient in Javanese cuisine. It is used in various type of Rujak and Gado-gado. It can also be used as stand alone sauce with rice and prawn, egg and vegetables as Nasi Pecel (Pecel rice).

Tumpeng, is a rice served in the shape of a conical volcano, usually with rice colored yellow using turmeric. It is an important part of ceremony in Java. Tumpeng served in landmark events such as birthday, moving house, or other ceremonies. Traditionally, Tumpeng is served alongside fried chicken, boiled egg, vegetables, goat meat on a round plate made from bamboo called besek.

A notable food in Java is tempeh, a meat substitute made from soy bean fermented with mold. It is a staple source of protein in Java and popular in the world as an excellent meat substitute for vegetarians.

== See also ==
- Dewi Sri
- Nyai Roro Kidul
- Javanese Kshatriya
- Javanisation
- List of Javanese people
- Javanese in Singapore
- Javanese Surinamese
