= Singsot: Siulan Kematian =

- Directed by: Wahyu Agung Prasetyo
- Written by: Wahyu Agung Prasetyo
- Based on: "Singsot" (2016)
- Produced by: Rajesh Punjabi; Elena Rosmeisara
- Starring: Ardhana Jovin Aska Haryanto; Landung Simatupang; Jamaluddin Latif; Siti Fauziah; Sri Isworowati
- Cinematography: Fahrul Tri Hikmawan
- Edited by: Helmi Nur Rasyid
- Music by: Pandu Maulana; Prima Setiawan
- Production companies: Ravacana Films; Clockwork Films
- Release date: March 13, 2025 (Indonesia)
- Country: Indonesia
- Language: Javanese

Singsot: Siulan Kematian is a 2025 Indonesian Javanese-language supernatural horror film directed and written by Wahyu Agung Prasetyo and produced by Ravacana Films and Clockwork Films, based on the 2016 horror short "Singsot". The film stars Ardhana Jovin Aska Haryanto, Landung Simatupang, Jamaluddin Latif, Siti Fauziah and Sri Isworowati, and is about the Javanese superstition of the prohibition to whistle at night.

The film premiered on Indonesian theatres on 13 March 2025 and on Netflix on 17 July 2025.

== Plot ==
In a small village in the interior of Java, there is a myth about the prohibition of whistling after maghrib. The film begins with a man catching birds by whistling. Not long after, there is the sound of whistling coming from behind the trees and suddenly the man is dragged and sucked into the forest. Ipung is a child who lives with his grandparents in a village in Jogja. They live in a simple house on the edge of the village, surrounded by rice fields and dense forest. One day, Ipung and his two friends, Didit and Kholis, ride their bicycles together to chase after a broken kite. It is almost dark and the kite falls into the middle of the forest. Ipung actually wants to retrieve the kite, but Kholis forbids him and tells him to go home.

There is a myth believed by the local people there, called "singsot," a prohibition against whistling at dusk. It is believed that whistling at dusk can summon the "whistling demon" or an evil spirit thirsty for blood, who will come to take the life of the person who breaks the rule. Ipung, who does not believe in the myth, continued to whistle at night. This prompts his grandmother, Mbah Wedok, to ask her husband, Mbah Lanang, to reprimand Ipung. Mbah Lanang scolds Ipung and then goes out for his night patrol. While passing by Mbah Darmo's house, Mbah Lanang learns from one of the locals there that they had just found Mbah Darmo lying on the floor. It was later discovered that Mbah Darmo had actually passed away. The next day, the man who at the beginning of the story was sucked into the trees is lying weakly in his house. The man's name is Agus Pete. When his wife Wiwik tries to feed him, Agus suddenly widens his eyes in fear.

Ipung begins to see apparitions and often has nightmares. During Mbah Darmo's funeral, the villagers gossip about Pete and Wiwik. At a bird competition, Mbah Lanang talks with Mbah Manto about the incident that happened to Mbah Darmo. Mbah Manto believes that Mbah Darmo's death was caused by the death of Mbah Darmo's bird Petruk, which has always been considered his protector, and that it is also related to Agus Pete's illness. Mbah Lanang is convinced that there must have been some taboo that Pete violated, which caused this. At home, Mbah Wedok's life is in danger when an apparition resembling Ipung tries to strangle her and push her into the well.

Wiwik, who is guided by Pakdhe Tirto, continues performing rituals to save her husband. Mbah Manto, with his supernatural powers, sees that the cause of the casualties among the residents is due to a wealth spirit called Ganda Rumbing. All of this happened because Agus Pete and Wiwik had performed the Kutut Manggung wealth ritual in order to free themselves from poverty. However, because they violated the terms and conditions, Pete's spirit is trapped in the supernatural realm, making his body resemble that of a paralyzed person. Agus Pete is allowed to go out on the condition that he could find someone to replace him. If within 40 days he could not find a replacement, then Agus Pete would never return. Agus Pete tried to target Mbah Darmo as a replacement, but unfortunately, Mbah Darmo died first. Since Mbah Lanang had protection in the form of a golden egg, Ipung becomes Pete's next target.

Ipung begins to see apparitions of spirits and Agus Pete at school. At home, Mbah Wedok secretly performs a ritual of casting her husband's golden egg into the water, hoping to be freed from any disturbances by supernatural beings, but ends up falling ill shortly after. Wiwik, who comes to return the rantang belonging to Mbah Wedok, sees Ipung's pale face and gives him a cup of jamu. After drinking it, Ipung immediately enters the spiritual world and is trapped inside a house. Mbah Lanang immediately confronts Tirto and Agus Pete to retrieve his lost grandson. Mbah Manto then gives Mbah Lanang a wooden bird carving so that he can help Ipung. With the wooden carving, Mbah Lanang enters the spiritual world and guides Ipung back to the human realm. During their journey, they are blocked by Agus Pete, separating them. Agus Pete tries to kill Ipung by choking him, but is thwarted by Mbah Lanang, who is then choked by Pete.

The next day, Agus Pete regains consciousness and resumes his activities. Feeling that his plan is going smoothly, Pete plays with his bird and checks one of his birdcages. Pete is very shocked when he sees his wife's head is in the birdcage, causing him to run away screaming for help. In another place, Mbah Lanang walked barefoot slowly and arrived in front of his house.

== Cast ==
- Ardhana Jovin Aska Haryanto sebagai Ipung
- Landung Simatupang as Mbah Lanang, Ipung's grandfather
- Jamaluddin Latif as Agus Pete, Wiwik's husband
- Siti Fauziah as Wiwik, Agus Pete's wife
- Sri Isworowati as Mbah Wedok, Ipung's grandmother
- Fajar Suharno as Mbah Manto, Mbah Lanang's friend who has supernatural powers
- Teguh Mahesa as Mbah Darmo
- Alex Suhendra as Pakdhe Tirto
- Rafa Juliano Alfarizqi as Didit, Ipung's friend
- Muchlis Mustafa as Kholis, Ipung's friend
- Dyah Prima Ariyati as Kustini
- Ari Purnomo as Seteng
- Buyung Ispramadi as Prayit
- Noor Kharismawati as Ngadilah

== Production ==
After "Singsot" (2016) was released and received several awards, Prasetyo wanted to rewrite it for theatrical release. Thus, he rewrote it, the duration becoming 5 times longer than the original. For actors, Siti Fauziah, who had collaborated with him in his previous short "Tilik", was chosen to play Wiwik.

The film was shot in Jogja. It was chosen to provide an authentic atmosphere matching the story, where the prohibition of whistling after maghrib is part of local myths.
