= Sekaten =

Javanese traditional ceremony festival, fair and night market

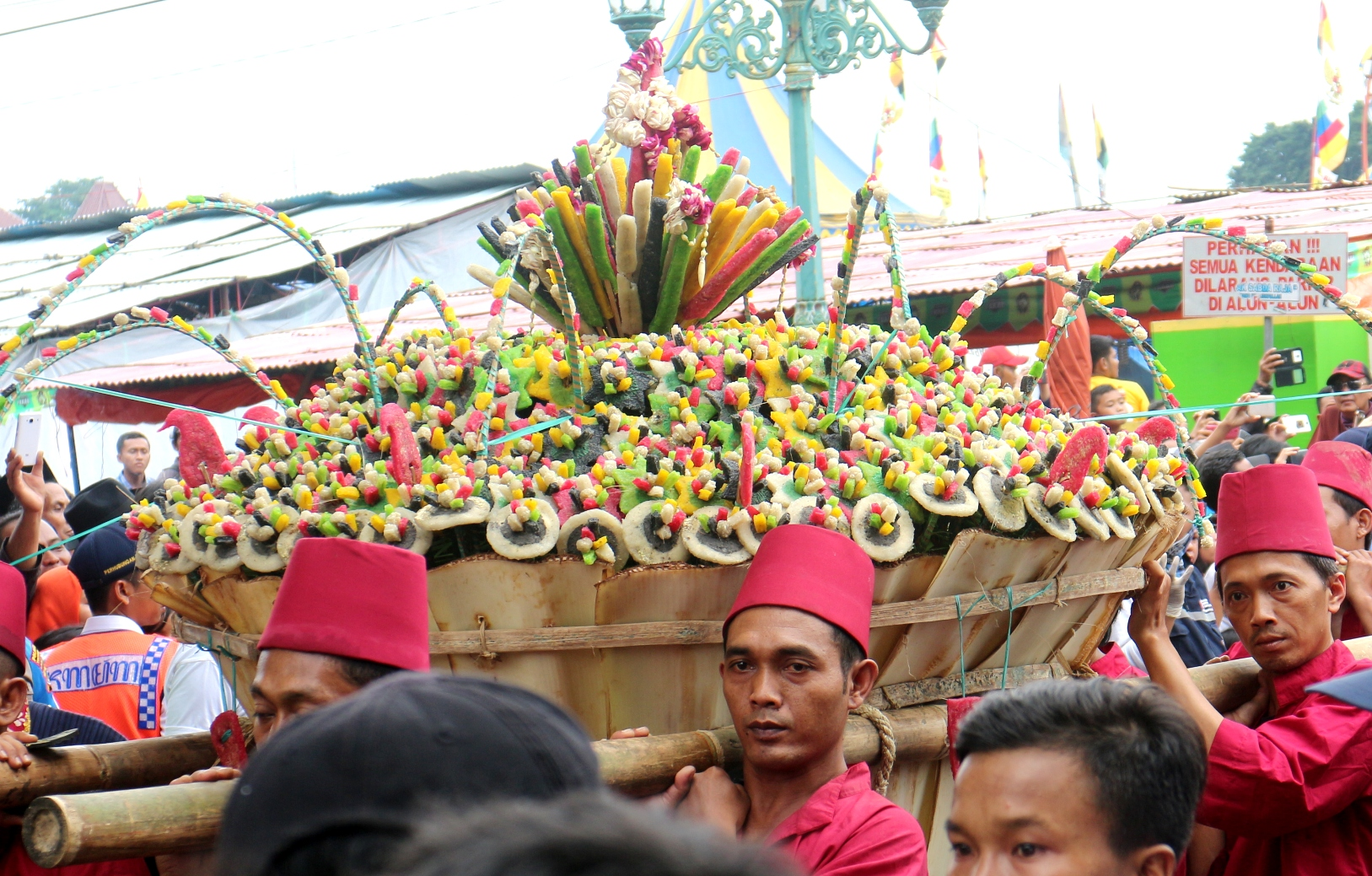
Gunungan grebeg muludan during sekaten

Sekaten (Javanese: ꦱꦼꦏꦠꦺꦤ꧀; from the Arabic word syahadatain) is a week-long Javanese traditional ceremony, festival, fair and pasar malam (night market) commemorating Mawlid (the birthday of the Islamic prophet Muhammad), celebrated annually started on 5th day through the 12th day of (Javanese Calendar) Mulud month (corresponding to Rabi' al-awwal in Islamic Calendar).

The festivities usually took place in northern alun-alun (square) in Yogyakarta, and simultaneously also celebrated in northern alun-alun of Surakarta. This ceremony originally were initiated by Sultan Hamengkubuwana I, the founder of Yogyakarta Sultanate to promote the Islamic faith.

== Gamelan Sekaten ==
On day one, the ceremony commences after the Isya evening prayer with a royal procession of royal guards and 'abdi dalem' court officials accompanying two sets of centuries old gamelan traditional music instruments, the Kyai Nogo Wilogo and Kyai Guntur Madu. The royal procession, led by the Sultan and Governor of Yogyakarta or his representative, begins in Pendopo Ponconiti, the main hall of Kraton Yogyakarta and proceeds towards Yogyakarta Great Mosque in northern Alun-Alun. The Kyai Nogo Wilogo gamelan will be placed at the northern pavilion of Grand Mosque, while Gamelan Kyai Guntur Madu will be placed at Pagongan pavilion in southern side of the mosque. These two set of sacred gamelans will be played simultaneously everyday until the 11th day of Maulud month through seven consecutive days. During the last day the two gamelans will be returned into the Kraton.

The Gamelan Sekaten of Surakarta are played in the same manner as their Yogyakarta counterparts, and are brought out to the mosque and returned to the palace in a royal procession led by the Sunan of Surakarta and the Mayor and City Council of Surakarta.

== Tumplak Wajik ==
Two days before Grebeg Muludan, the ceremony called Tumplak Wajik was held in palace Magangan field in 4:00 PM afternoon. This ceremony is started by kotekan ceremony which incorporate singing traditional songs accompanied with rhythmic hitting of kentongan (bamboo or wooden slit drum) and lumpang (rice mortar and pestle), that marked the making of Gunungan which will be carried in Grebeg Mulud festival. The traditional Javanese kue called wajik which is diamond-shaped sticky rice in palm sugar, is an essential part of this ceremony, and included within gunungan offering. The song played in this Tumplak Wajik ceremony is usually the popular Javanese traditional songs, such as Lompong Keli, Tundhung Setan, Owal awil.

== Grebeg Muludan ==
In Yogyakarta, the main event of Sekaten is called the Grebeg Muludan that held in 12th day (exactly during the birthday of Muhammad) starting in 8:00 am. The main Gunungan (Javanese: mountain), a model of mountain made of sticky rice, sweets, various foods, crackers, fruits and vegetables, were guarded by 10 units of bregodo (brigade) of the royal guards of the palace (the companies under His Majesty's Kraton Guard Regiment): Wirobrojo, Daeng, Patangpuluh, Jogokaryo, Prawirotomo, Nyutro, Ketanggung, Mantrijero, Surokarso, and Bugis Companies, together with the Royal Guard Battalion of the Duchy of Pakualaman.

The Gunungan will be carried in processions from Kemandungan through Sitihinggil and Pagelaran hall and finally ended in Grand Mosque. After the prayer, the Gunungan that symbolize the wealth and prosperity of Mataram Sultanate will be picked, fought over and ripped apart by the people that already waiting in the square, as they believed this objects is sacred, potent and could bring good luck, prosperity and wealth upon their households. Usually these parts of Gunungan will be kept in the house for luck, or buried in the rice fields as the traditional Javanese farmers believed that these objects will grant their fields fertility and protection from locust, plagues, and any misfortunes that might befell them.
