= Tumpeng =

Indonesian cone-shaped rice dish

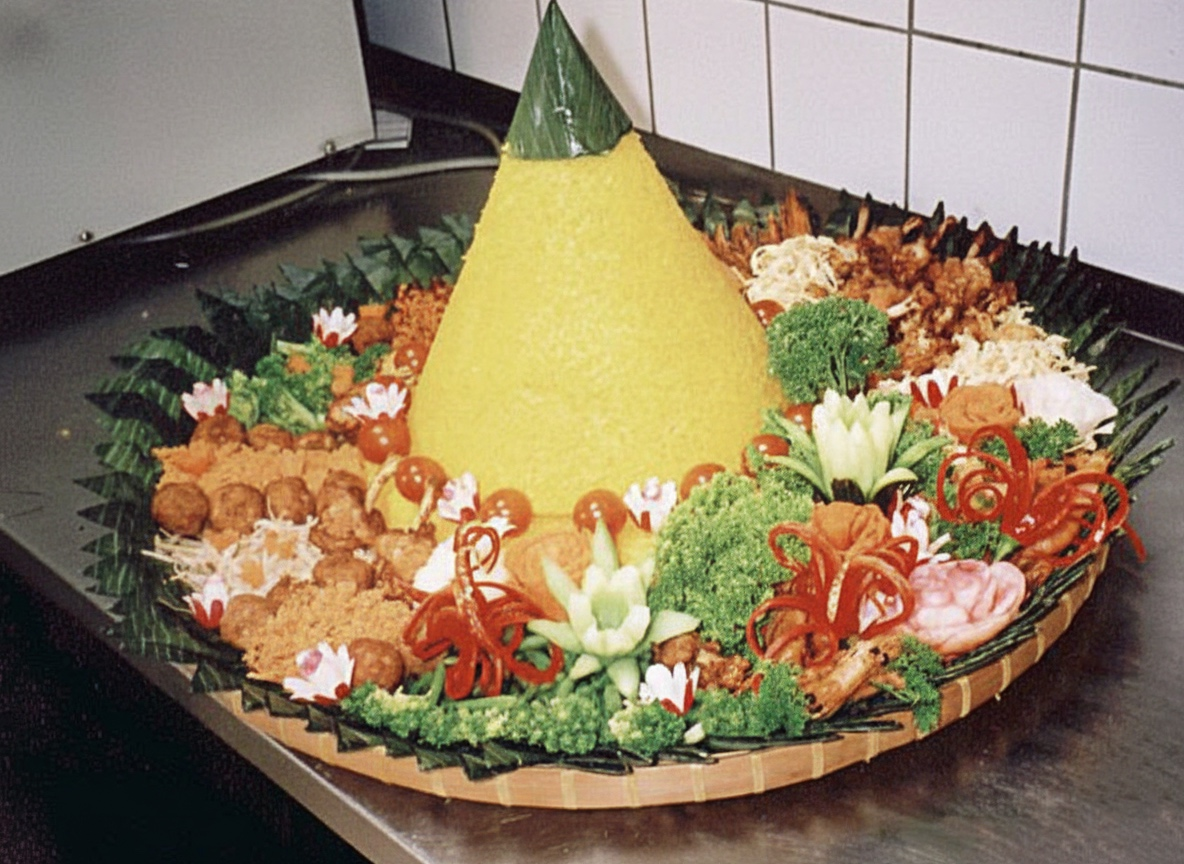
- Tumpeng: cone-shaped rice surrounded by assorted Indonesian dishes
- Course: Main course
- Place of origin: Indonesia
- Region or state: Java, Nationwide
- Associated cuisine: Indonesia
- Serving temperature: Hot or room temperature
- Main ingredients: Cone-shaped rice, urab (vegetables in shredded coconut), fried chicken, fried tempeh, boiled marble egg, shredded omelette, salted anchovy, and peanuts
- Variations: Tumpeng robyong, tumpeng putih, tumpeng nasi uduk, tumpeng slametan (nasi kuning)

Tumpeng (Javanese: ꦠꦸꦩ꧀ꦥꦼꦁ; Balinese: ᬢᬸᬫ᭄ᬧᭂᬂ) is an Indonesian cone-shaped rice dish with side dishes of vegetables and meat originating from Javanese cuisine. Traditionally featured in the slametan ceremony, the rice is made by using a cone-shaped woven bamboo container. As its counterpart the Spanish paella, today it can be found in other celebrations as well, such as for birthdays or parties. The rice itself may be plain steamed rice, uduk rice (cooked with coconut milk), or yellow rice (uduk rice colored with turmeric).

The rice cone is set out on the tampah (rounded woven bamboo container), covered with a banana leaf, and surrounded by assorted Indonesian dishes. In 2013, the Indonesian Ministry of Tourism and Creative Economy promoted tumpeng as one of 30 Indonesian culinary icons and declared it Indonesia's official national dish in 2014, describing it as "the dish that binds the diversity of Indonesian various culinary traditions".

Tumpeng is a symbol of gratitude. According to folklore in Java and Bali, the cone-shaped dish symbolises life and the glory of God as the creator of nature, and the side dishes and vegetables represent the life and harmony of nature. Usually, tumpeng is served with spinach, which is a traditional symbol of prosperity in Javanese agricultural society.

== Surrounding dishes ==
The cone-shaped rice is surrounded by assorted Indonesian dishes, such as urap vegetables, ayam goreng (fried chicken), ayam bakar (grilled chicken), empal gepuk (sweet and spicy fried beef), abon sapi (beef floss), semur (beef stew in sweet soy sauce), teri kacang (anchovy with peanuts), fried prawn, telur pindang (boiled marble egg), shredded omelette, tempe orek (sweet and dry fried tempeh), perkedel kentang (mashed potato fritters), perkedel jagung (corn fritters), sambal goreng ati (liver in chilli sauce), sliced cucumbers and many other things.

== Variations ==
There are several variants of tumpeng, determined according to the ceremonies.

- Tumpeng Robyong — This kind of tumpeng usually served in the traditional Javanese siraman (bridal shower) ceremony. Tumpeng is placed on bakul bamboo rice container; egg, shrimp paste, shallots and red chilli are placed on top.
- Tumpeng Nujuh Bulan — This kind of tumpeng is served in the seventh month of pregnancy (prenatal ceremony). Tumpeng is made of plain white rice. The main tumpeng is surrounded by six smaller tumpeng; all tumpengs are erected on tampah covered with banana leaf.
- Tumpeng Pungkur — Used in the ceremony for the death of a virgin or unmarried male or female. It is made from white rice surrounded only with vegetable dishes. Later, the tumpeng must be cut vertically into two parts evenly and placed one against another.

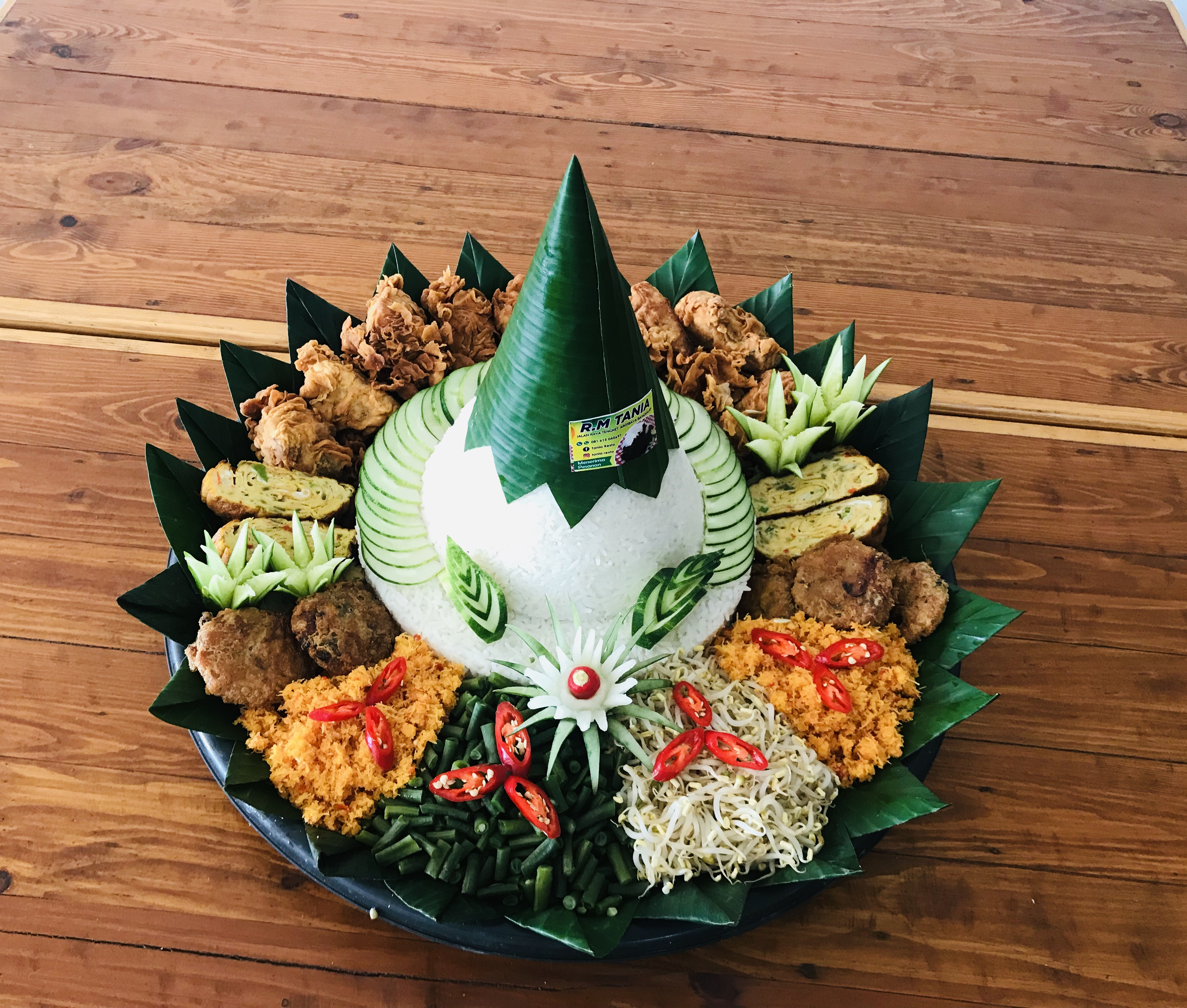
Nasi putih (white rice) tumpeng surrounded with dishes

- Tumpeng Putih — White tumpeng, uses white rice since white symbolizes holiness in Javanese culture. This kind of tumpeng is employed in sacred ceremonies.
- Tumpeng Nasi Kuning — Yellow tumpeng: The yellow color represents gold, wealth, abundance, and high morals. This kind of tumpeng is employed in cheerful and happy festivities and celebrations, such as births, engagements, marriage, Eid, Christmas, etc.
- Tumpeng Nasi Uduk (also called tumpeng tasyakuran) — The uduk rice (rice cooked in coconut milk) employed in the Maulud Nabi ceremony: celebrating the birthday of Muhammad.
- Tumpeng Seremonial/Modifikasi — This contemporary tumpeng is relatively more open for modifications and adaptations. It depends on the discretion, taste, and request of the host.
- Mini Tumpeng — This kind of small rice cone, which is usually served for 1 person like a rice box. The uniqueness about it is a mini cone served in a unique place with a transparent mica lid, so food can be seen from the outside.
- Character Tumpeng Rice — This is usually used for birthdays or conventions, and young children and pop culture fans love it because of its unique shape, but the unique shape can also be used like a cone for a birthday celebration or fan conventions.

== Contemporary tradition ==
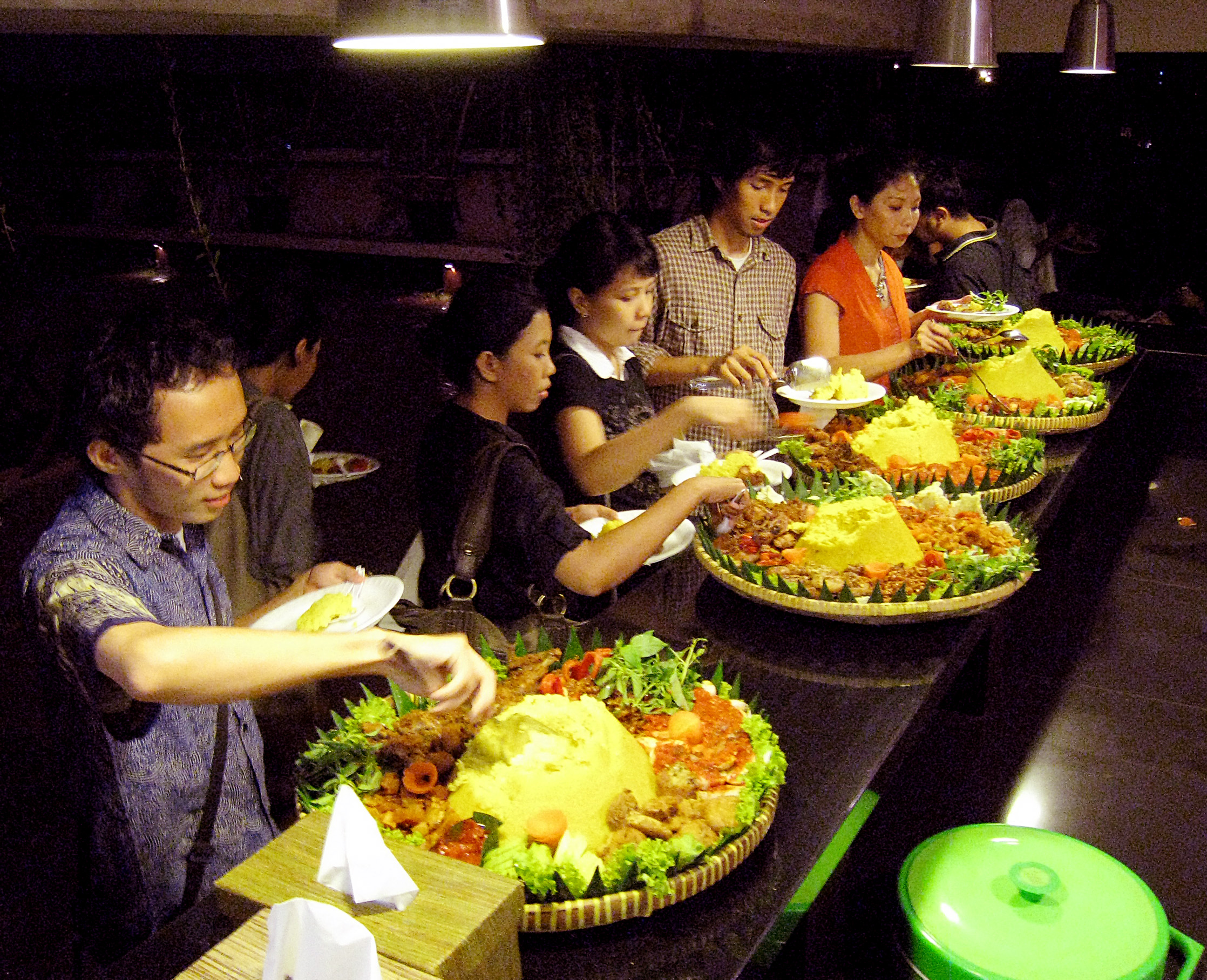
Several nasi kuning tumpengs served during a feast.

Today, most Indonesians serve tumpeng as a dish to celebrate a special occasion, such as a birthday party, arisan, family or neighborhood gathering, farewell party, celebrations, recitals, and many other joyous events. Because of its festive and celebration value, up until now tumpeng sometimes seen as an Indonesian counterpart of the Spanish paella or birthday cake.

In 2009, Garuda Indonesia started offering Mini Nasi Tumpeng Nusantara as part of its new concept to highlight Indonesia's hospitality.

Tumpeng is offered in Indonesian restaurants abroad, such as in neighboring Singapore and the Netherlands as well as in Kelantan.

The building of Suharto's Purna Bhakti Pertiwi Museum in Taman Mini Indonesia Indah, Jakarta, took shape of tumpeng.

== See also ==
- Javanese cuisine
- Javanese culture
- Indonesian cuisine
- List of rice dishes
- Rice
