= Yogyakarta Kraton Guards =

Ceremonial and security force in Yogyakarta, Indonesia

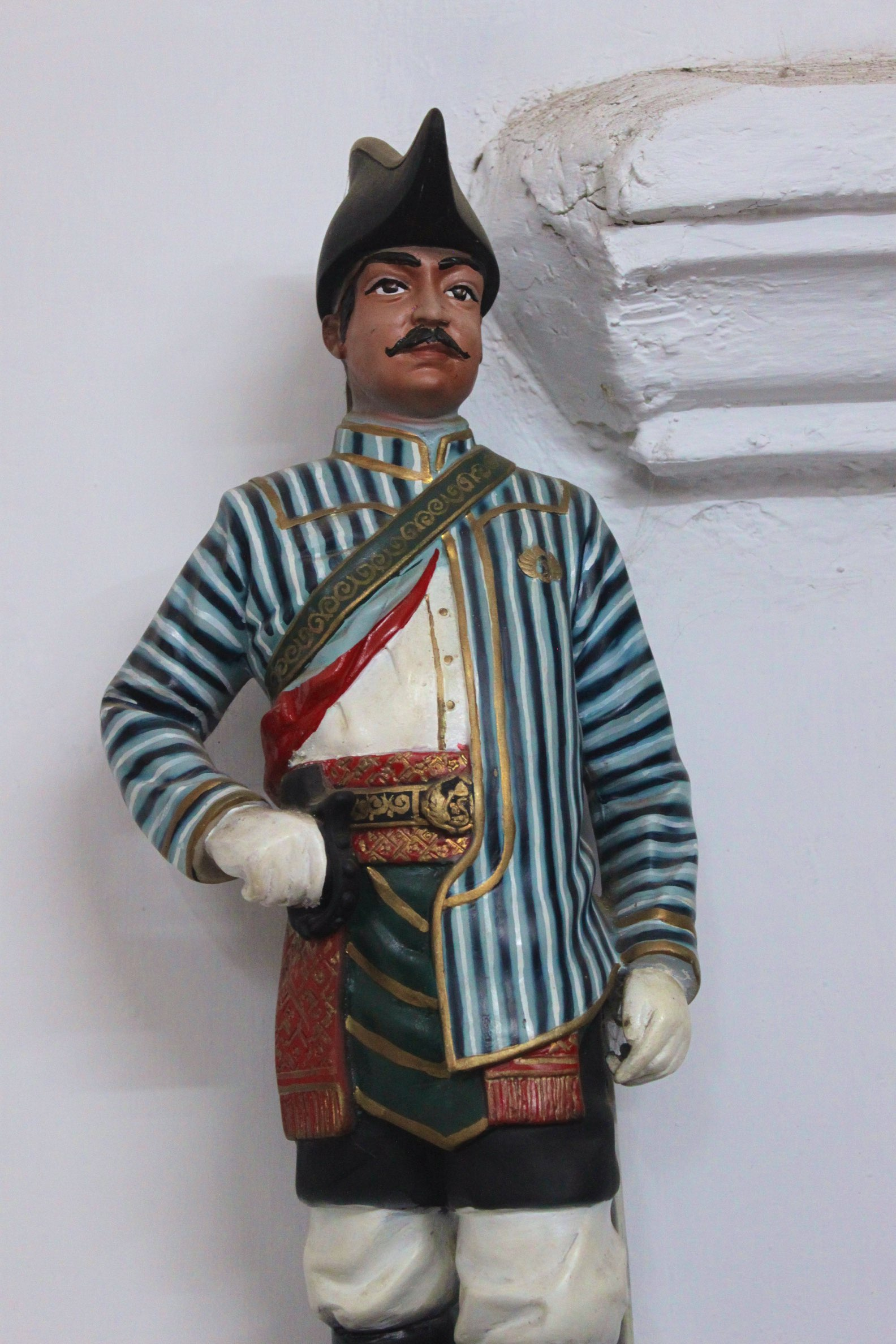
Sculpture of Ketanggung warrior (Javanese: ꦏꦺꦠꦁꦒꦸꦁ) in the museum of Kraton Ngayogyakarta Hadiningrat

The Yogyakarta Kraton Guards (Note: Javanese: ꦥꦿꦗꦸꦫꦶꦠ꧀ ꦏꦺꦫꦠꦺꦴꦤ꧀ ꦔꦪꦺꦴꦒꦾꦏꦂꦠ ꦲꦢꦶꦤꦶꦔꦿꦠ꧀, Indonesian: Prajurit Keraton Ngayogyakarta Hadiningrat) are the contingents of soldiers, known as the Bregada, tasked with the guarding of Kraton Ngayogyakarta Hadiningrat, the official residence of the Sultans of Yogyakarta. They serve ceremonial and security functions. By tradition, the reigning Sultan of Yogyakarta serves as Colonel-in-chief of the Guards.

== History ==
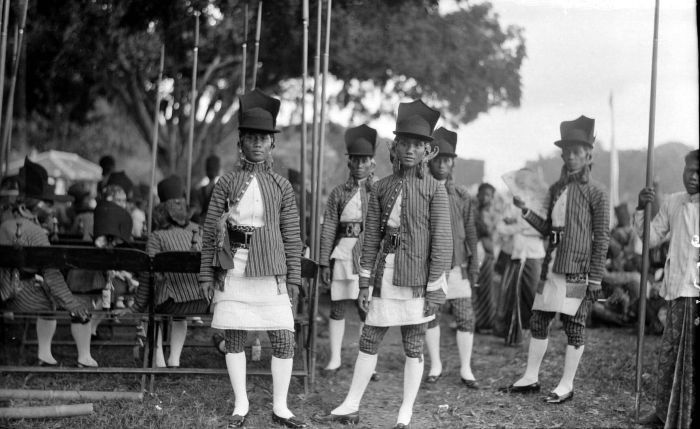
The Kraton Guards in 1920

The Yogyakarta Kraton Guards were formed during the reign of Hamengkubuwono I around the eighteenth century. The soldiers of the infantry and cavalry troops used firearms, in the form of rifles and cannons. For about half a century, the Kraton Guards were strong, as was proven when Hamengkubuwono II led an armed resistance against the invasion of British troops under General Gillespie in June 1812. Following the reign of Hamengkubuwono III, the British company was able to dissolve the army of the Yogyakarta Sultanate. In an agreement on October 2, 1813, signed by Sultan Hamengkubuwono III and Stamford Raffles, it was written that the Sultanate of Yogyakarta was not justified in maintaining strong armed forces. Under the supervision of the British Government of the Company, the palace could have only limited armed entities. It was no longer possible for them to perform military functions. Since then, the function of armed units has been limited to guarding the sultan, the palace, and its traditions.

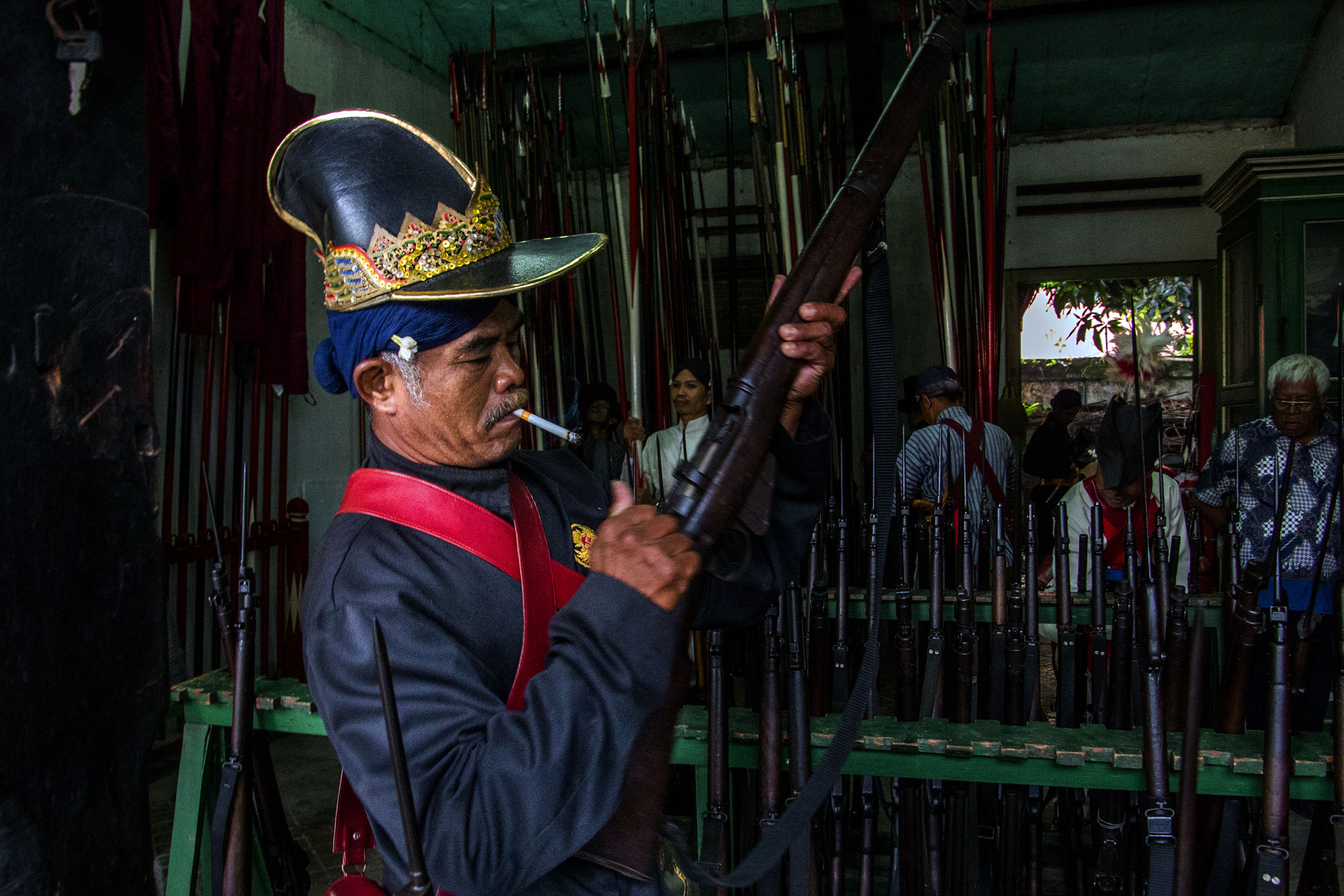
Prawirotomo (Javanese: ꦥꦿꦮꦶꦫꦺꦴꦠꦺꦴꦩꦺꦴ) soldier is a soldier who has advantages compared to other soldiers, this is not separated from the origin of the soldier's existence of 1000 members of Mataram army who helped the prince Mangkubumi to fight the Dutch East India Company.

When the Dutch East India Company returned to power, the armed forces that had been weakened were increasingly reduced until they had no military relevance. According to existing records, from the reign of Hamengkubuwono VII to the reign of Hamengkubuwono VIII between 1877 and 1939 13 companies of the Kraton Guard Regiment existed:

- Sumoatmojo (Javanese: ꦱꦸꦩꦺꦴꦮꦠ꧀ꦩꦺꦴꦗꦺꦴ)
- Ketanggung (Javanese: ꦏꦺꦠꦁꦒꦸꦁ)
- Patangpuluh (Javanese: ꦥꦠꦁꦥꦸꦭꦸꦃ)
- Wirobrojo (Javanese: ꦮꦶꦫꦧꦿꦗ)
- Jogokaryo (Javanese: ꦗꦺꦴꦒꦺꦴꦏꦂꦪꦺꦴ)
- Nyutro (Javanese: ꦚꦸꦠꦿꦺꦴ)
- Dhaeng (Javanese: ꦮꦶꦫꦧꦿꦗ)
- Jager (Javanese: ꦗꦒꦺꦂ)
- Prawirotomo (Javanese: ꦥꦿꦮꦶꦫꦺꦴꦠꦺꦴꦩꦺꦴ)
- Mantrijero (Javanese: ꦩꦤ꧀ꦠꦿꦶꦗꦺꦫꦺꦴ)
- Langenastro (Javanese: ꦭꦔꦺꦤꦱ꧀ꦠꦿꦺꦴ)
- Surokarso (Javanese: ꦱꦸꦫꦺꦴꦏꦂꦱꦺꦴ)
- Bugis (Javanese: ꦧꦸꦒꦶꦱ꧀)

== Modern era ==
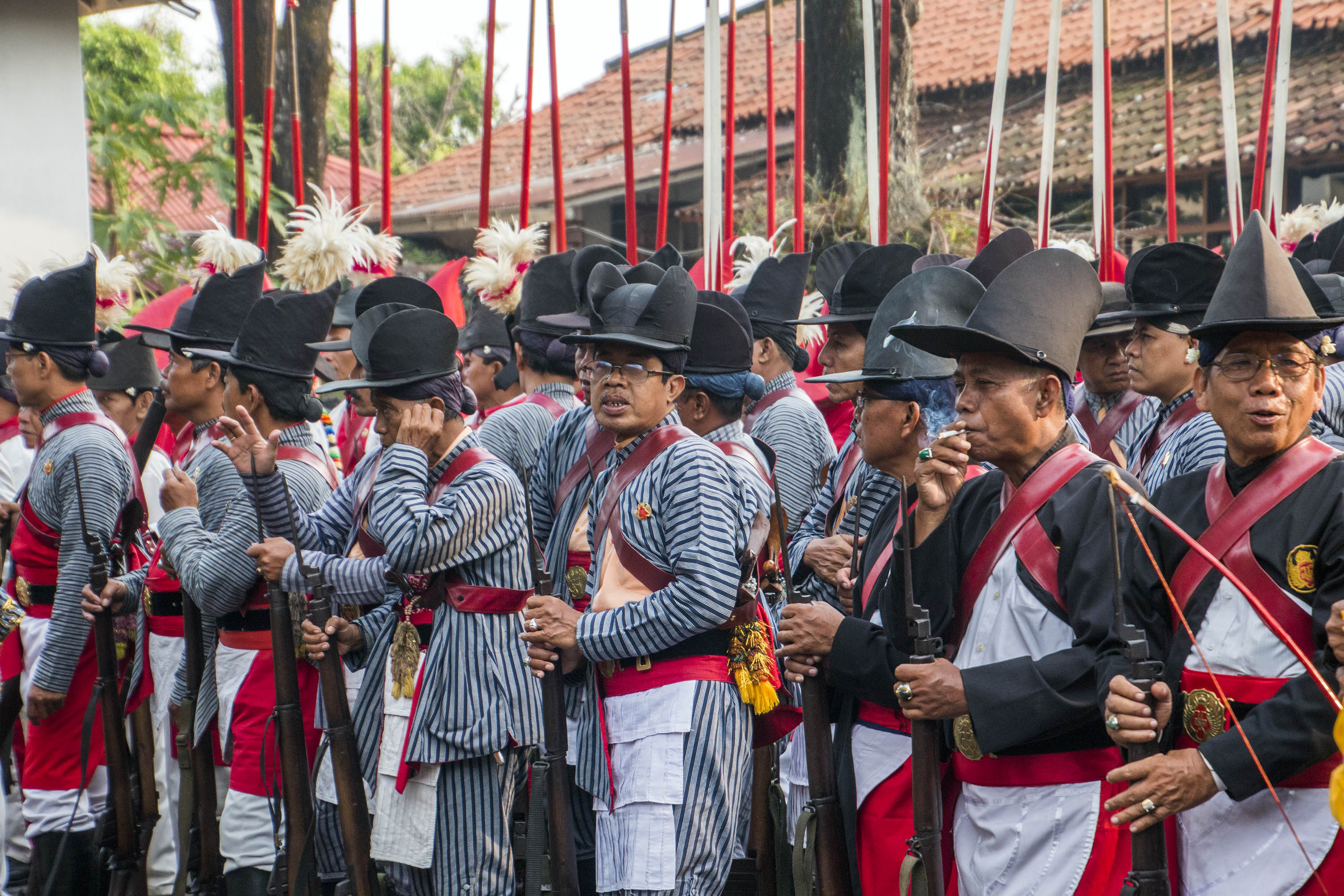
The Kraton Guards just before a ceremony of Grebeg Maulud in the Bangsal Kemandungan courtyard of Ngayogyakarta Hadiningrat Palace, with the musketeers of the Patangpuluh, Jogokaryo, and Prawiratama companies present holding their rifles.

In 1942, the Kraton Guards were dissolved by the Japanese government, but in 1970, they were restored at the orders of Sultan Hamengkubuwono IX. Ten companies were officially reactivated with some changes in their structure. Originally, 13 companies formed the Kraton Guard Regiment. The changes in the newer version include changes to dress uniforms, ceremonial weapons, the number of personnel, and recruitment techniques.

The ten companies (two battalions) of the Kraton Guard Regiment can be seen by the public at least three times a year, at the Garebeg Mulud, Garebeg Besar, and Garebeg Syawal ceremonies, in the alun-alun of Keraton Ngayogyakarta Hadiningrat. These ten companies are reinforced by the two companies of the Royal Guard Battalion of Pakualaman. When combined, the RGB serves as the unofficial 3rd (reserve) Battalion of the regiment for events around Yogyakarta City and the Yogyakarta Special Region. The 10 companies consist of around 90 active personnel and each is organized into a platoon of musketeers (carrying Lee-Enfields and Beretta BM59s) and lancers each. The companies are:

- Wirobrojo (Javanese: ꦮꦶꦫꦧꦿꦗ)
- Dhaeng (Javanese: ꦣꦌꦁ or ꦣꦲꦺꦁ)
- Patangpuluh (Javanese: ꦥꦠꦁꦥꦸꦭꦸꦃ)
- Jogokaryo (Javanese: ꦗꦺꦴꦒꦺꦴꦏꦂꦪꦺꦴ)
- Mantrijero (Javanese: ꦩꦤ꧀ꦠꦿꦶꦗꦺꦫꦺꦴ)
- Prawirotomo (Javanese: ꦥꦿꦮꦶꦫꦺꦴꦠꦺꦴꦩꦺꦴ)
- Mantrijero (Javanese: ꦩꦤ꧀ꦠꦿꦶꦗꦺꦫꦺꦴ)
- Ketanggung (Javanese: ꦏꦺꦠꦁꦒꦸꦁ),
- Surokarso (Javanese: ꦱꦸꦫꦺꦴꦏꦂꦱꦺꦴ)
- Bugis (Javanese: ꦧꦸꦒꦶꦱ꧀)

Each of the 10 companies carry their company colors and have corps of drums attached.
