= Slametan =

Indonesian celebratory meals

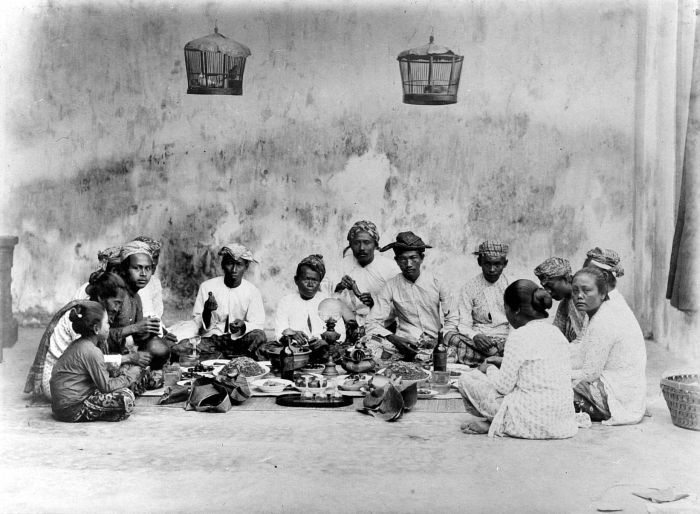
A slamatan in a mosque in Java during the colonial era.

The slametan (or selametan, slamatan, and selamatan) is the communal feast from Java, symbolizing the social unity of those participating in it. Clifford Geertz considered it the core ritual in Javanese religion, in particular the abangan variant. The feast is common among the closely related Javanese, Sundanese and Madurese people.

A slametan can be given to celebrate almost any occurrence, including birth, marriage, death, moving to a new house, and so forth. Depending on the intention, the mood and emphasis may vary somewhat, but the main structure is the same. Geertz categorizes them into four main types:

- Those relating to the crises of life: birth, circumcision, marriage, and death
- Those associated with events of the Islamic calendar
- The bersih désa ("cleaning of the village"), concerned with the social integration of the village
- Those held irregularly depending on unusual occurrences: departing for a long trip, moving residence, changing personal names, healing from illnesses, recovering from the effect of sorcery, and so on

The ceremony takes its name from the Javanese word slamet, from Arabic: salam, which refers to a peaceful state of equanimity, in which nothing will happen. This is what the host intends for both himself and his guests, by experiencing the egalitarian structure of the slametan and the petitions of supernatural protection from spirits.

In Geertz's fieldwork in Mojokuto in the 1950s, he found that costs of slametans varied from 3 to 5,000 Indonesian rupiahs, depending on the type and the relative wealth of the host.

== Procedure ==
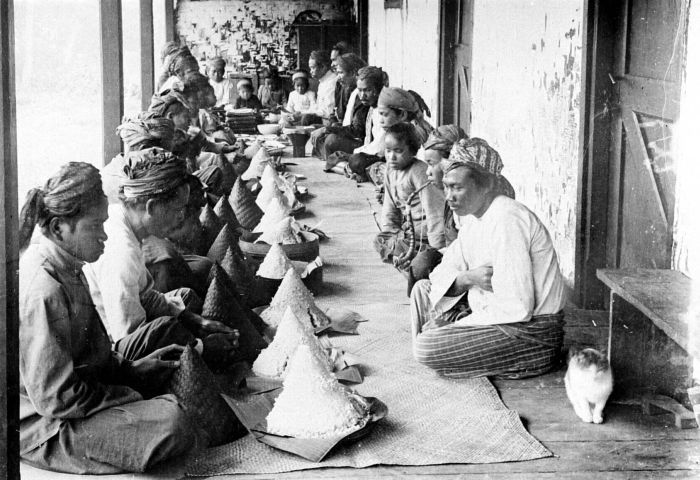
A Slametan in a mosque in Cibodas, with tumpeng as its main menu. ca. 1907.

Slametans are generally held in the evening, after evening prayer is finished. The date is determined either by the occurrence it is celebrating (for births and deaths, for example), or on auspicious days in the Javanese calendar. The guests, always men, are always close neighbors, and the selection of guests is based entirely on proximity, and not whether they are friends or relatives. Traditionally the guests are called by a messenger of the host (usually a child of his) only five or ten minutes before the slametan is to begin to attend the dinner, and they must drop whatever they are doing to come. Today, the invitations are sent via emails and social media to ensure attendance.

When they arrive, the guests sit on floor mats around the food which has been placed in the center, while incense fills the room. The ceremony begins with a formal speech (udjub) in high Javanese. The speech thanks the attendees for coming, presents the reason for the slametan, announces his intentions and petitions the spirits to secure for himself and his guests a state of equanimity (slamet, hence the name of the ritual), and finally apologizes for any errors in his speech and the humble inadequacy of the food. During pauses in the speech, the audience responds with a solemn "inggih" ("yes").

Following the speech, somebody present gives an Arabic chant-prayer. Many will not know how, but the host makes sure that someone there has attended a religious school (usually a kyai); for special occasions, he may even invite the village religious specialist (the modin). Fragments of the Al-Qur'an, especially the Al-Fatiha, are most commonly used, although special prayers may be used if they are known. At pauses, the audience says aamiin. The prayer leader receives a small payment (wadjib).

At last, the food is served. While the ceremony is strictly for men, the food preparation falls upon the women in the family, who for larger ceremonies may draw on kin to assist in the preparation. Each guest receives a cup of tea and a banana-leaf dish containing each sort of food in the center of the room. The food is fancier than average, and each variety has a symbolic meaning, which is sometimes explained in the speech. The host himself does not eat, nor does he serve the food, which one or two of the guests do. When everybody has a dish, the host invites them to eat, which they do quickly without speaking. After a few minutes, and before eating most of the food, the guests excuse themselves, and finish eating the food in their own homes, with their own wives and children. The whole ceremony usually lasts only ten or fifteen minutes.

== Timing and characteristics ==
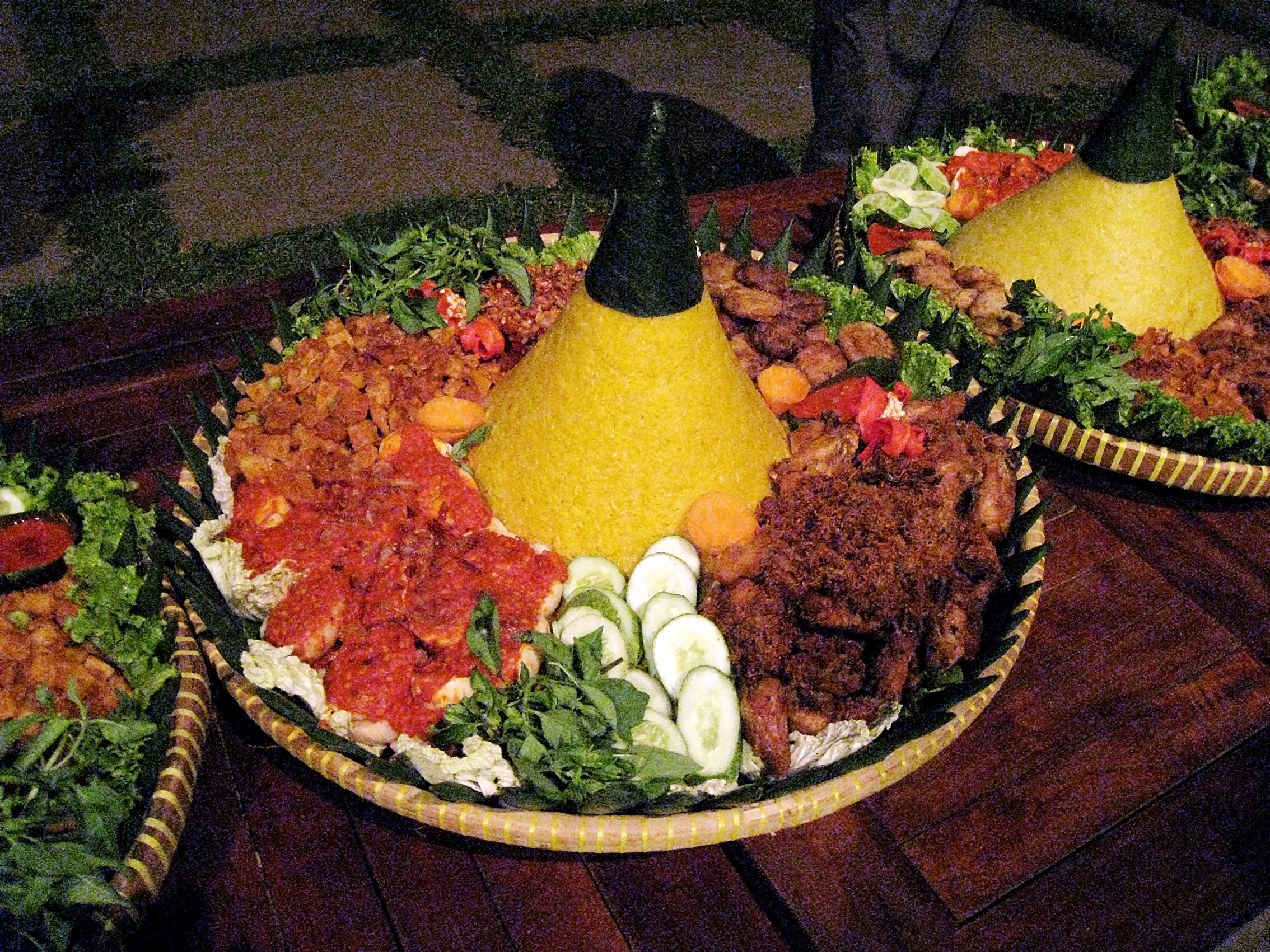
Tumpeng is commonly the main menu in a slametan.

=== Life cycle events ===
Around birth, there are four major slametans and a number of minor ones. The four major ones are:

- Tingkeban, at about seven months of pregnancy (held only for the first child of either the mother or father)
- Babaran or brokokan, at the birth itself
- Pasaran, five days after birth, including the naming of the child
- Pitonan, seven "months" after birth (a month being the 35-day cycle of the Javanese calendar)

The circumcision slametan (islamam or sunatan, held for boys between the ages of ten and fourteen) and the wedding slametan (kepanggihan) are similar in their ceremony and foods offered, and can be seen as coming-of-age ceremonies for boys and girls, respectively.

Funerals (layatan) generally take place as soon as possible after the death, and inevitably involve the religious specialist (modin) of the village. Slametans are held the day of the death, and then repeated in increasing size (both in number of guests and length of the chant) three, seven, forty, and 100 days after the death, the first and second anniversaries, and 1000 days after the death. The final one is the most elaborate, and is thought to mark the point when the body has completely decayed to dust.

=== Islamic feasts ===
The most important of the calendrical slametans are for the Prophet's birthday (Muludan, on 12 Rabi' al-awwal) and near the end of Ramadan (Maleman). Other notable holidays infrequently have slametans, and Satu Suro, the New Year's Day (1 Muharram) is celebrated by those who are self-consciously Muslim. Because these dates are shared by everybody, it is common to attend slametans for many of one's neighbors in succession. For this reason, they tend to be relatively small, and particularly based on the principle of inviting neighbors.

=== Community feasts ===
The bersih désa is always held in Dhu al-Qi'dah (Sela), the eleventh month, on different days according to village tradition. This slametan is given at the place of burial of the dhanyang désa, the guardian spirit of the village. In santri villages, it may take place at a mosque and consist entirely of Muslim prayers. For this type of slametan, all families in the village are expected to contribute food, with the adult head of each family obliged to attend.

=== Personal feasts ===
Geertz's final category of slametans, intermittently occurring and dependent on a specific situation, are somewhat less frequent and tend to be smaller affairs. Reasons for holding these slametans include changing residences, changing names, going on a journey, bad dreams (it can prevent the fearful event), prevention or encouragement of rain, anniversaries of clubs and organizations, sorcery, healing, and others.
