= List of Indonesian inventions and discoveries =

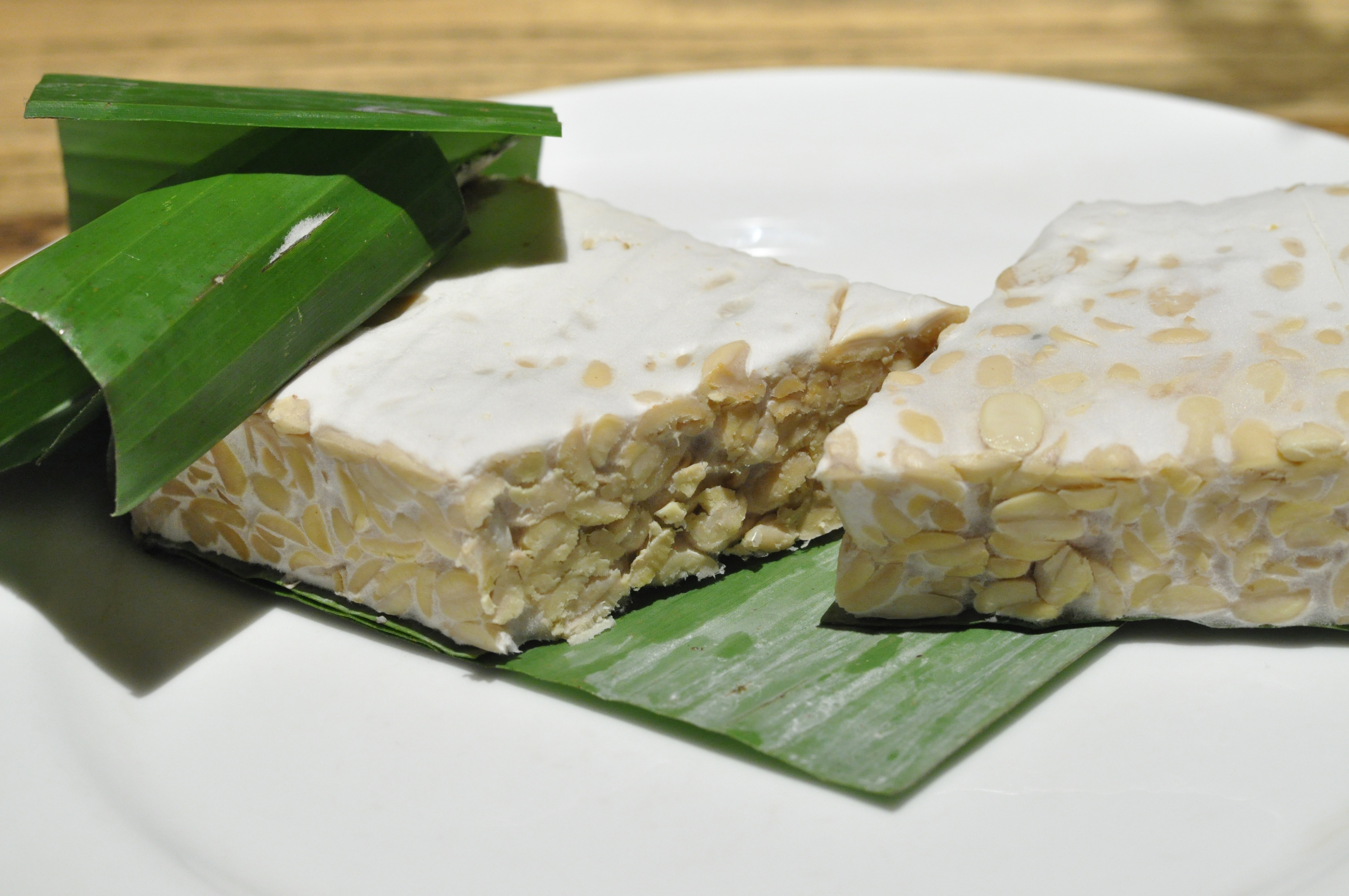
Indonesians has developed a long tradition of fermentation technique, among others are tempeh, oncom, tuak, brem and tapai.

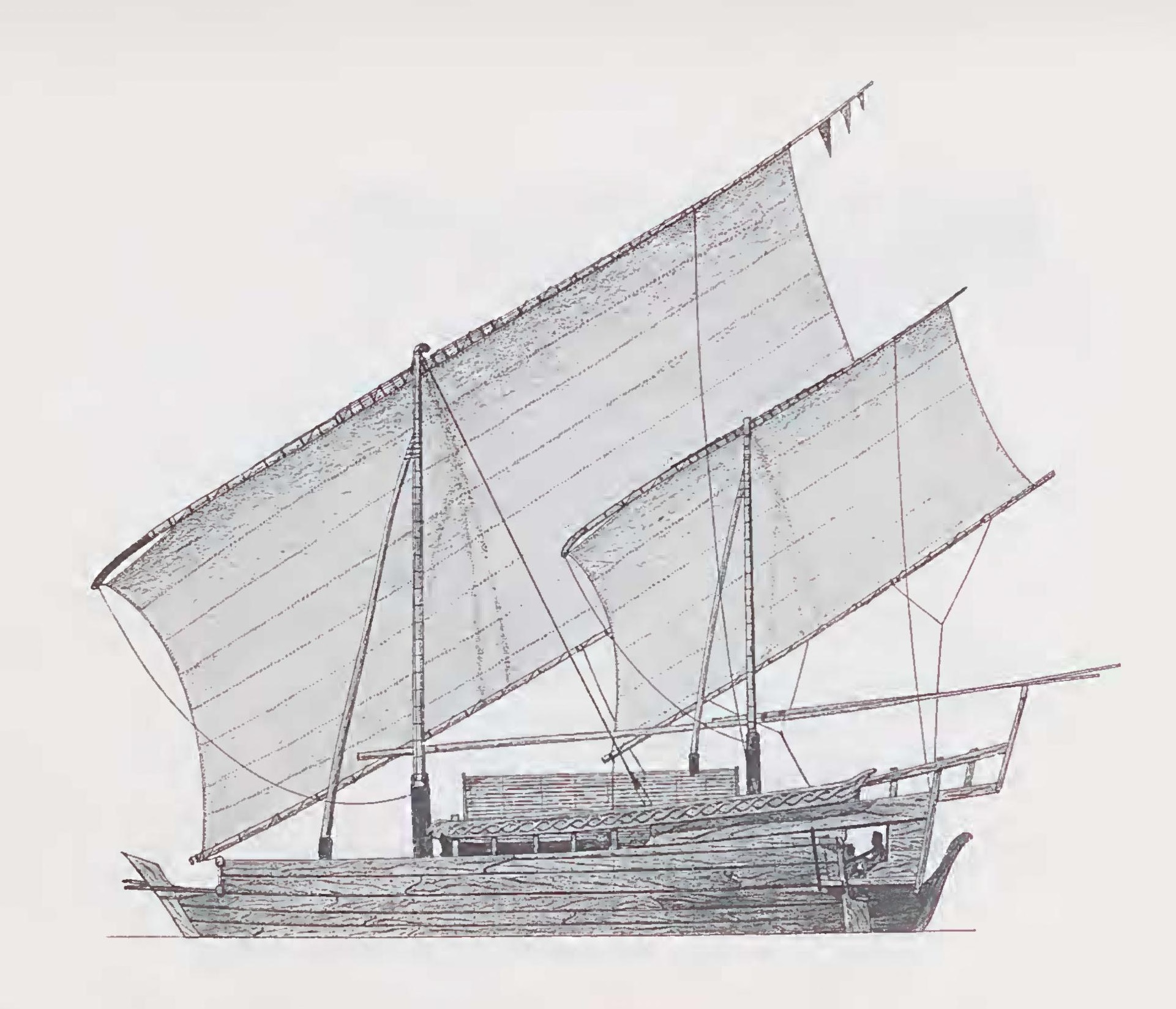
Tanja sail, an Indonesian invention with global influence, because it allows ships to sail against the wind.

This list of Indonesian inventions and discoveries details the indigenous arts and techniques, cultural inventions, scientific discoveries and contributions of the people of Indonesian Archipelago — both ancient and modern state of Indonesia. As a developing nation, currently Indonesia suffers a shortage of scientific personnel and engineers. The lack of research and development, also hampers Indonesia's comparative competitiveness. Nevertheless, despite the shortcomings, its people and government continues their efforts to advance the nation's science and technology sectors. Among other things, by promoting innovation and technology through Indonesia Science Day.

Since ancient times, native Indonesians have accumulated knowledge and developed technology stemmed from necessities; from naval navigation knowledge, traditional shipbuilding technology, textile techniques, food processing to vernacular house building. Notable examples include jong, pinisi, perahu, Borobudur ship and sandeq vessels. In textile production, batik, ikat and songket were developed extensively by Indonesians. Living in tropical hot and humid environs, Indonesians also has developed the knowledge on food processing technology, especially fermentation, owed to the abundance of mold and fungi species in the region. Notable example includes tempeh, oncom, tuak, brem and tapai. In traditional art and entertainment, Indonesians have developed wayang kulit shadow theatre, various dance drama also gamelan orchestra.

The scientific pursuit, technical improvement and technological innovation are continuously developed to this day, among other by institution such as Indonesian Institute of Sciences. Indonesia has a number of industries that producing various advanced technology tools and vehicles; from shipbuilding to weaponry, armoured car to aeroplane. Today, Indonesia has developed their own aviation technology, with the development of CN-235, N-219 and N-245.

== Arts and entertainment ==
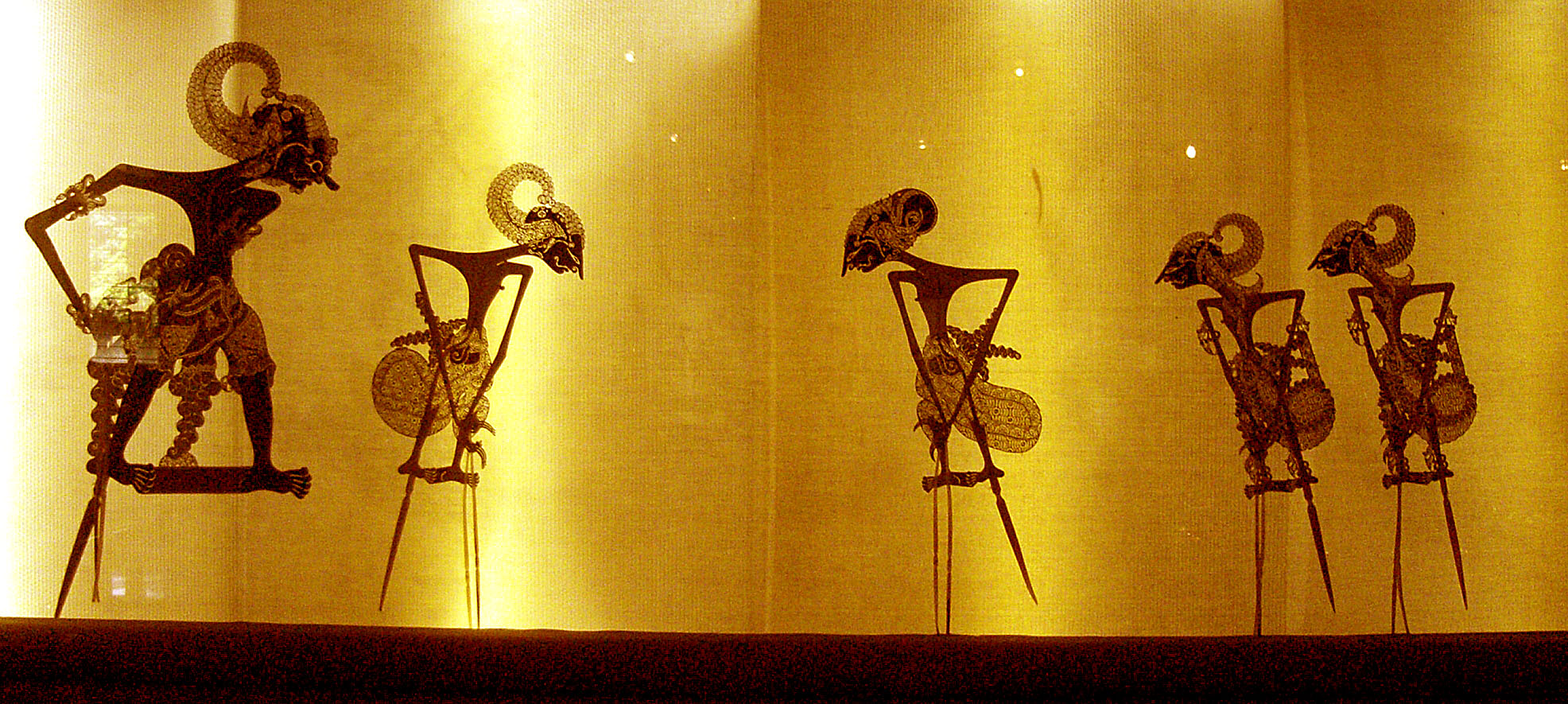
Wayang Purwa type, depicting five Pandawa, from left to right: Bimo, Arjuna, Yudhishthira, Nakula, and Sahadewa at the Indonesia Museum in Jakarta.

- Wayang, a form of traditional puppet theatre found in Indonesia. Variants including wayang kulit shadow play and wayang golek.
- Wayang orang, a type of classical Javanese dance drama theatrical performance with themes taken from episodes of the Ramayana or Mahabharata.
- Topeng, Indonesian mask dance-drama in which one or more mask-wearing, ornately costumed performers interpret traditional narratives concerning fabled kings, heroes and myths, accompanied by gamelan music.
- Barong, Balinese lion dance, Barong is a lion-like creature and character in the mythology of Bali. The battle between Barong and Rangda is featured in Barong dance to represent the eternal battle between good and evil.
- Ondel-ondel, a large Betawi puppet folk performance, is about 2.5 meters tall with ± 80 cm diameter, made of woven bamboo where human can fit into it. The word ondel-ondel refers to both the performance and the puppet.
- Javanese dance, the dances and art forms that were created and influenced by Javanese culture.
- Balinese dance, an ancient dance tradition that is part of the religious and artistic expression among the Balinese people of Bali. Balinese dance is dynamic, angular and intensely expressive.
- Kecak, a form of Balinese dance and music drama that was developed in the 1930s in Bali. Formed as a coordinated chants and arm movements.
- Saman, an intricately choreographed dance of thousand hands of Gayo ethnic group, Aceh.
- Ketoprak, a theatrical genre of Java featuring actors who may also sing to the accompaniment of the gamelan. It draws its stories from Javanese history and romances, invented as recent as 1923.
- Sandiwara, a genre of traditional theatrical drama of Indonesia. In general, it refer to any kinds of drama or theatrical performances, and literally sandiwara means "to pretend" or "to act". However, the term is often used to describe a genre of traditional drama of West Java, with notable example include the once famous Sandiwara Miss Tjitjih.

== Music ==
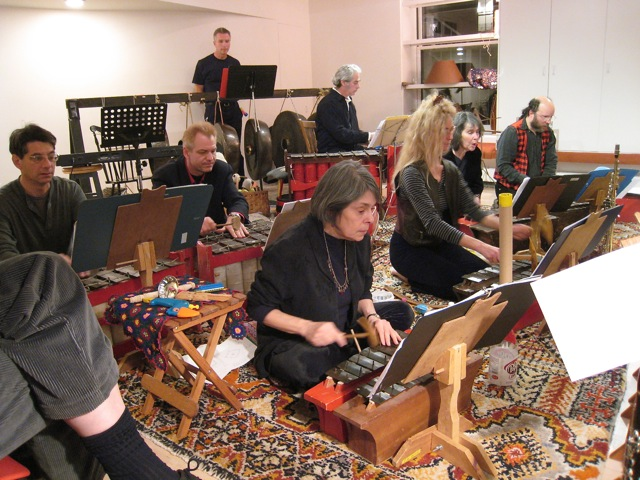
Gamelan Son of Lion, a Javanese-style iron American gamelan based in New York City that is devoted to new music, playing in SoHo, Manhattan.

- Gamelan, the traditional ensemble music native to Java and Bali made up predominantly of percussive instruments, especially metallophones.
- Angklung, the bamboo musical instrument made by attaching bamboo tubes into bamboo frame and shake it to create the sound, native to Sundanese of West Java.
- Kolintang, an ancient instrumental form of music composed on a row of small, horizontally laid gongs, especially prevalent in the eastern Malay Archipelago—the southern Philippines, eastern Indonesia (North Sulawesi, Maluku, East Nusa Tenggara), East Malaysia, Brunei and Timor.
- Keroncong, is the name of a ukulele-like instrument and also refer to a genre of Indonesian musical style. It was derived from Portuguese influence on colonial Indonesia.
- Langgam Jawa, a regional form of Indonesian kroncong music most often associated with the city of Surakarta (Solo). Langgam jawa utilizes a variety of non-native instruments, such as the flute, guitar, ukulele, cello and violin. However, these instruments are performed using a seven-tone Javanese gamelan scale known as pelog. The song mostly performed in Javanese.
- Campursari, a crossover of several contemporary Indonesian music genres, mainly Javanese Langgam Jawa and Dangdut.
- Dangdut, a popular genre of Indonesian folk and traditional popular music that was influenced by Hindustani, Malay, and Arabic music.
- Pop Indo, Indonesian pop music.
- Rock Indo, rock music from Indonesia.

== Game ==
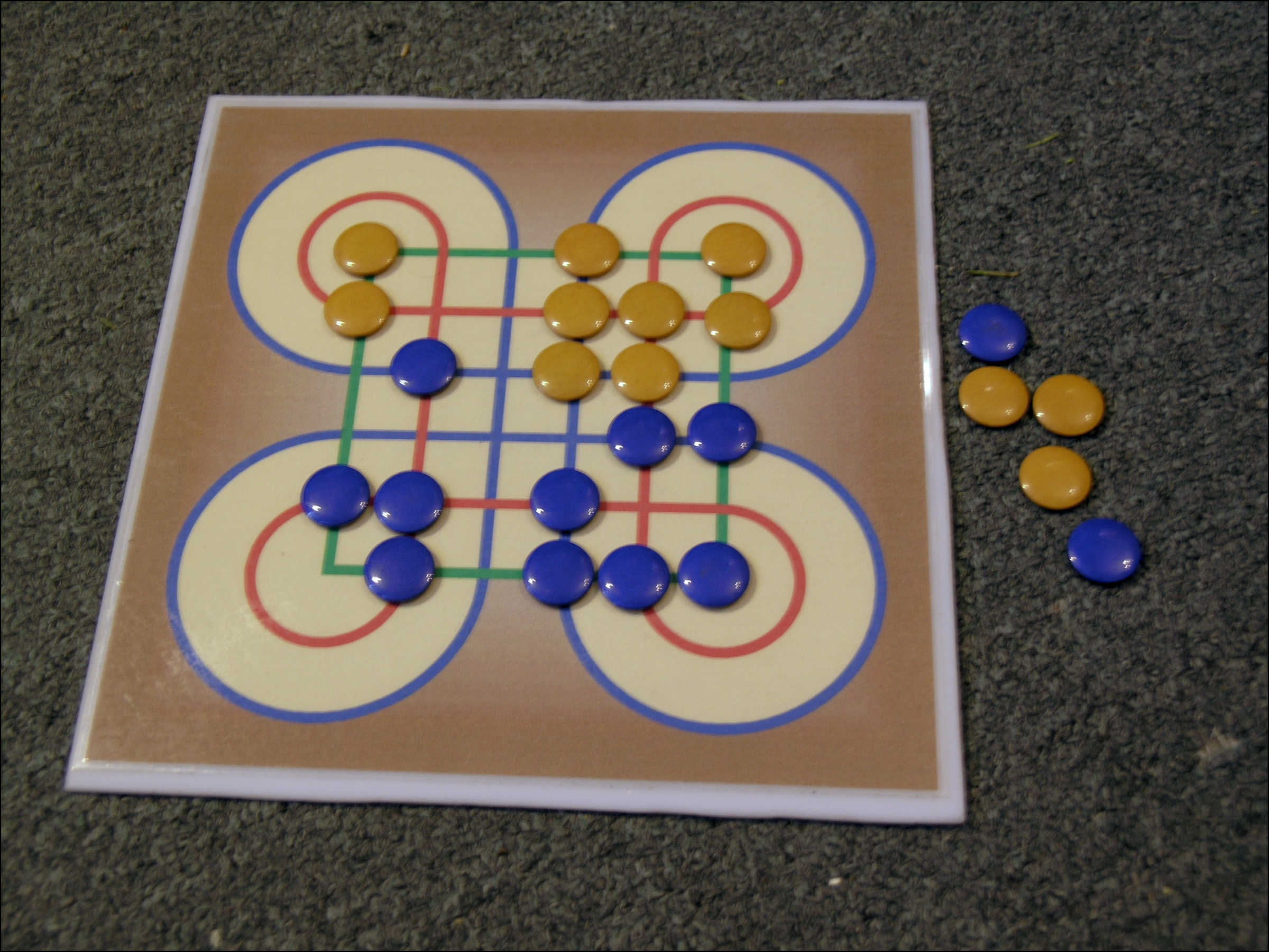
The Surakarta board game.

- Congklak, a mancala game played in Indonesia, Malaysia and Philippines. Although the origin is obscure, the oldest tradition of similar game can be traced to Javanese dakon with pitmarked stones from the bronze-Iron Age period of Indonesia.
- Galasin, or galah asin or gobak sodor, traditional Indonesian games.
- Surakarta (game), an Indonesian strategy board game for two players, named after the ancient city of Surakarta in central Java. The game features an unusual method of capture which is unique and not known in any other board game.

== Clothing and fashion ==
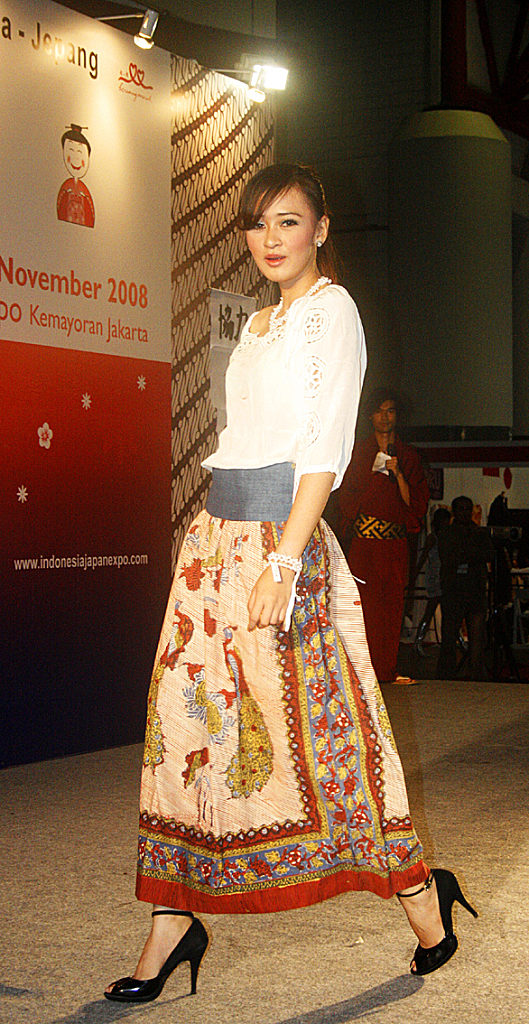
Contemporary batik fashion in Indonesia

- Batik, is a technique of wax-resist dyeing applied to whole cloth, often uses canting as a tool to apply liquid hot wax to create motifs. Although similar wax-resist technique are found in several countries, the batik of Indonesia, however, may be the best-known.
- Songket, is a hand-woven in silk or cotton, and intricately patterned with gold or silver threads. Indonesia perhaps has the richest tradition of this brocade weaving art.
- Ikat, is a dyeing technique used to pattern textiles that employs resist dyeing on the yarns prior to dyeing and weaving the fabric. The ikat tradition is especially prevalent in Central and Eastern Indonesia, especially in Sumba, Flores, and Timor islands.
- Tapis, a traditional weaving style from Lampung, Indonesia. The word tapis also refers to the resulting cloth. It consists of a striped, naturally coloured cloth embroidered with warped and couched gold thread.
- Ulos, a traditionally hand-woven cotton fabrics, and intricately patterned, specific to Batak tribes of North Sumatra usually slung over the shoulder during traditional occasions.
- Kebaya, a traditional blouse-dress, the national costume of Indonesia, although it is more accurately endemic to the Javanese, Sundanese, Balinese, and Betawi peoples.
- Sarong, a large tube or length of fabric, often wrapped around the waist.
- Peci, a cap widely worn in Indonesia, Malaysia and Brunei, mostly among Muslim males. in Indonesia the peci can also be associated with the nationalist secular movement.
- Indonesian traditional men headgears, various traditional Indonesian hats, headgears or headdress wore by Indonesian men in traditional settings. Notable examples include Javanese blangkon, Sundanese iket, Acehnese kupiah, Malay tanjak, Madurese odheng, Balinese udeng, and Dayak beluko.

== Construction and civil engineering ==
Prambanan temple of ancient Java, demonstrate the technical mastery of stone masonry in Hindu temple architecture.
- Rumah adat, various indigenous technique of carpentry, wood carving and stone masonry employed in constructing traditional houses of vernacular Indonesian architecture. Notable example includes tongkonan, rumah gadang, omo sebua, joglo and pura.
- Candi, stone temple architecture developed in ancient Java circa 7th or 8th century. It employs an intricate system of interlocked stone masonry, knobs, indentations and dovetails, and corbelling method.
- Sosrobahu, a road and bridge construction technique which twist the concrete beam shoulder of the supporting pylon, which allows long stretches of flyovers to be constructed above existing main roads with a minimum of disruption to the traffic, designed by Tjokorda Raka Sukawati.
- Cakar ayam construction, or literally means "chicken claw construction" is a technical engineering to create a more stable foundation by employing concrete plate supported by pipes planted deep into the ground acted as "claws", invented by Prof. Dr. Ir. Sedijatmo in 1961. The technique is applied on structures, roads and runways. The technical principle consist of a concrete plate foundation is supported and secured to the ground by pipes as "claws", which allowed a more stable construction, enable to build structure on soft wet ground such as on swamps. The technique allowed the structure to be more rigid, stable and more durable against uneven weight distribution or uneven land declining.
- Bagan, a fishing instrument (lift net) for light fishing, originating from Indonesia. There are 5 type: Stationary bagan, raft bagan, boat bagan, boat bagan with platform, and sail bagan.
- Jengki style, a post-war modernist architectural style that became popular around late 1950s and early 1960s. Jengki style reflected the new influence of the United States on Indonesian architecture, and can be interpreted as a tropical interpretation of American post-war modernist suburb houses. Jengki style made use of unusual shapes, such as pentagons, and sharp bold angles. Asymmetrical roofs and facades, playful cut-out doors and windows, and oddly tilted roofs and eaves were imbued with a spirit of cheerfulness and freedom.

== Economy ==
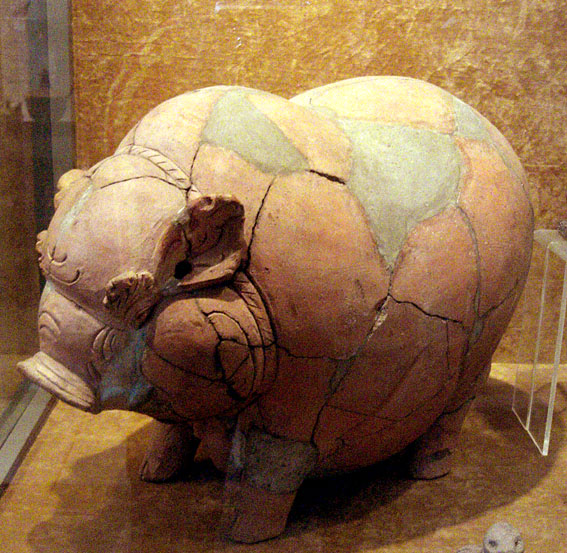
Majapahit terracotta piggy bank, 14th/15th century Trowulan, East Java. (Collection of National Museum of Indonesia, Jakarta)

- Arisan, a form of Rotating Savings and Credit Association in Indonesian culture, a form of Microfinance.
- Piggy bank, known as celengan (Note: A cèlèng is a wild boar, with the "an" affix used to denote a likeness) in Indonesian, it is a boar-shaped terracotta figurine with a slit hole used to insert, collect and store coins. Despite piggy banks being a result of parallel development in several places around the world, one of the oldest manifestation of pig-shaped money box is dated from Majapahit period, in Java circa 14th century.
- Warung, a type of small Indonesian family-owned business — often a casual shop, a modest small restaurant or café. There are many kinds of warung, some take the form of a small shop that sells cold bottled drinks, candy, cigarettes, snacks, kue, krupuk and other daily necessities, while the larger ones are small restaurant establishments.

== Food processing and cuisine ==
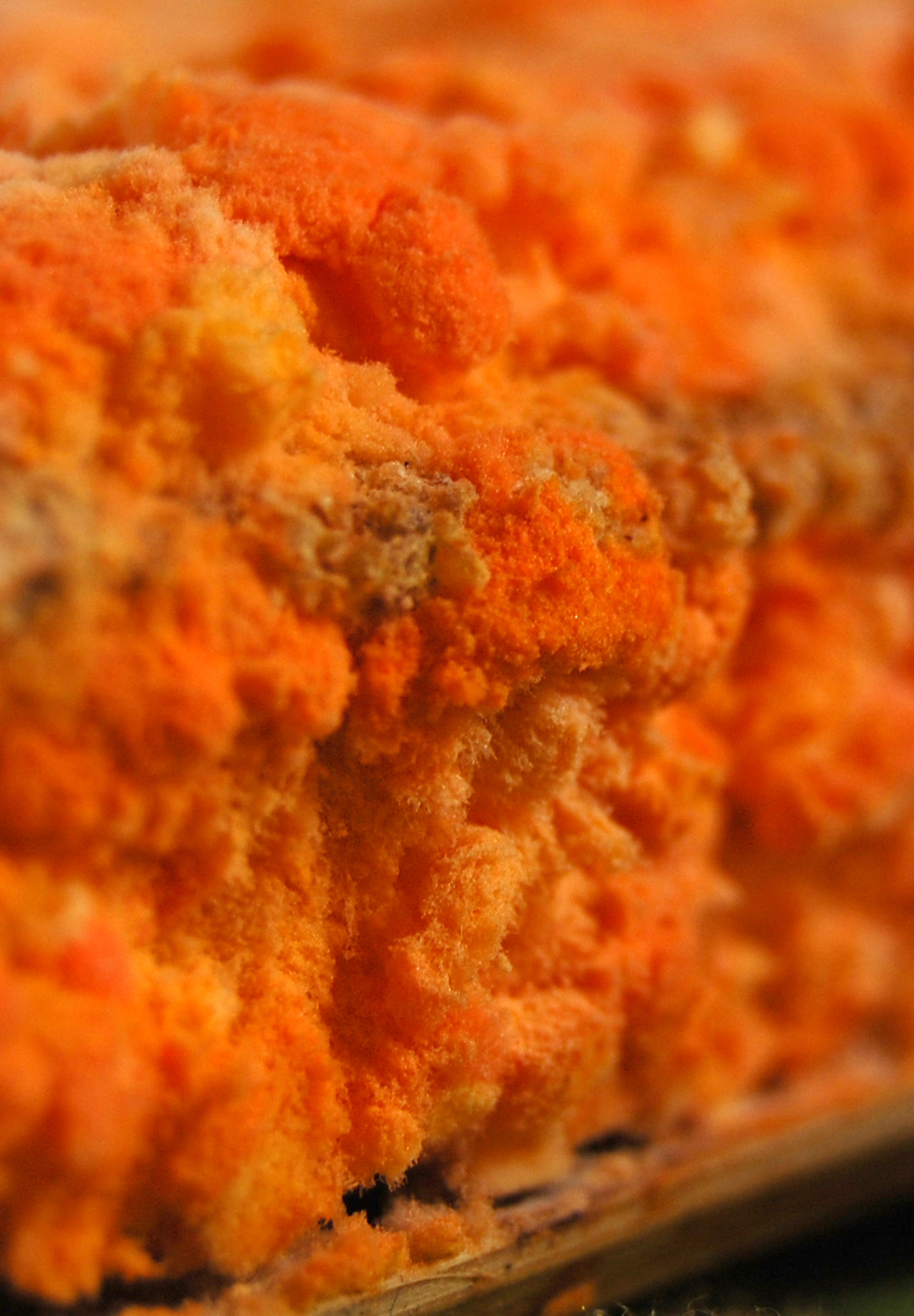
Detail of bright-colored oncom mold, Neurospora intermedia.

- Tempeh, fermented soybean cake made by growing whitish Rhizopus oligosporus fungi. The fermentation technique is native to Java.
- Oncom, fermented by-product of soybean or peanuts tailings (tofu dregs), which growing mold of Rhizopus oligosporus or Neurospora intermedia var. oncomensis. The fermentation technique is native to West Java.
- Tapai, fermented sweet and sour tasting food usually made either from rice or cassava, commonly found in Indonesia.
- Rendang, slow cooked spicy meat dish, usually beef cooked with complex mixture of spices and coconut milk. Specialty of Minangkabau ethnic group of West Sumatra. The spices, garlic, shallot, ginger, and galangal used in rendang have antimicrobial properties and serve as natural organic preservatives.
- Pindang, Indonesian traditional method to preserve food by boiling the ingredients in salt together with certain spices that contains tannin.
- Bumbu, Indonesian blend of spices and it commonly appears in the names of spice mixtures, sauces and seasoning pastes.
- Brem, traditional Indonesian fermented food or fermented beverage. There are two types of brem, brem cake (solid) that is usually eaten as snack from Madiun and Wonogiri, and brem beverage (liquid) made of rice wine from Bali. Brem appeared in Java circa 1000 CE.
- Tuak, traditional alcoholic beverage made from the sap of various species of palm tree such as the palmyra, date palms and coconut palms.
- Kue, Indonesian bite-sized snack or dessert food. Kue is a fairly broad term in Indonesian to describe a wide variety of snacks; cakes, cookies, fritters, pies, scones, and patisserie.
- Sambal, Indonesian hot and spicy sauce typically made from a mixture of a variety of chili peppers with secondary ingredients such as shrimp paste, tomato, garlic, ginger, shallot, scallion, palm sugar and lime juice. It is an essential condiment in Indonesian cuisine.
- Sweet soy sauce, Indonesian sweetened aromatic soy sauce, which has a dark colour, a thick syrupy molasses-like consistency due to the generous addition of palm sugar.
- Various iced dessert, various dessert recipe of shaved ice with fruits, coconut milk and palm sugar. Notable example include cendol, es teler, es campur, es doger and es kelapa muda.
- Coconut rice, various recipes of rice cooked with coconut. Notable example include nasi uduk, nasi liwet, nasi gurih, burasa, nasi kuning and tumpeng.
- Banana leaf cooking, cooking methods employing package of banana leaf or coconut fronds. Specific recipes including pepes, botok, lemper, lontong and ketupat.
- Dry instant noodle, although ramen instant noodle were developed and invented by Japanese, Indonesian invented its dry or soupless version, Indomie Mi goreng, which omit its soup and mixed with vegetable oil and Indonesian sweet soy sauce.
- Teh botol, bottled sweetened jasmine tea drink served cold, introduced in Indonesia in the 1970s.

== Literature ==
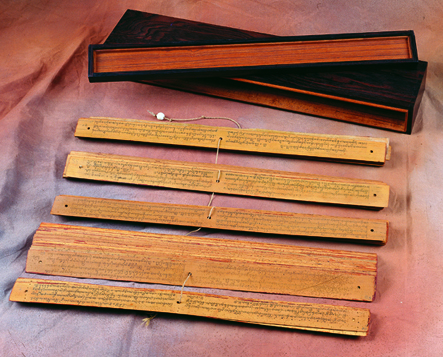
Nagarakretagama palm-leaf manuscript.

- Indonesian scripts, various indigenous or foreign derivation of script, writing systems and alphabet traditions developed in Indonesian Archipelago. Notable examples include Kawi, Javanese, Balinese, Sundanese, Rencong, Batak, Rejang, Bonda, Lontara, Pegon, and Jawi scripts.
- Undang-Undang Laut Melaka, a legal code of the Malacca Sultanate. It was composed by a group of Malaccan shipowners, most of whom were Javanese in origin.
- La Galigo, an epic creation myth of the Bugis from South Sulawesi.
- Kakawin, a tradition of Kawi Old Javanese poetic literature, mostly developed in Medang Mataram, Kediri, to Majapahit period circa 10th to 15th century Java. Notable examples include Kakawin Ramayana, Kakawin Bhāratayuddha, Kakawin Arjunawiwaha, Kakawin Hariwangsa and Kakawin Sutasoma.
- Panji, a compilation of tales about a legendary 12th century prince of East Java. His life formed the basis of a cycle of Javanese stories, that are the basis of various poems and a genre of wayang and topeng masked dance. Panji tales have spread from East Java to be a fertile source for literature and drama throughout Southeast Asia, including Indonesia, Malaysia, Thailand and Cambodia.
- Nagarakretagama, also known as Desawarnana, is an Old Javanese eulogy to Hayam Wuruk, a Javanese king of the Majapahit Empire. It was written on lontar as a kakawin by Mpu Prapanca in 1365 (1287 Saka year).
- Pararaton, also known as the Book of Kings, is a Javanese chronicle in the Kawi language. The comparatively short text of 32 folio-size pages (1,126 lines) contains the history of the kings of Singhasari and Majapahit in eastern Java.
- Bujangga Manik, an Old Sundanese literature dated from circa late 15th century to early 16th century. It is a travelogue of Prince Jaya Pakuan alias Bujangga Manik, throughout Java and Bali. He was a Sundanese Hindu rishi, though a prince at the court of Pakuan Pajajaran.
- Sanghyang Siksa Kandang Karesian, literally the title means the book of rules with guidance to be a resi (wise or holy man). A Sundanese didactic manuscript dated from the early 16th century, mostly contains moral and spiritual lessons in Hindu Sundanese tradition.
- Serat Centhini, a compilation of Javanese tales and teachings, written in verse and published in 1814, commissioned by Crown Prince Mangkunegoro (later enthroned as Pakubuwono V of Surakarta).
- Dongeng (Indonesian folklore), a collection of Indonesian traditional tales, folklore and legends that used to teach morality for children. Notable example includes Lutung Kasarung, Bawang Merah Bawang Putih, Leungli, Sangkuriang, Timun Mas, Roro Jonggrang, Kancil Story, and Malin Kundang.

== Medicine, health and biology ==
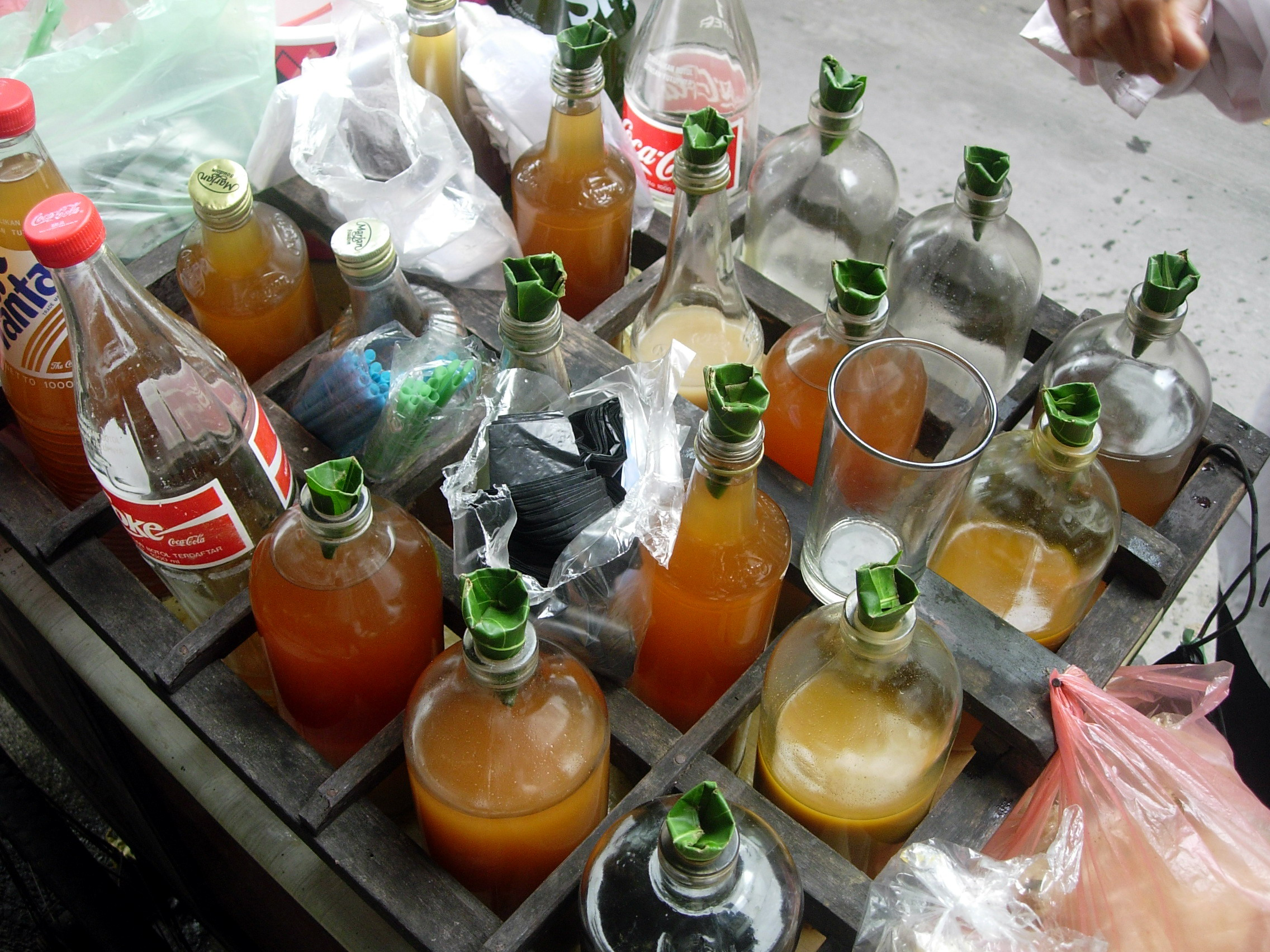
Traditional herbal jamu in bottles.

- Chromosome 23 pair, recognized by Joe Hin Tjio.
- Jamu, Indonesian traditional herbal medicine indigenous to Java.
- Lulur, Javanese topical herbal lotion applied upon skin believed to enhance smoothness and beauty. It is commonly practiced and offered as one of spa treatment in Indonesia.
- Kerokan, is a traditional Javanese medical treatment in which the skin is scraped to produce red-colored light bruising. Practitioners believe kerokan releases unhealthy elements from injured areas and stimulates blood flow and healing. It is believed that the practice derived from Chinese Gua sha.
- Puskesmas, (Pusat Kesehatan Masyarakat) are government-mandated community health clinics located across Indonesia. It improves the health quality of common Indonesian people by extend the reach of health service, promoting hygiene and sanitation, family planning, maternal health on childbirth, also infants immunization.
- Oxford–AstraZeneca COVID-19 vaccine, developed by Jenner Institute, whose senior research scientist is Carina Joe. She is one of the vaccine patent holders, by virtue of being lead scientist in process development for large scale cGMP manufacturing.

== Philosophy, ideology, politics and social sciences ==
Symbols of Pancasila

- Pancasila, the official, foundational philosophical theory of the Indonesian state. This pluralist political stance was meant as a compromise to provide the moderate middleground among ideological-political spectrums — between leftist socialist and rightist nationalist religious (esp. Islamic element).
- Marhaenism, a socialistic political ideology developed by the first President of Indonesia, Sukarno.
- Nasakom, a political concept during the Sukarno presidency in Indonesia. It is an acronym based on the Indonesian words NASionalisme ('nationalism'), Agama ('religion'), and KOMunisme ('communism').
- Gotong royong, or "working together", a concept of indigenous communal work derived from traditional Indonesian community.
- Islam Nusantara, a distinctive brand of empirical Islam developed in the Indonesian Archipelago since the 16th century. The main traits of Islam Nusantara are tawasut (moderate), rahmah (compassionate), anti-radical, inclusive and tolerant. Islam Nusantara is a result of interaction, contextualization, indigenization, interpretation and vernacularization of universal Islamic values, according to socio-cultural reality of Indonesia. The term was proposed and promoted by Indonesian Islamic organization Nahdlatul Ulama, as an alternative for interpretation on global Islam that mainly dominated by Arabic or Middle Eastern perspectives.
- Shiva-Buddha, a syncretic Hindu-Buddhist religious doctrine developed in ancient Java during the Singhasari and Majapahit period (13th to 15th century). The doctrine advocate for the oneness of dharma and promote religious tolerance between Shivaist and Buddhist in ancient Java. Notable literary work including Sutasoma, written by Tantular circa late 14th century. The Candi Jawi is an example of Shiva-Buddha syncretic temple.

== Sports ==
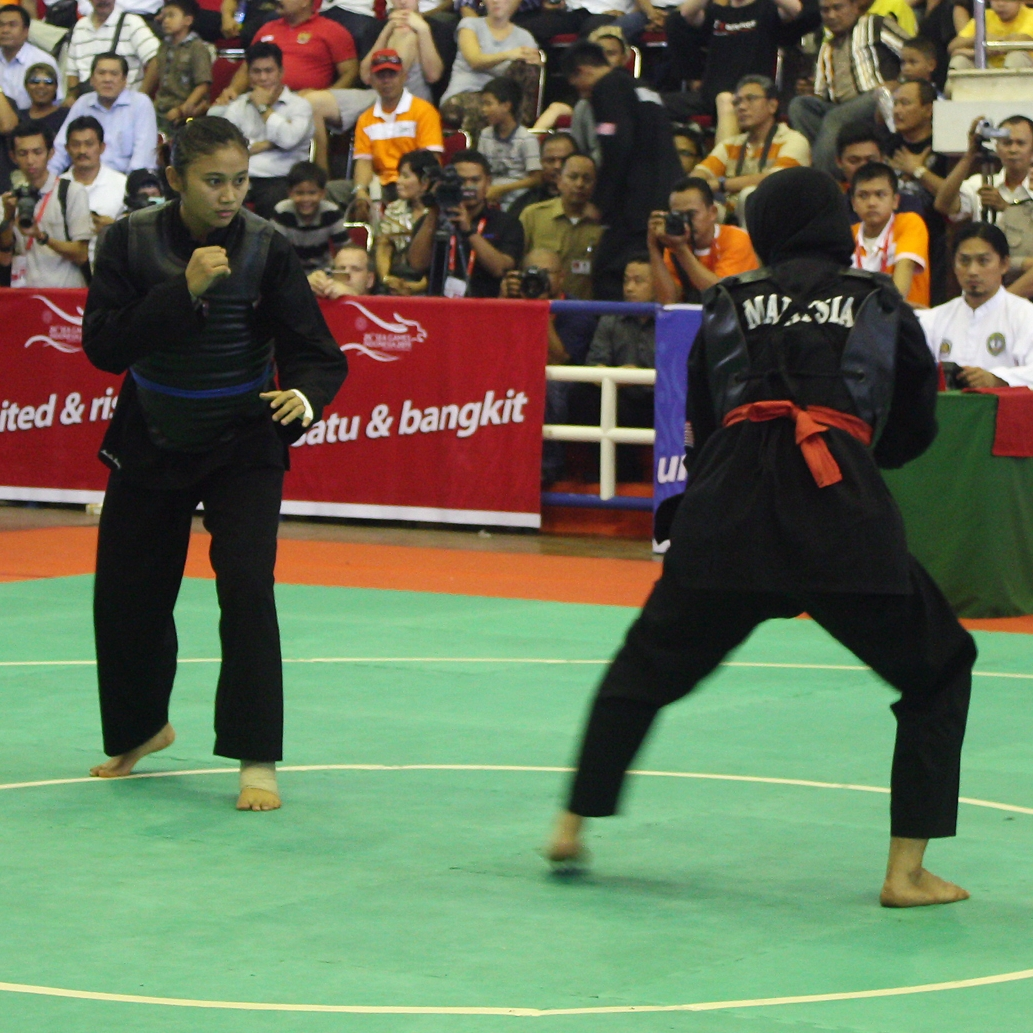
Pencak silat tournament in SEA Games XXVI.

- Pencak Silat, a class of related traditional Indonesian martial arts. It is a full-body fighting form incorporating strikes, grappling and throwing in addition to weaponry. Every part of the body is used and subject to attack. Pencak silat was practiced not only for physical defense but also for psychological ends.
- Tarung Derajat, a full body contact hybrid martial art from West Java, Indonesia, created by Haji Achmad Dradjat. He developed the techniques through his experience as a street fighter during the 1960s in Bandung. Tarung Derajat is officially recognized as a national sport and used as a basic martial art training for the Indonesian Armed Forces and Indonesian National Police.
- Pacu Jalur, a traditional race of rowing prahus, sampans, or canoes made from whole logs which are shaped into a typical Rantau Kuantan boat which originates from Kuantan Singingi in Riau. This event is held every year on the river of Batang Kuantan under the series of events of the Pacu Jalur Festival, which is the biggest annual festival for the local community (especially in Teluk Kuantan) for hundreds of years.
- Indonesian animal racing, various animal racing in Indonesia are notably for ethnic cultural purpose and traditional sport, while contesting animal such as cow, buffalo, goat, horse, boar, duck, pigeon, and rabbit. Famous examples include karapan sapi, pacu jawi, pacu itiak.

== Technology, information, physics ==
- QRIS (Quick Response Indonesia Standard) is a payment system developed by Bank Indonesia (BI) and the Indonesian Payment System Association (ASPI), enabling peer-to-peer transactions between banks and person-to-merchant payments using any smartphone with a QR code scanner as well as devices with near field communication (NFC).
- Gojek, an Indonesian hyperlocal transport, logistics and payments unicorn startup founded in 2010.
- Tokopedia, Indonesia's biggest online marketplaces unicorn startup, launched in 2009.
- Dual Fast Fourier transform applied in 4G LTE technology, discovered by Khoirul Anwar.
- Abbreviated Epitaxial Growth Mode (AGM), method for reducing cost and improving quality of LEDs and lasers, patented by Nelson Tansu.

== Transportation ==
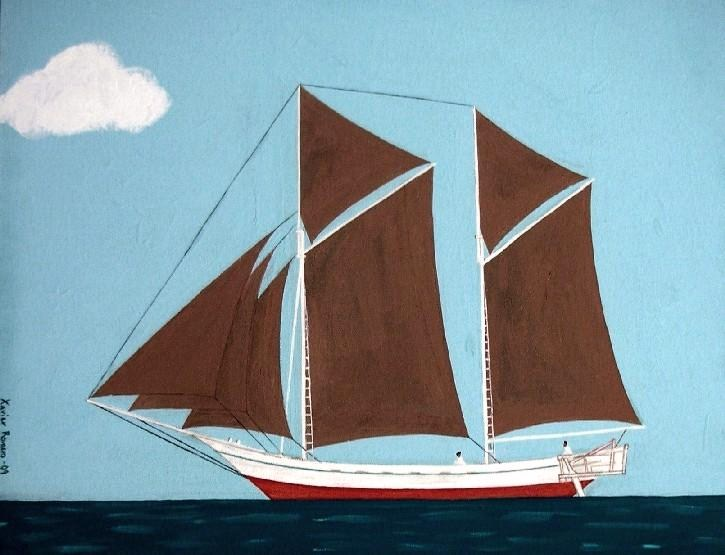
Painting of a pinisi-rigged ship.

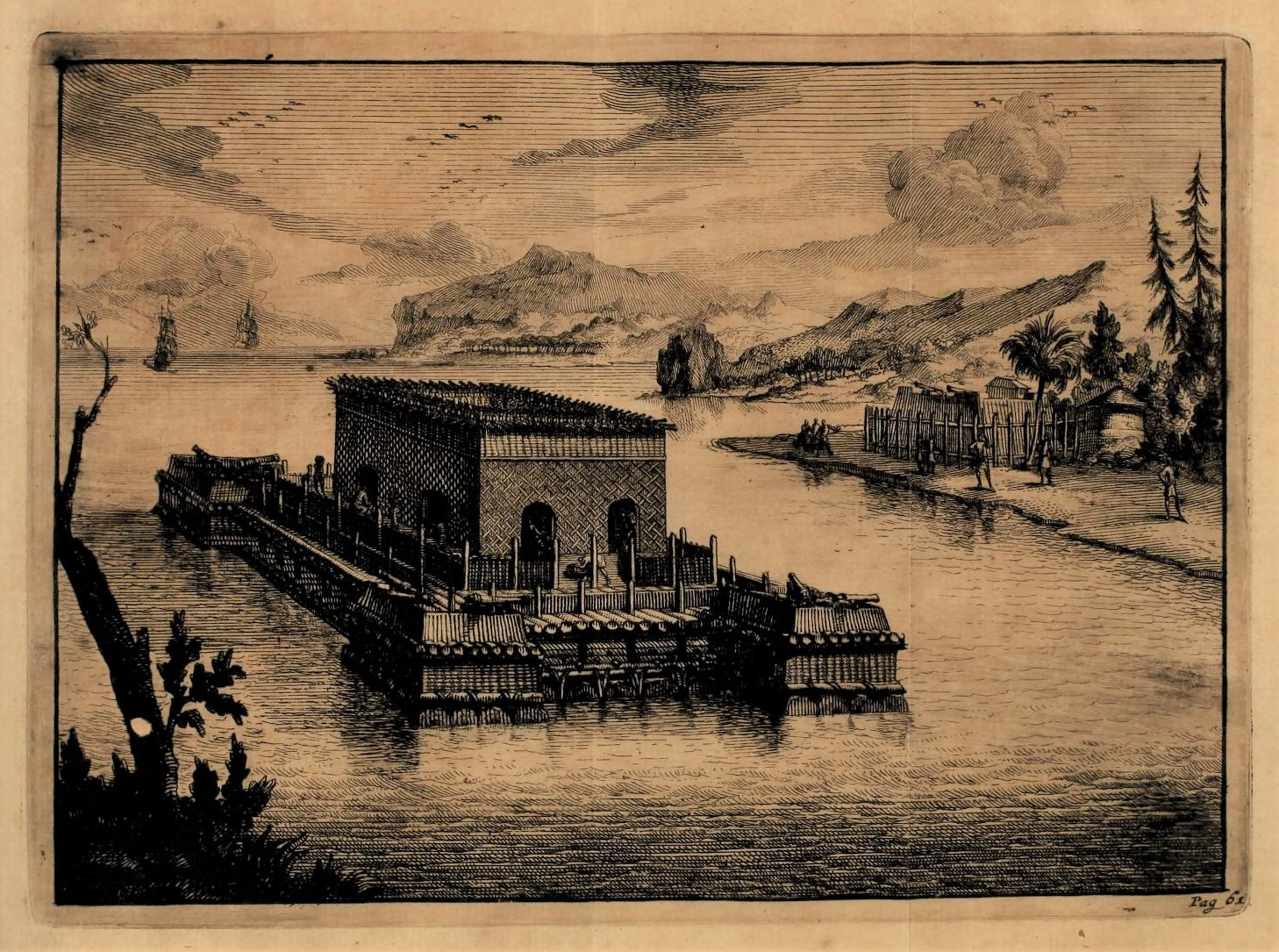
A floating water castle, or kotta mara.
- Tanja sail, a type of sail commonly used by Austronesian peoples.
- Junk rig, invention of Austronesian people several hundred B.C.E., adopted by the Chinese as their main type of sail.
- Lug sail, a type of sail and one of the earliest fore-and-aft rigs.
- Pinisi rig, two-masted rigging of ships used widely by the Buginese and Makassarese, mostly for inter-insular transportation, cargo and fishing purposes within Indonesian Archipelago.
- Perahu, a type of traditional sailboat with outrigger, and is most numerous in the various islands of Indonesia.
- Sandeq, a traditional Indonesian sailing ship with outrigger and triangular sail, used widely by the Mandar of West Sulawesi, mostly for fishing.
- Junk, sailing ship that used widely in Asia. Although it is associated with China, Pierre-Yves Manguin and Zoetmulder points to a probable Old Javanese origin.
- Javanese Jong, a large type of junk particularly made in Java and Kalimantan.
- Penjajap, fast rowing and sailing-type ship from Nusantara.
- Kora-kora, a type of oared ship used prominently in the western part of the archipelago.
- Kakap, small coasting boat that's usually act as scout for Penjajap.
- Lancaran, a type of galley-like vessel commonly used in Sumatra and Java.
- Kelulus, type of perahu used in commerce and warfare.
- Borobudur ship, the 8th-century wooden double outrigger, sailed vessel of Maritime Southeast Asia depicted in some bas reliefs of the Borobudur Buddhist monument in Central Java, Indonesia.
- Kotta mara, floating battery of Banjar and Dayak people
- Padewakang, predecessor of pinisi
- Pencalang, Malay ship used for scouting
- Chialoup, a type of trading ship, a result of Western an Nusantaran technique
- Toop, main Nusantaran merchant vessel of 18–19th century
- Mayang (boat), traditional Javanese fishing boat
- Patorani, flying fish catcher boat
- Lancang (ship), ship from the east coast of Sumatra
- Londe, traditional boat from North Sulawesi
- Benawa, type of ship from Gowa
- Jongkong, type of dugout canoe from Maritime Southeast Asia
- Malangbang, medieval sailing ship from Indonesia
- Tongkang, Southeast Asian ship
- Pelang, traditional boat from Indonesia and Malaysia
- Ghali, several types of galley-like ships from the Indonesian Archipelago
- Ghurab, galley-like merchant and warship from the Indonesian Archipelago
- Kalulis, traditional boat from eastern Indonesia
- Lepa-lepa (dugout canoe), traditional canoe from the eastern part of the Indonesian Archipelago
- Knabat bogolu, war vessel from Mentawai islands
- Orembai, plank boat from the Maluku Islands
- Jukung tambangan, traditional boat made by the Banjar people of South Kalimantan
- Bajak, sailing prahu of the Dayak people of Borneo
- Bangkong, war boat of dayak people
- Golekan, traditional boat from Madura
- Janggolan, two different type of perahu from Indonesia.
- Jellore, traditional Sumatran sailing craft
- Lambo, two types of traditional boats from Indonesia
- Leti leti, traditional transport vessel from East Madura
- Lis-alis, traditional boat of Madura, Indonesia
- Palari, Indonesian sailing vessel from South Sulawesi
- Sampan panjang, type of Malay fast boat from the 19th century
- Bago (boat), traditional boat built by the Mandar people of Sulawesi
- Paduwang, traditional double-outrigger vessel from Madura
- Pajala (boat), traditional perahu from western South Sulawesi
- Solu, traditional boat of Toba Batak people
- CN-235, a medium-range twin-engined transport aircraft that was jointly developed by Construcciones Aeronáuticas SA (CASA) of Spain and Indonesian manufacturer IPTN, as a regional airliner and military transport.
- N-219, a twin-engine, 19-seater transport aircraft designed by Indonesian Aerospace for multi-purpose missions in remote areas.
- N-245, a 50-seat commercial turboprop aircraft, an original design by the Indonesian firm Indonesian Aerospace.
- PT INKA rail products, multiple rail products made by Indonesian train manufacturer PT INKA such as Locomotive, Railbus, Light Rail, Battery Tram, and many more. First employed in Palembang LRT in 2018, while its diesel version was exported to the Philippines and employed by PNR in 2019.
- Fin Komodo, buggy-type car made by PT FKT.
- AMMDes, agricultural vehicle produced by PT Kreasi Mandiri Wintor Indonesia.

== Weapons and military ==
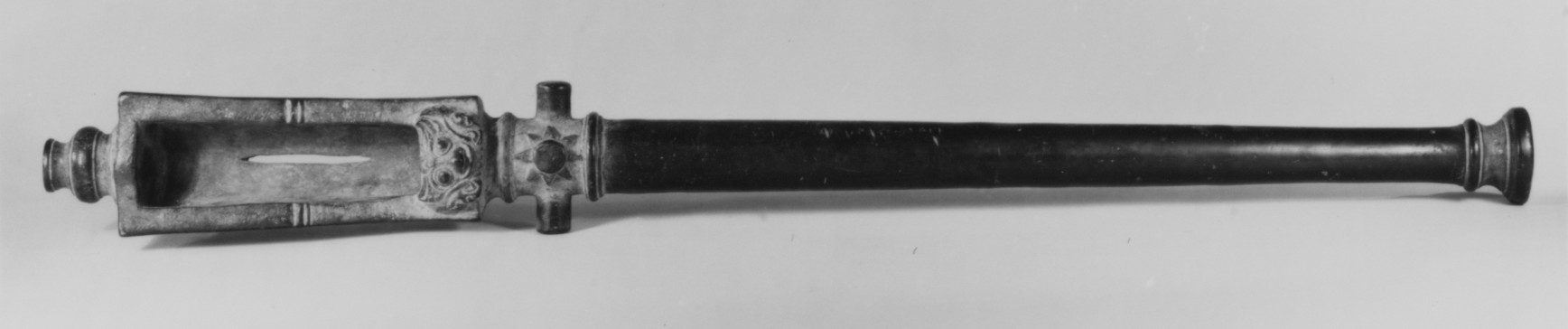
Majapahit Cetbang cannon, collection of Metropolitan Museum of Art, New York.

- Kris, asymmetrical wavy blade indigenous to Indonesia, especially Java island. It has distinctive blade-patterning achieved through alternating laminations of iron and nickelous iron.
- Karambit, a small Indonesian curved knife resembling a claw. In Indonesia mostly associated with Silek Minangkabau (West Sumatran Silat).
- Golok, a blade similar to a machete, that comes in many variations and is found throughout the Indonesian Archipelago.
- Kujang, a blade weapon native to the Sundanese people of western Java.
- Parang, a type of machete or cleaver used across Indonesian Archipelago.
- Celurit, a sickle with a pronounced crescent-blade patterns which curves more than half a circle and a long handle, is widely used for agricultural purposes and also in Pencak Silat.
- Cetbang, refer to 2 types of cannon used by Majapahit Empire (1293–1527 CE) and other kingdoms in the Indonesian Archipelago.
- Lantaka, a type of bronze swivel gun mounted on merchant vessels travelling the waterways of Malay Archipelago. Its use was greatest in precolonial Southeast Asia especially in Indonesia, Malaysia, Brunei and the Philippines.
- Lela, Malay swivel gun larger than rentaka
- Miniature meriam kecil, a very small version of meriam kecil (lela and lantaka), used mainly as currency.
- Apilan and kota mara, structure for mounting cannon found in ships of the Indonesian Archipelago.
- Java arquebus, primitive long arquebus introduced before the arrival of Iberian explorers.
- Bedil tombak, Nusantaran hand cannon
- Baju Empurau, sea dayak war jacket
- Baju Lamina, plate-and-mail armor from Nusantara
- Baju Rantai, chainmail armor from Nusantara
- Baru Lema'a, braided vest armor from Indonesia
- Baru Öröba, traditional armor of the Nias people
- Kawaca, a term referring to war attire in Javanese texts
- Karambalangan, a type of plate armor
- Siping-siping, Javanese scale armor
- Katapu, war cap or helmet used by Dayaks of Borneo
- Paseki, war helmet from Minahasa, North Sulawesi, Indonesia
- Takula tofao, traditional battle helmet from Nias Island
- PT Pindad arm products, a series of armaments produced by an Indonesian state-owned enterprise specialising in military and commercial products.
- Elang Hitam, a medium-altitude long-endurance UAV made by Indonesian Aerospace.
- Harimau Tank, created under the Modern Medium Weight Tank (MMWT) collaborative tank program between Turkish manufacturer FNSS and Indonesian manufacturer Pindad. The tank is named as "Kaplan MT" in Turkey and "Harimau" (Tiger) in Indonesia.

== Miscellaneous ==
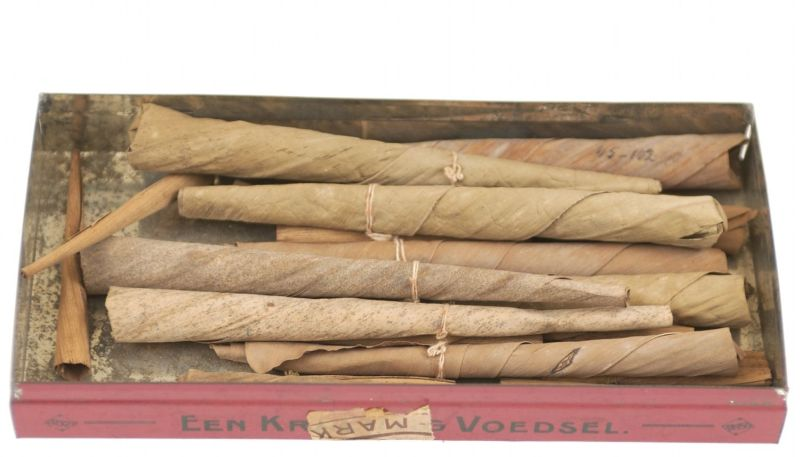
Kreteks from the 1910s, containing resin, nutmeg, cumin, clove, and tobacco wrapped in banana leaves.

- Fire piston, a device traditionally made of bamboo, wood, metal, ivory, bone, and horn. It is used to start a fire using the principle of rapid adiabatic compression of gas to increase the temperature of the gas and set tinder alight, the mechanism of which inspired the invention of the diesel engine by Rudolf Diesel. Fire pistons can be found in other surrounding regions, such as Madagascar, the Malay Peninsula, the Philippines, Burma, Thailand, Laos, parts of Yunnan, and parts of Japan. While in Indonesia, they can be found in Java, Sumatra, Borneo, and the Nusa Tenggara Islands.
- Subak, the paddy fields irrigation system of Bali, which includes water temples, rice terraces, and a whole ecological and socio-cultural aspects of traditional Balinese agricultural community.
- Kretek, is an aromatic cigarette made with a blend of tobacco, cloves and other flavors. This Indonesian cigarette was developed in 19th century Central Java. The word "kretek" itself is an onomatopoetic term for the crackling sound of burning cloves.
- Penile insertions, is an insertion or implant of objects into the penis skin fold. The objects might be metal ball bearings, semi-precious stones, to gold balls or bars. The purpose either as a tool to enhance sexual pleasure for sexual partner, or as amulets. Historically the practice was widely found in Indonesian Archipelago, with oldest archaeological evidence found in sculpture of balled lingam and erect penis of Sukuh temple in Java, dated from Majapahit period.
- Kite, the oldest kite in the world was invented by Muna people in southeast Sulawesi. Dubbed as kaghati, oldest depiction of this kite is from 9,000 B.C., predating Chinese kite by 9,500 years.

== Explorations and discovery ==
- Javanese contact with Australia, contact and intercourse of Javanese people with northern Australia since at least 10th century AD until its discontinuation in early 1600s.
- Makassan contact with Australia, contact and intercourse of Makassar people with northern Australia since at least 17th century AD until its discontinuation in early 1900s.

== See also ==
- Science and technology in Indonesia
- Indonesian Institute of Sciences
- Culture of Indonesia
