= Surakarta (disambiguation) =

Surakarta is a city in Indonesia.

Surakarta may also refer to:

- Surakarta Sunanate, a kingdom in Central Java, Indonesia.
- Special Province of Daerah Istimewa Surakarta, a former province of Indonesia.
- Surakarta (game), Indonesian strategy board game
