= Morion (helmet) =

Spanish 16th century crested helmet

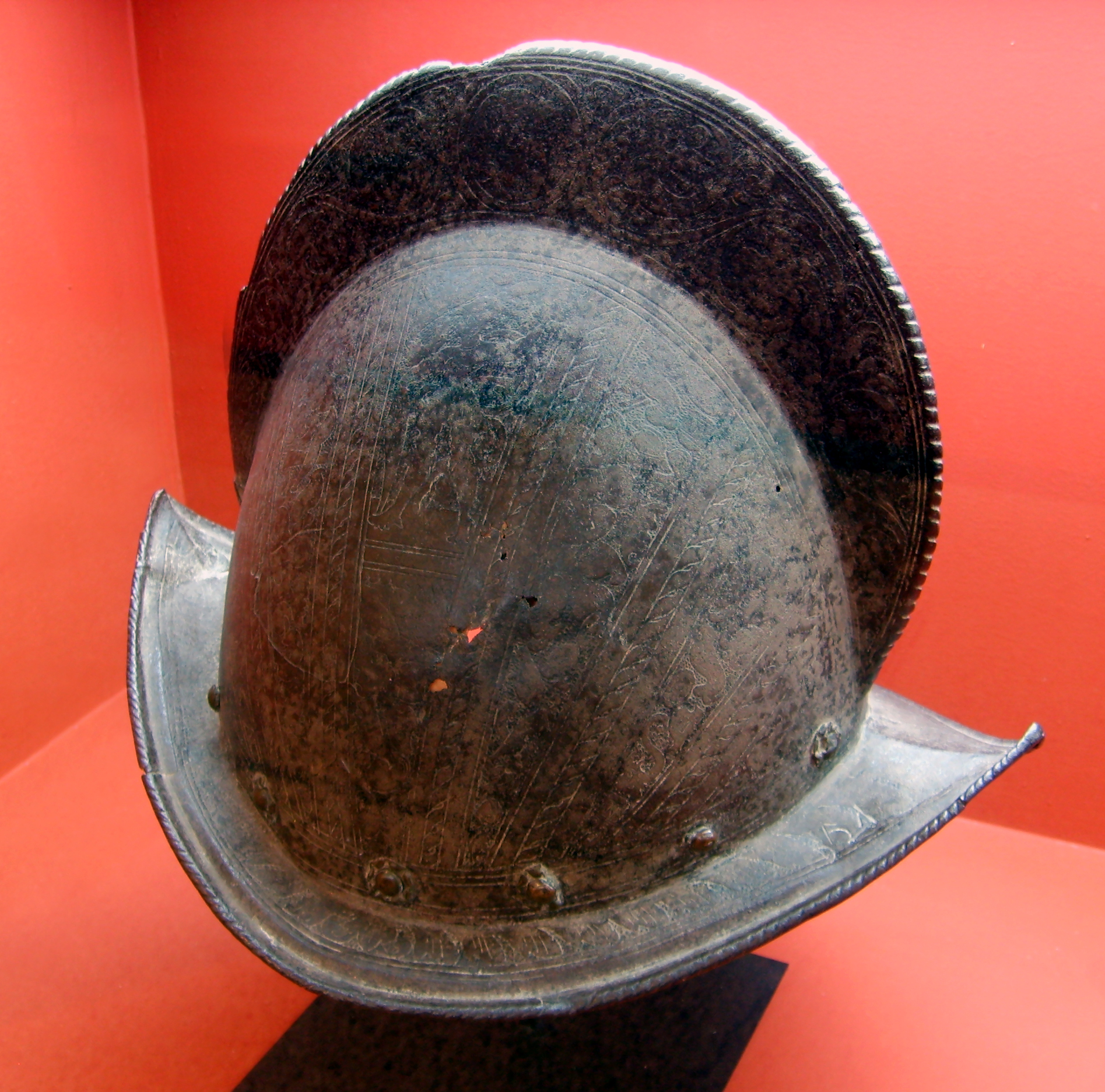
- A Spanish conquistador comb morion (c. 16th century)
- Type: Combat helmet
- Material: Steel
- Place of origin: Spain
- Introduced: early 16th century

A morion (Spanish: morrión) (Catalan: morrió) is a type of open-faced combat helmet originally from Spain, used from the beginning of the 16th century to the early-17th century. The morion usually had a flat brim and a crest running from front to back. Its introduction was contemporaneous with European exploration of the Americas - explorers such as Hernando de Soto and Coronado may have supplied morions to their foot-soldiers in the 1540s.

== History ==
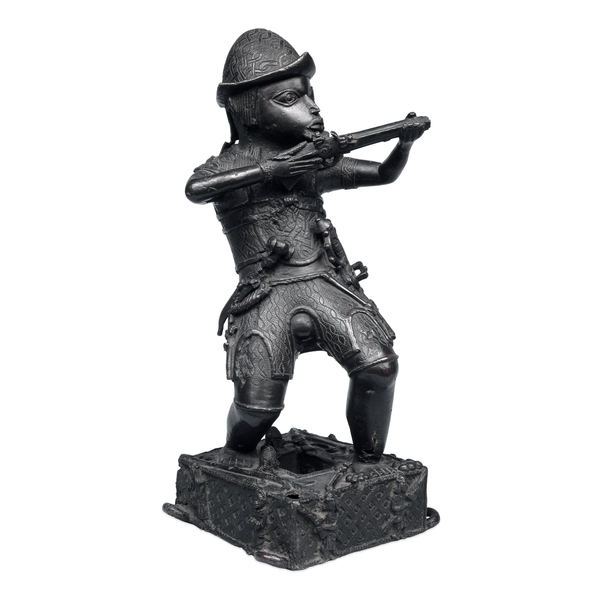
The Benin culture's depiction of a Portuguese musketeer wearing a morion (c. 17th century)

The morion, though popularly identified with early Castilian explorers and conquistadors, was not in use until after the conquest of Mexico by Hernán Cortés or Francisco Pizarro's conquest of the Incas in South America. It was widely used by the Spanish, and thirty to forty years later was also common among foot soldiers of other European nationalities. Low production costs aided its popularity and dissemination, although officers and elite guards would have theirs elaborately engraved to display their wealth and status.

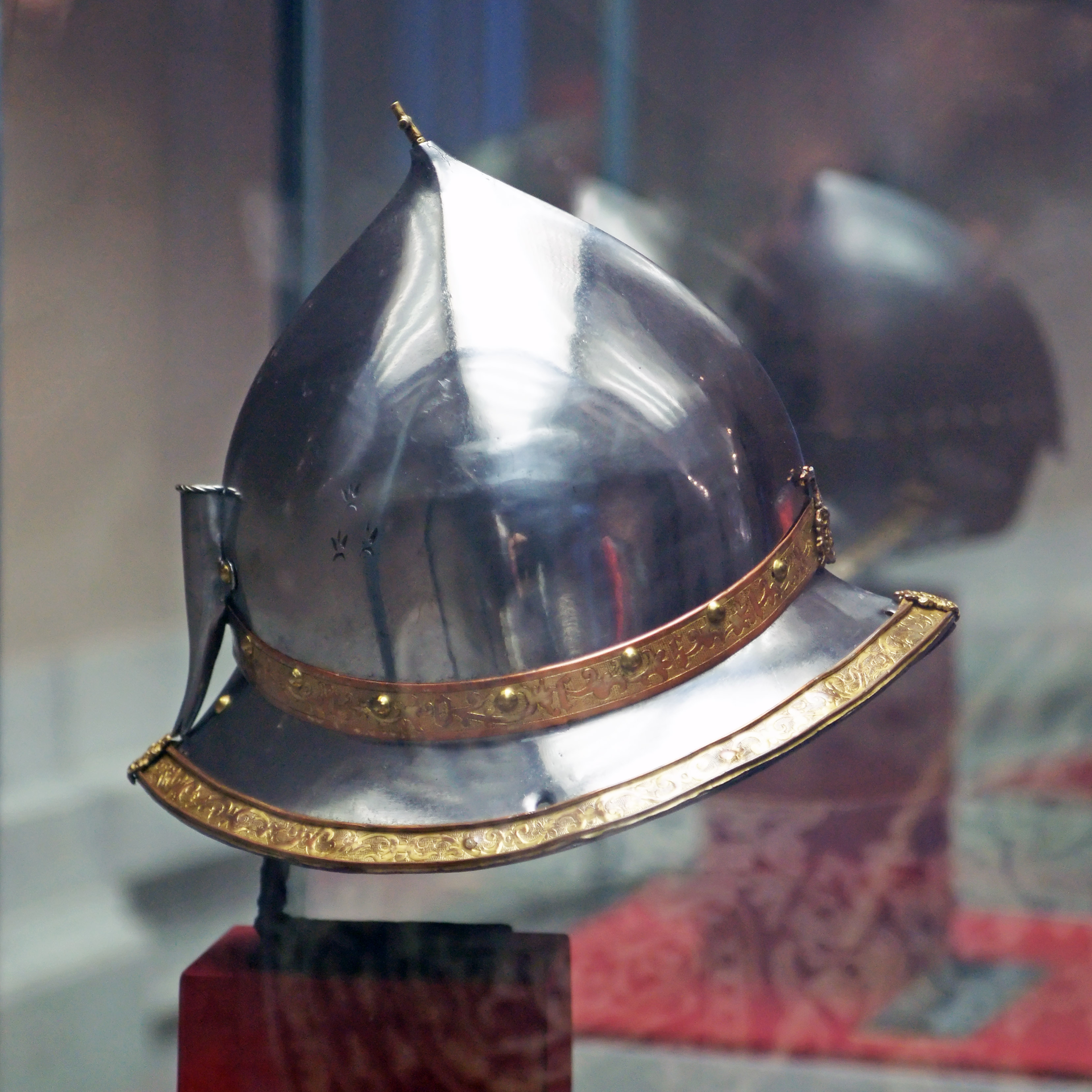
Ferdinand II's kettle hat, c. 1490

The crest or comb on the top of the helmet was designed to strengthen it. Later versions also had cheek guards and even removable faceplates to protect the soldier from sword cuts.

The morion's shape is derived from that of an older helmet, the Spanish kettle hat in 15th century called cabasset. The New Oxford American Dictionary, claims the word derives from the Spanish morrión and morro (round object). The Dictionary of the Spanish Language, published by the Royal Spanish Academy, indicates that the Spanish term for the helmet, morrión, derives from the noun morra, which means "the upper part of the head". It could also derive from morrió in Catalan, which not only designates this type of helmet, but also, among other things, a feedbag, the shape of which resembles a morion when inverted.

In England, this helmet (also known as the pikeman's pot) is associated with the New Model Army, one of the first professional militaries. It was worn by pikemen, together with a breastplate and buff coat as they stood in phalanx-like pike and shot formations, protecting the flanks of the unarmored musketeers.

The similarities in design of some English morions to Italian designs can be attributed to Italian armorers being contracted to produce helmets for the English army.

The helmet provided protection during the push of pike maneuvers known for their high casualty rates. Although mostly issued to Oliver Cromwell's Parliamentarian troops, many Cavaliers wore the morion as well, leading to confusion in battles; soldiers risked being shot by their own allies. It was for this reason that uniforms were introduced to identify armies. First, these were simple colored sashes, but soon the Roundheads introduced red coats, which were retained by the army after the 1660 Restoration of Charles II.

Surviving morions from the 1648 Siege of Colchester have been unearthed and preserved at Colchester Castle along with a lobster tail pot, a helmet associated with Cromwell's heavily armored Ironside cavalry.

Some captured Spanish armor was worn by Native Americans as late as the 19th century as protection from bullets and a sign of their status. The most famous of these was the Comanche chief Iron Jacket who lived in Texas and wore armor that originally belonged to a conquistador.

In the Philippines, the native Moro people adopted the morion and burgonet design for helmets (as well as chainmail and horn coats) during the Spanish–Moro Wars and the Moro Rebellion. The indigenously produced helmets were usually made of iron or brass and elaborately decorated with floral arabesque designs, usually in silver. They had a large visor and neck guard, movable cheek guards, a high crest and three very tall feathered plumes reaching 60 cm (24 in) inserted on the front. These Moro designed versions of the morion can be considered closer in design to the burgonet.

== Cabasset ==
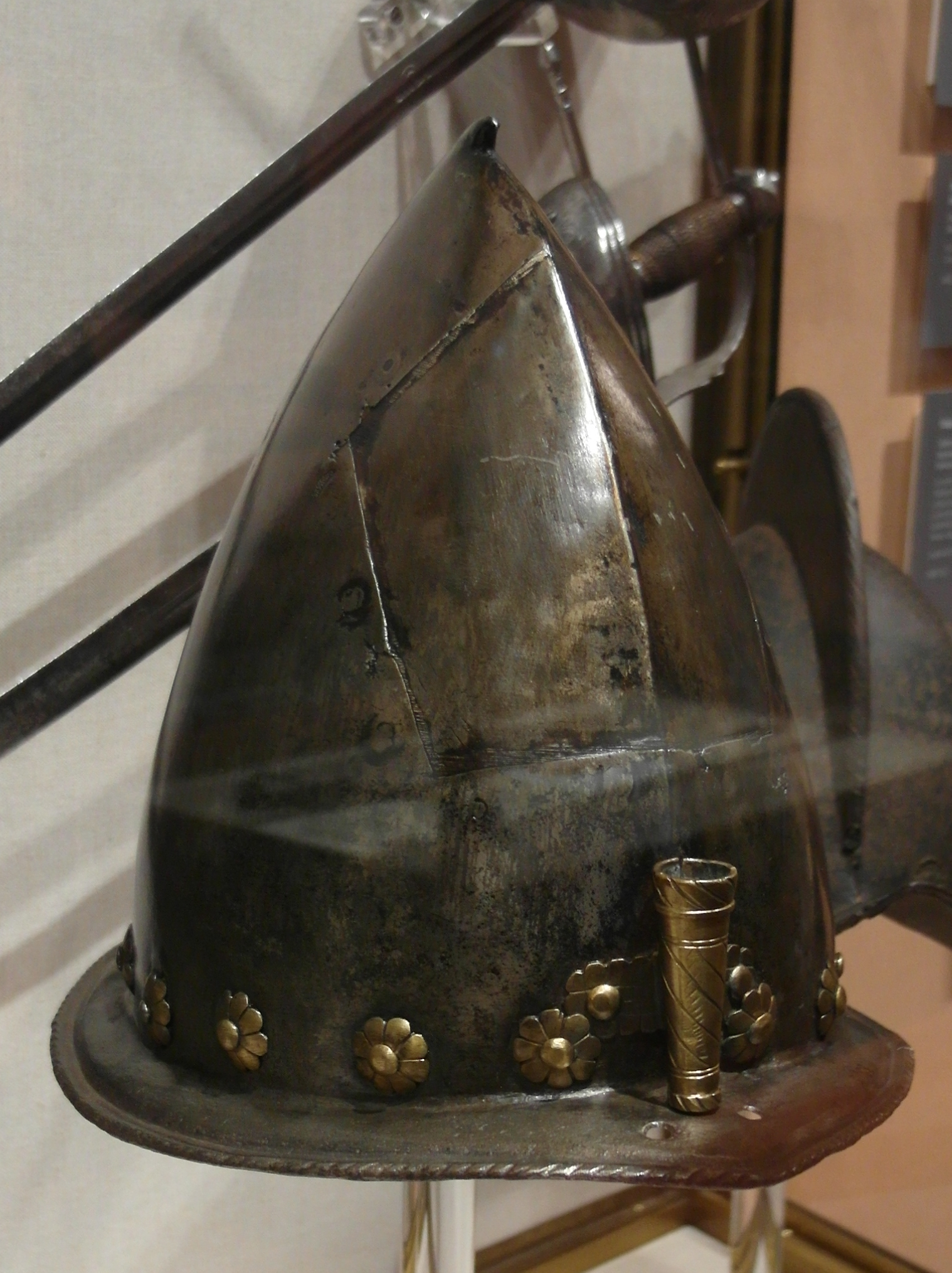
A 1550 Spanish cabasset, somewhat similar to the morion though it lacks the comb and has a taller crown, and is a different shape, Museo Naval de Madrid

A similar helmet, the cabasset (Catalan: cabasset) (Spanish: capacete) was also worn during the 16th century and also originated in Spain, but it is unclear if it predated the morion or was an adaptation of it, with some sources saying it was a more modern helmet. The word has been derived from the Spanish word cabeza (head), while some sources point towards the word "pear" in an Italian dialect, making reference to the stalk-like projection of the helmet, which resembles the fruit. A more likely origin could be the word cabasset in Catalan, meaning a helmet since the early 15th century, originally being a diminutive of cabàs, meaning a sort of basket, though it could as well have derived from cabeça (for head) and its diminutive cabeceta. They were produced mainly in Calatayud, a town in Aragon. Like morions, it was worn by infantry in the pike and shot formations. It was popular in 16th-century England and was used during the Civil War. Several of these helmets were taken to the New World by the Pilgrim fathers, and one of these has been found on Jamestown Island.

== Modern times ==
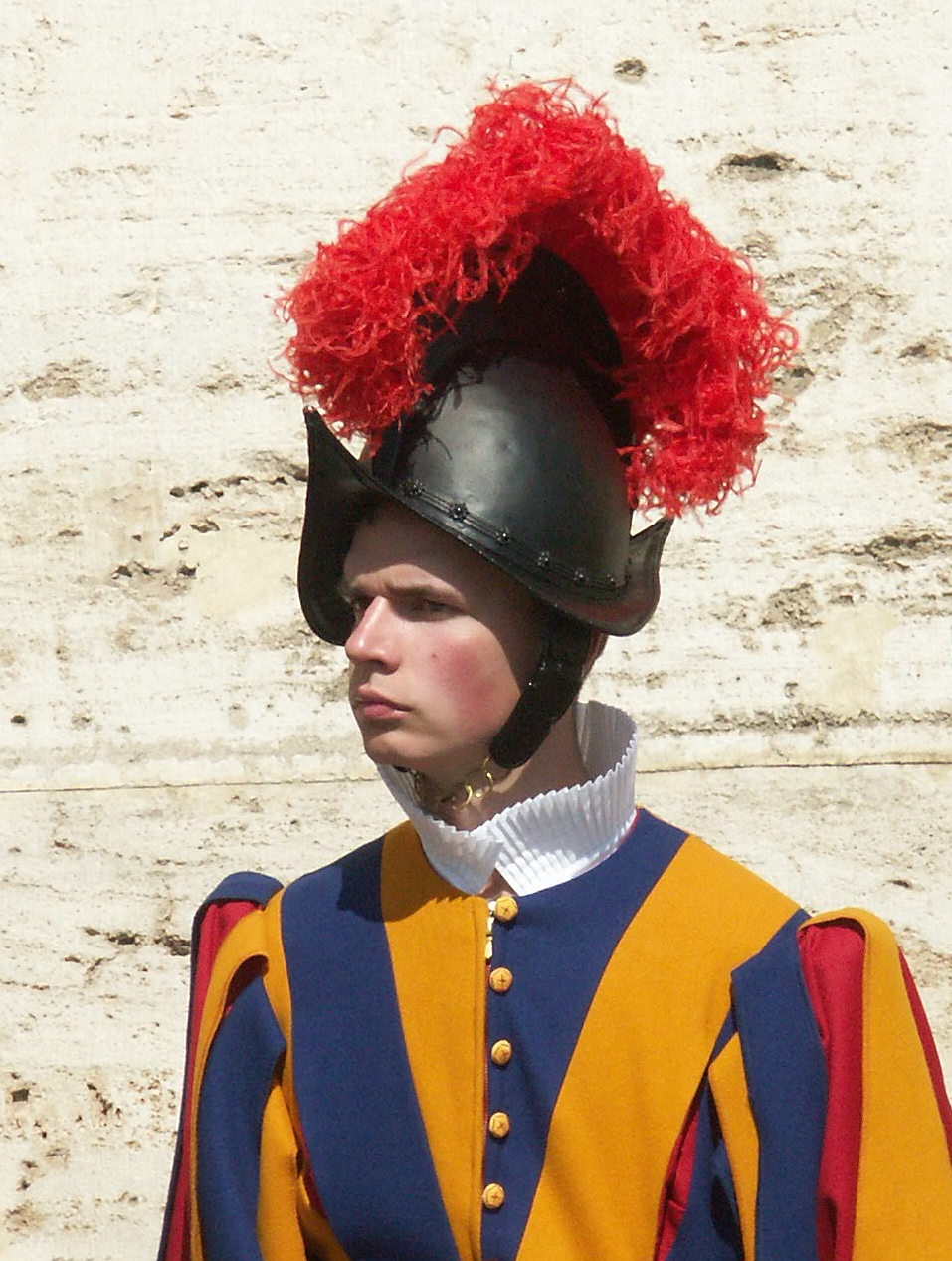
A member of the Swiss Guard with a black morion in the Vatican

- Pith helmets originated when the Spanish adapted the Philippine salakot and shaped it similar to morions or cabassets.
- The morion may have influenced the design of the Adrian helmet issued to French and Italian troops during World War I. Both are of a similar shape and have a comb reinforcing the top of the helmet.
- The comb morion (with a red crest added) is part of the uniform of the Pope's Swiss Guards. A Swiss guardsman in his morion appears on the Vatican City commemorative two-euro coin.
- From 1928 until 1961, the morion served as the logo of automobile manufacturer DeSoto, named after the 16th century explorer Hernando de Soto. It appeared as the hood ornament on cars of the 1940s and 1950s such as the DeSoto Deluxe.
- The seal of the city of Cupertino, California, includes a morion.
- The morion appears on the insignia of the 53rd Infantry Brigade Combat Team, the largest of the Florida Army National Guard, in tribute to the early militias of Florida under Spanish rule.

== See also ==
- Burgonet
- Sallet
- Paseki, a copy of morion from Indonesia
- Pith helmet
