= Katapu =

Indonesian battle-helmet

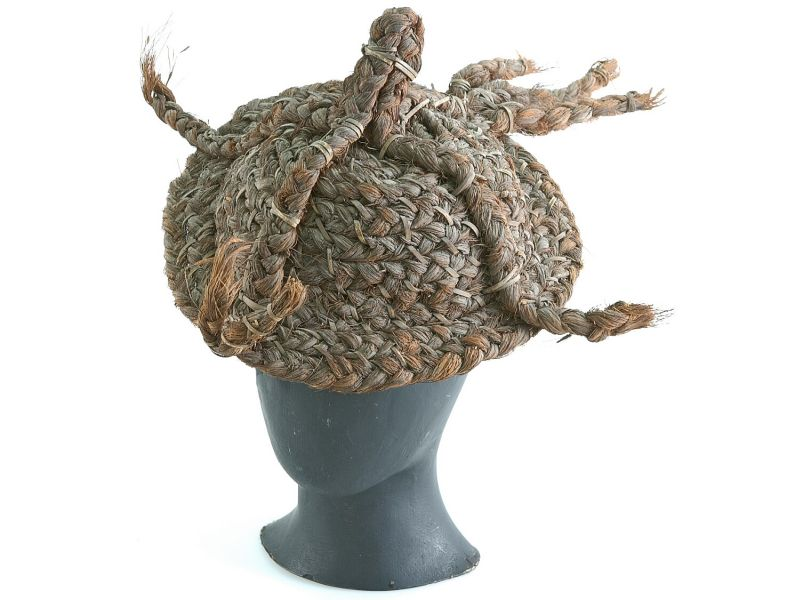
A katapu cap

Katapu or Kalapu is a traditional war cap or helmet used by the Dayaks of Borneo (Indonesia and Malaysia). The katapu is only worn during war.

== Description ==
The Katapu is made of natural materials. It is woven from thick rattan strands that are split lengthways in the middle. It has a sturdy inner helmet that offers protection against sword blows. The helmet is often reinforced with other materials such as metal plates, large fish scales, pangolin scales, and the skins of bears, monkeys, and other animals.

The decorations of the helmets are often designed in the shape of a monster head. Materials used for decoration include wattle, poultry feathers, claws, beaks, skulls of hornbills, human hair, hair of other living things, shells (including the Nassa shell), and the teeth of bears and panthers. Hornbill feathers can also be used a decorative status symbol for warriors who have already fought in war; the feathers can represent the number of enemies killed.

The edge of the helmet can be framed with metal strips or wrapped in red flannel.

Katapu are used not only to protect against wounds, but also to act martially on the battlefield.

== Variants ==
There are different versions of the Katapu throughout Indonesia.

Katapu Kaloi is a Sea Dayak war cap, made by sewing large fish scales on a cap made from a bast-like material.

== Gallery ==
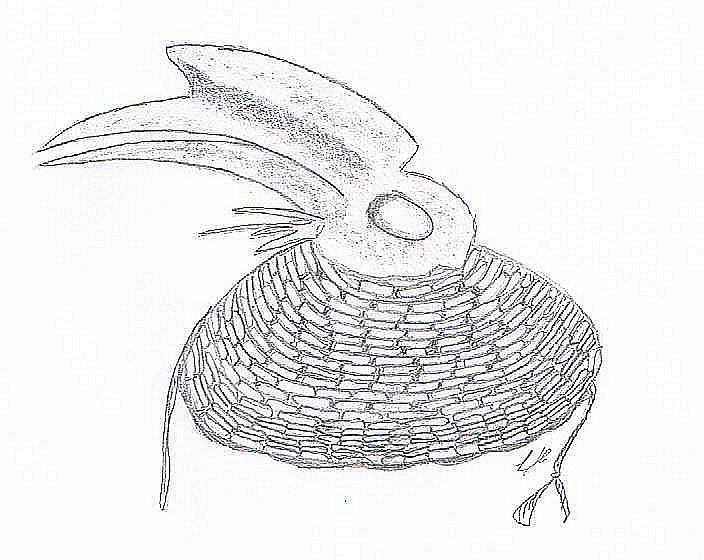
Katapu made of rattan with a hornbill skull

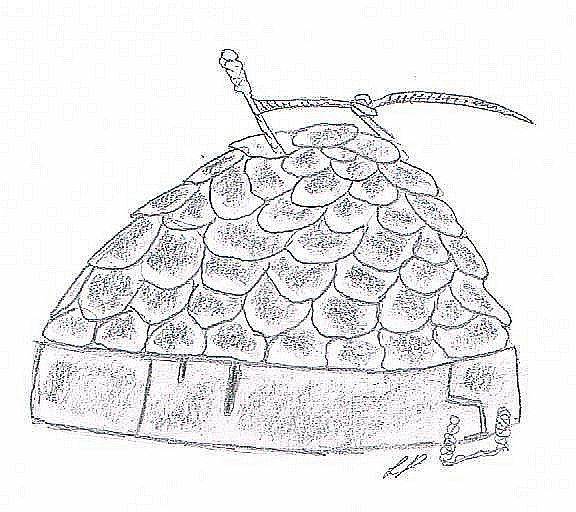
Katapu made of rattan, decorated with fish scales

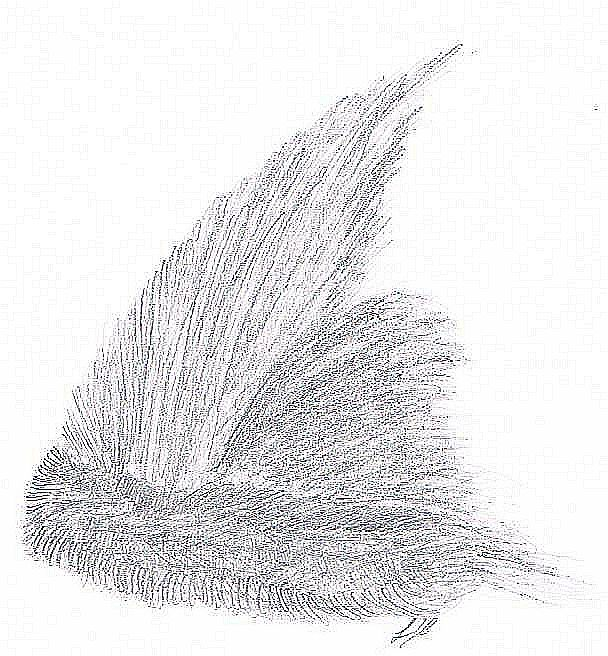
Katapu made of rattan, covered with animal fur

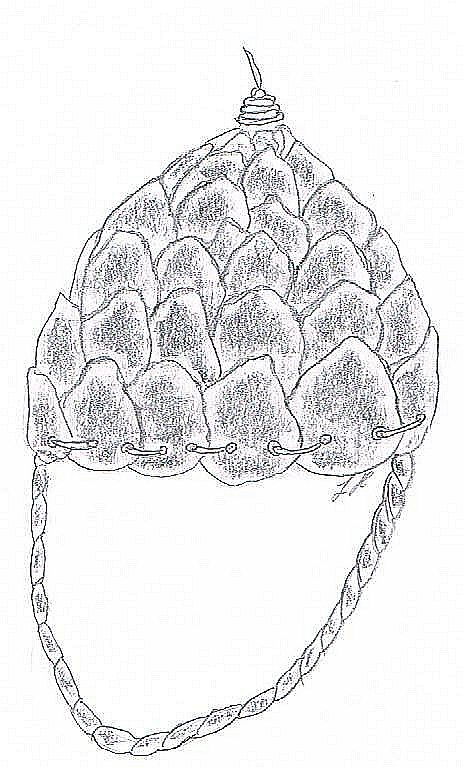
Katapu made of rattan, decorated with pangolin scales

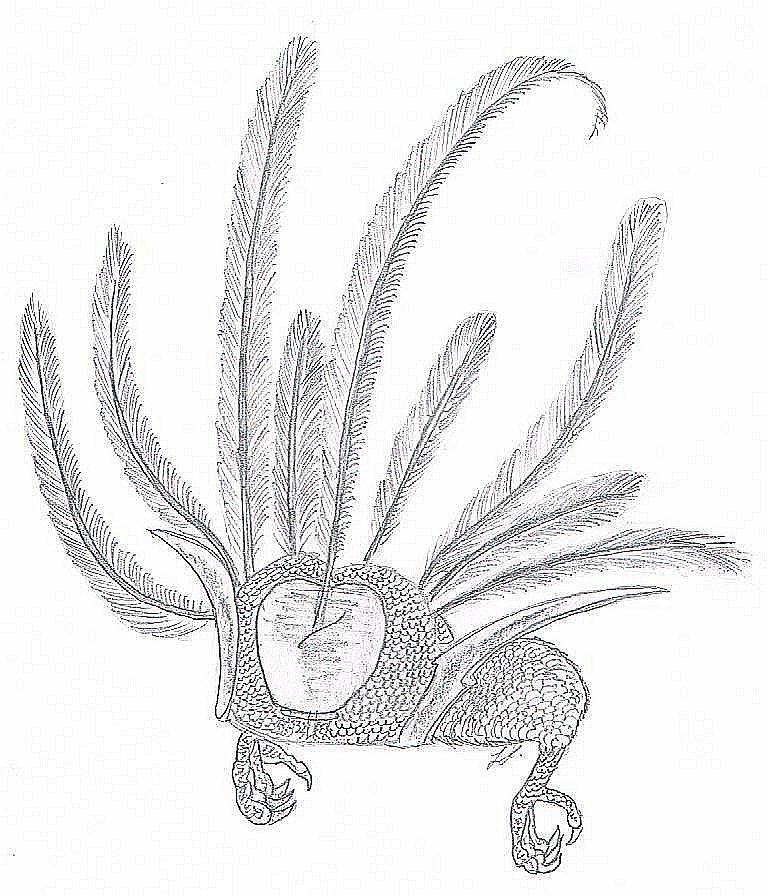
Katapu made of rattan, set with feathers and bird claws

== See also ==
- Takula tofao
- Paseki
