= Takula tofao =

Traditional indonesian battle helmet

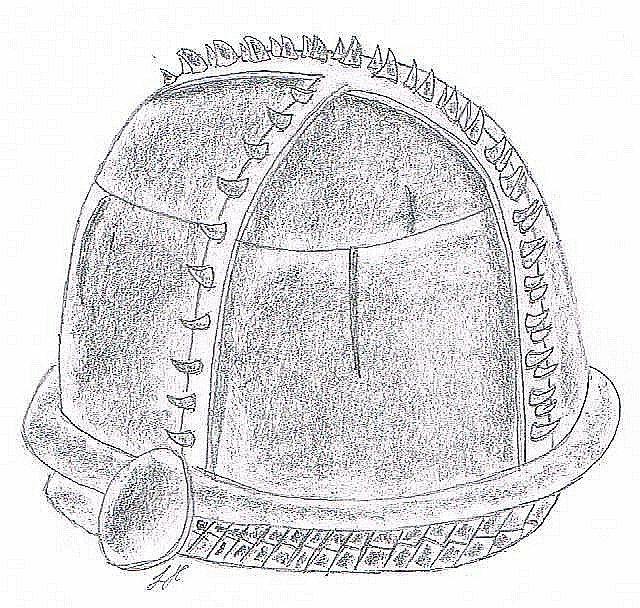
Sketch of a takula tofao

A takula tofao (also tacula tefao) is a traditional battle helmet from Nias Island, Indonesia.

== Description ==
A takula tofao is usually made of steel. The shape is bowl-shaped and consists of steel strips that are joined with rivets or metal wire. It has a narrow helmet rim and two combs arranged according to length and width, which are provided with pointed spikes. Some versions have earmuffs attached. The helmet is often decorated with large ornaments made of iron or horn, which are elaborated in the shape of the tree of life or as fantasy figures. The inner helmet consists of braided rattan cords. Takula tofaos are used by the Nias ethnic group in Indonesia.

== Gallery ==
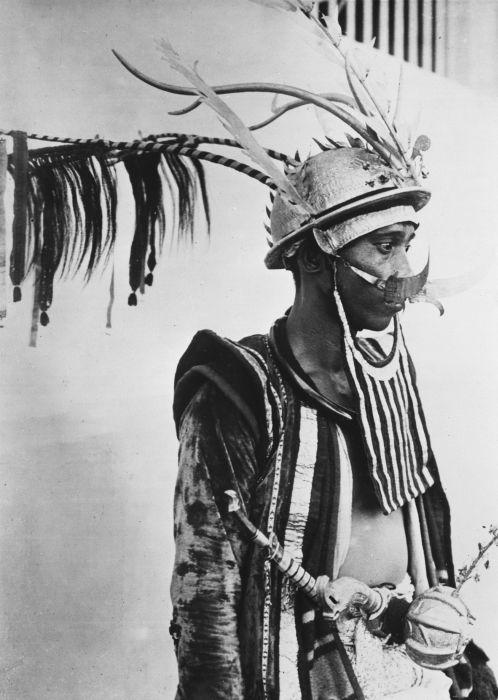
Indonesian warrior with Takula Tofao helmet

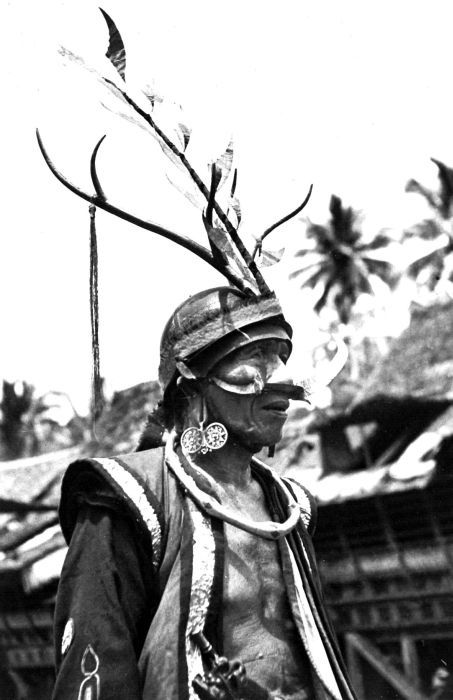
A resident of Nias in military clothing

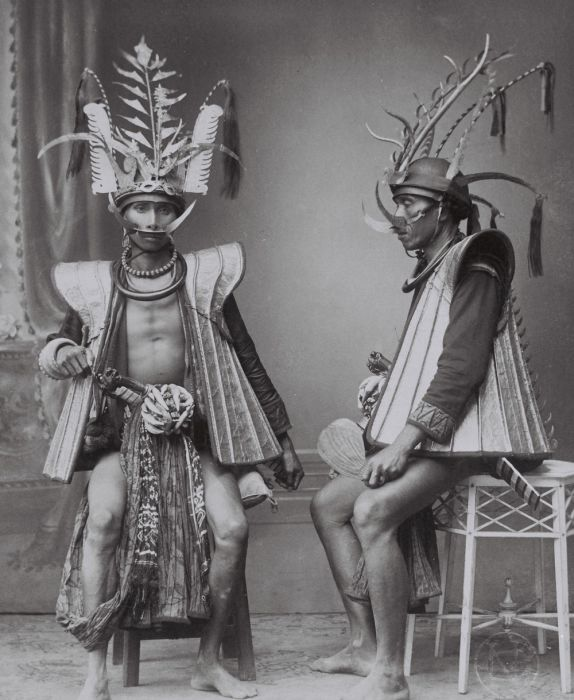
Two men in war attire, South Nias

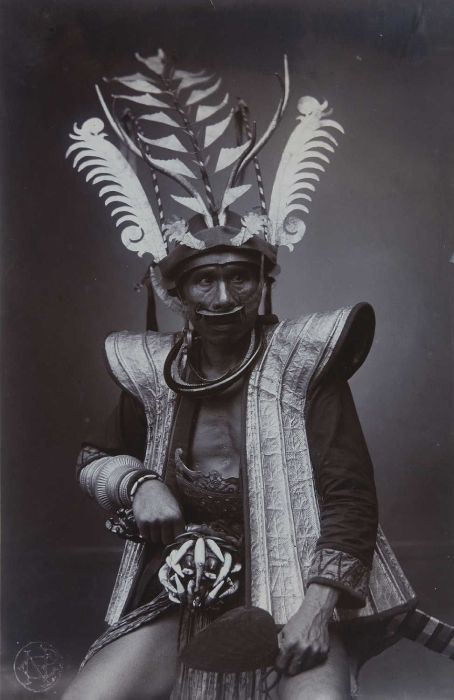
Studio portrait of a man dressed as a warrior

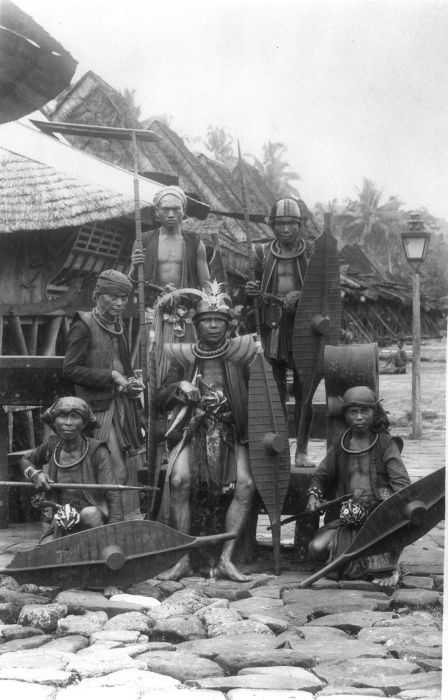
Group portrait of men dressed as warriors, South Nias

== See also ==
- Katapu
- Paseki
