= Paseki =

Indonesian battle helmet

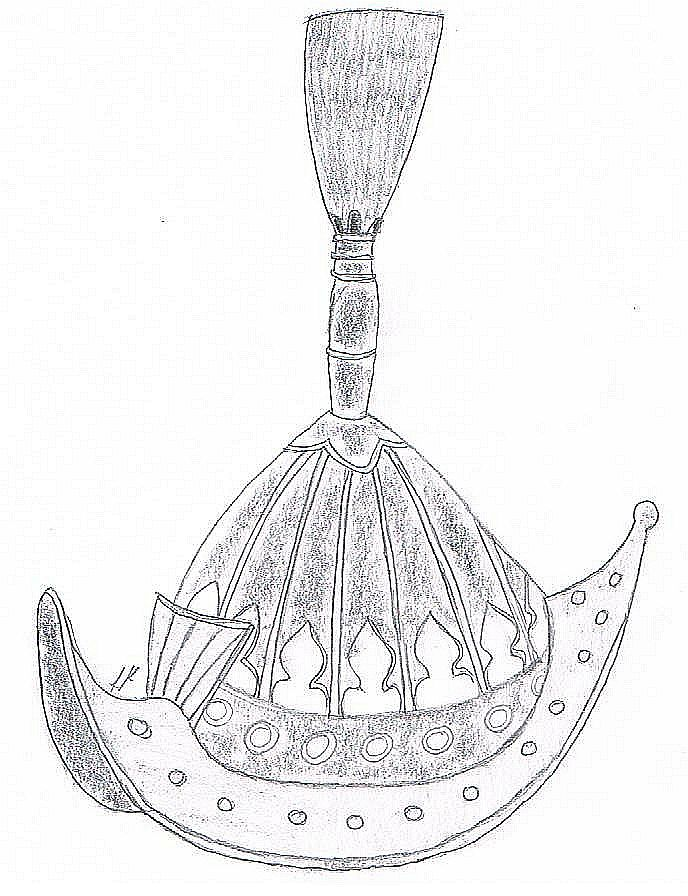
Sketch of a paseki

Paseki is a helmet from Indonesia. It is used by the ethnic groups of eastern Indonesia, such as the Toraja and Minahasa of Sulawesi.

== Description ==
The paseki is usually made of brass. It is made on the model of the Spanish Morion helmets. The first versions of these helmets were imported to Indonesia by the VOC (Dutch East India Company) around 1602 to 1795. The helmets are richly decorated with metal pads and a helmet bush (decoration). The helmet bush is made according to the own wishes of the Indonesian warriors.

== Gallery ==
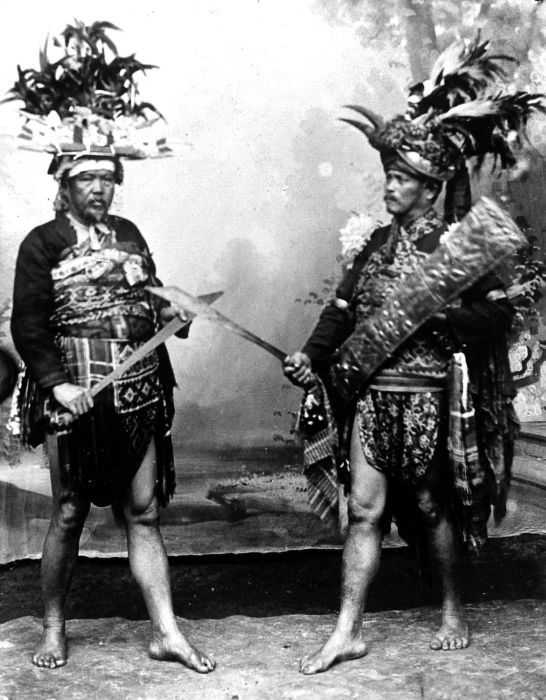
Minahasan men with ancient war equipment

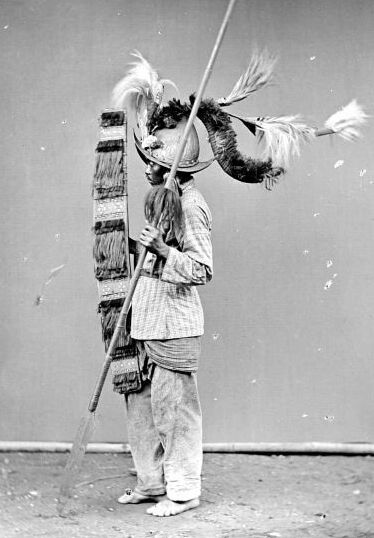
Man from South Celebes in military costume

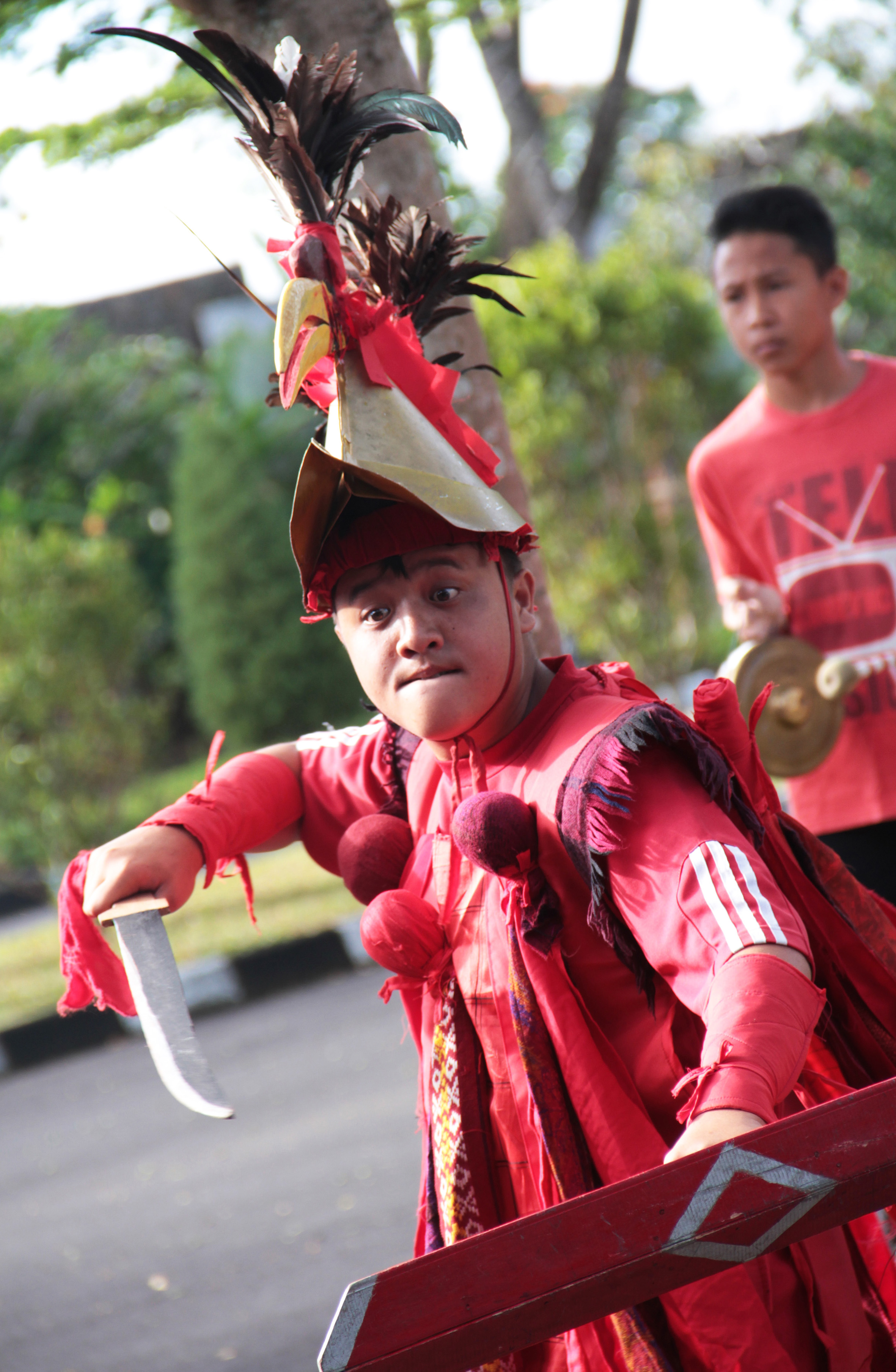
A performer of Kabasaran dance, Minahasa ethnic

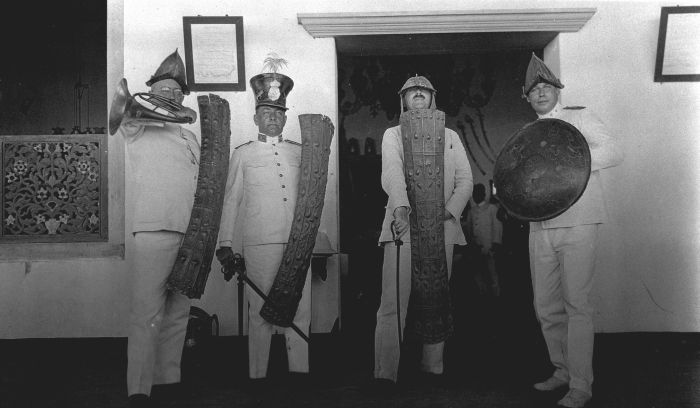
Prof.Rodenwalt and Dr.de Wolf with traditional arms posing in front of the house of the Sultan of Ternate

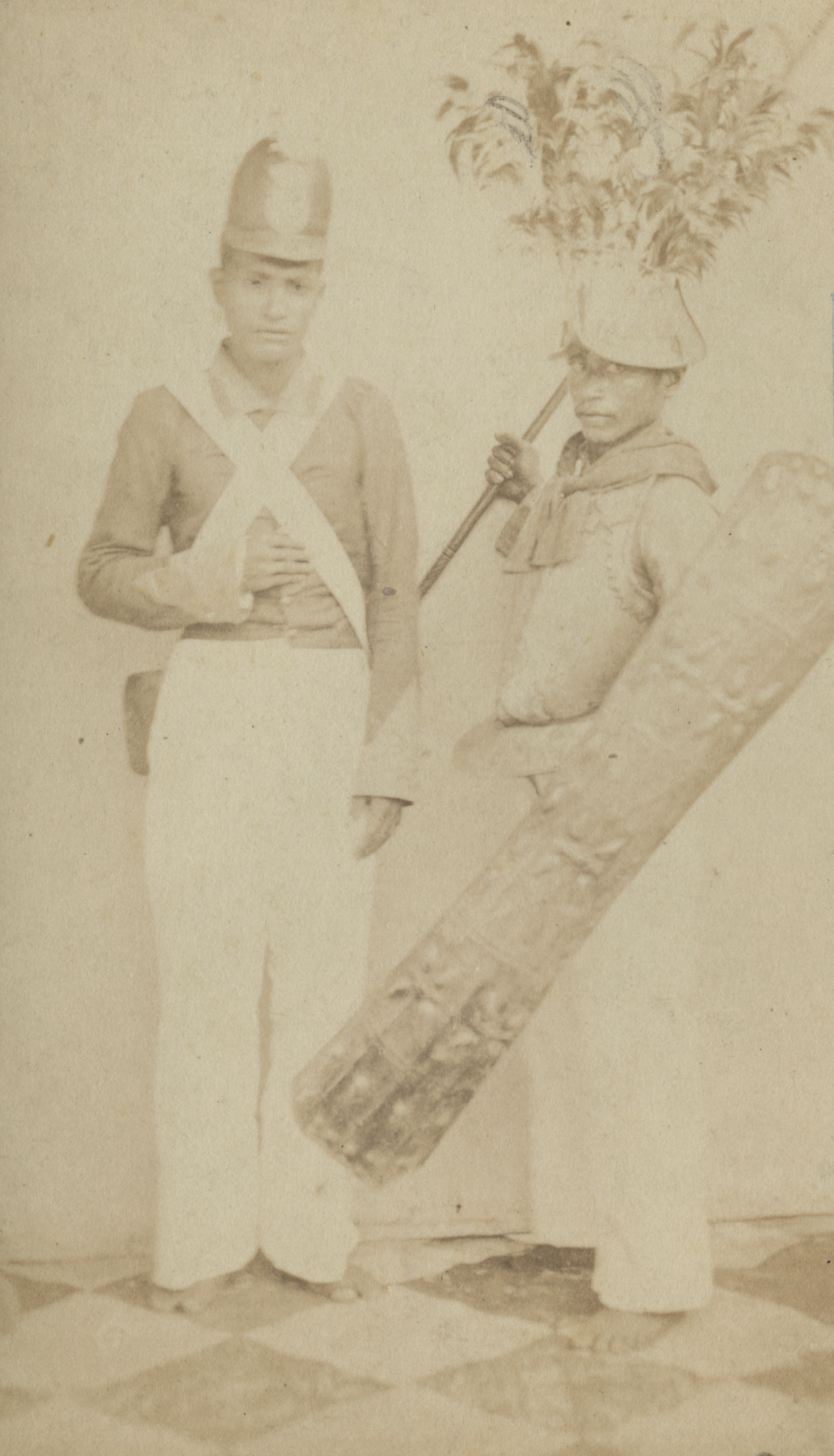
Soldier and halberdier of the Sultan of Ternate - circa 1870

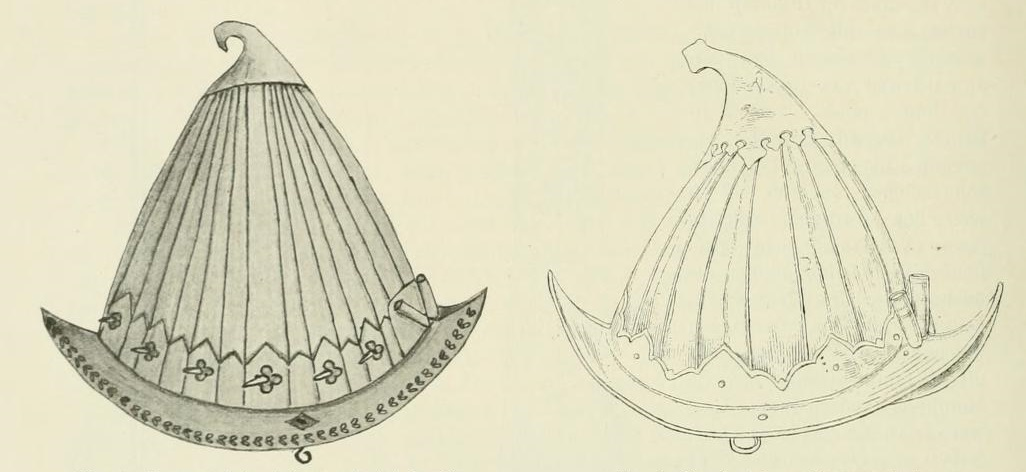
Left: Copper helmet belonging to the national jewelry in Parigi. Right: Tao Boetai; brass helmet.

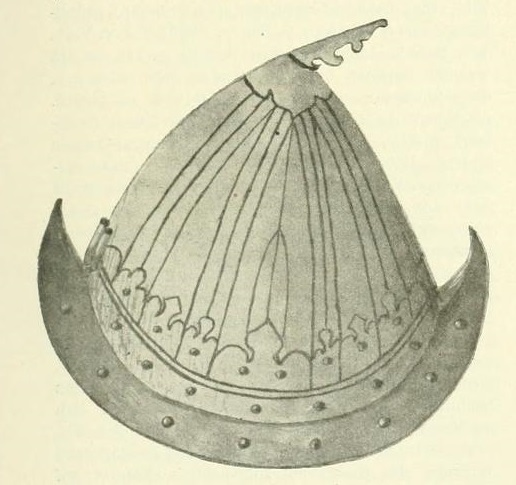
A copper helmet from Poso, Sulawesi

== See also ==
- Katapu
- Takula tofao
