= Surakarta (game) =

Surakartan board game

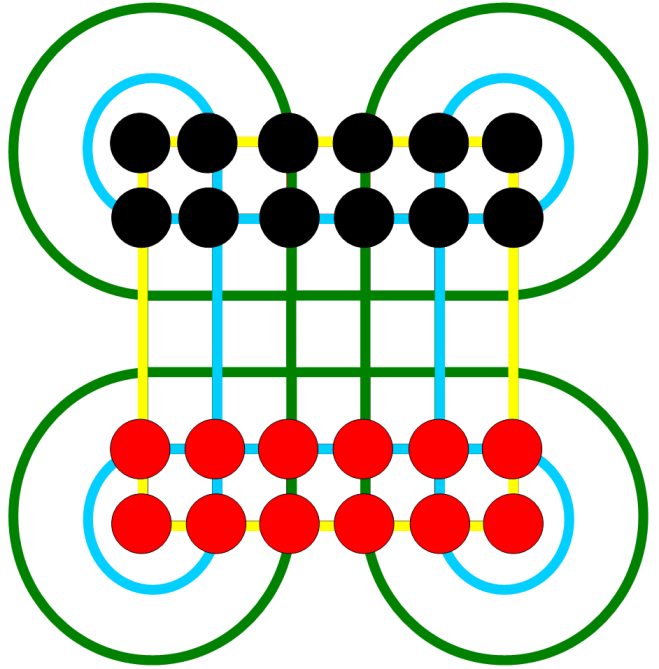
Surakarta gameboard and starting setup

Surakarta is an Indonesian abstract strategy board game for two players, named after Surakarta, Central Java. The game features an unusual method of capture which is "possibly unique" and "not known to exist in any other recorded board game". Little is known about its history.

The name of the game in Indonesian is permainan, which simply translates as "the game". In Java, the game is also called dam-daman. It was first published in France in 1970 as "Surakarta". The game is called "Roundabouts" in Sid Sackson's The Book of Classic Board Games.

== Equipment ==
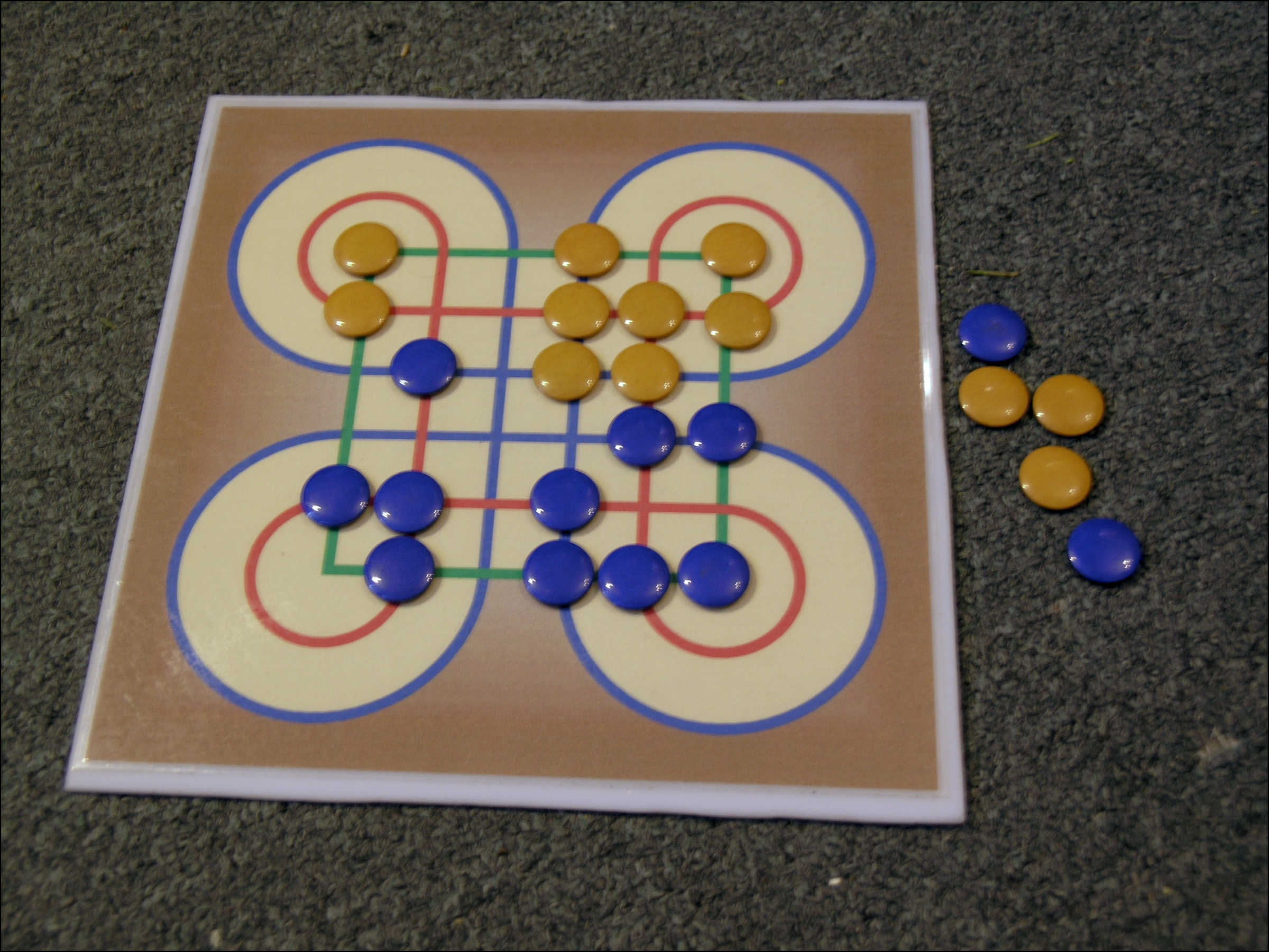
Surakarta with blue and yellow counters

Traditional Indonesian game pieces are shells versus pebbles or stones, with the board grid inscribed in sand or volcanic ash. But any easily distinguished sets of pieces may be used (e.g. counters distinguished by colour, as shown). Players begin the game with 12 pieces each.

== Rules ==
Players decide who moves first, then turns alternate. The object of the game is to capture all 12 of the opponent's pieces; or, if no further captures are possible, to have more pieces remaining in play than the opponent.

Pieces always rest on the points of intersection of the board's grid lines. On a turn, a player either moves one of their pieces a single step in any direction (forwards, backwards, sideways, or diagonally) to an unoccupied point, or makes a capturing move special to Surakarta.

=== Capturing move ===
A capturing move consists of traversing along an inner or outer circuit (coloured blue and green in the diagram, but red and blue in the photo) around at least one of the eight corner loops of the board, followed by landing on an enemy piece, capturing it. Captured pieces are removed from the game.

Corner loops are used only when making a capture. The capturing piece enters and leaves the circular loop via a grid line tangent to the circle. Any number of unoccupied points may be travelled over, before or after traversing a loop. An unoccupied point may be travelled over more than once during the capturing piece's journey. Only unoccupied points may be travelled over; jumping over pieces is not permitted.

Capturing is always optional (never mandatory).

=== End of game ===
A game is won when a player captures all 12 of the opponent's pieces. If neither side can make headway, the game is ended by agreement and the winner is the player with the greater number of pieces in play.

=== Scoring ===
A match consists of more than one game. Players agree beforehand how the winner will be determined. A couple of methods are typically used:

- Playing a fixed number of games: Each game is scored by the number of pieces in play at the end of the game. The winner is the player with higher total points after all games have finished.
- Playing to a fixed number of points: New games are played until one player reaches or exceeds the winning point total.

== Strategy ==
In general, pieces are more powerful toward the centre of the board, where they are in one or two sets of loops. Pieces on the corner, on the other hand, are easy to trap, as the spaces next to the corner can be attacked in a number of directions.

== Computer opponents ==
Surakarta is one of the games played regularly at the annual Computer Olympiad.

== Variants ==
Expanded 7×7 board for bas-basan sepur

Surakarta variants are also played in rural China and Korea, with slightly different rules and boards. In these variants, pieces cannot step diagonally, and can slide along the outer circuit without capturing a piece.

A 7×7 grid variant with 14 pieces for each player is played in Yogyakarta, Java, Indonesia and is called Bas-basan sepur. Whereas the game Surakarta is smaller with a 6x6 grid and only 12 pieces, but both games have the two capturing circuits (inner and outer circuits), and employ the same rules. Bas-basan sepur today is rarely known in Yogyakarta with only 5.6% of participants in one 2016 survey showing knowledge of the game. (Note: Questionnaires were provided by Kinderstation International of which most of the participants surveyed were in Yogyakarta specifically with students mostly between the grades 4-6 in SD Muhamadiyah Condong Chess and Schools.) Back in the 1980s the game was played often in some areas of Yogyakarta (such at the Imogiri and Bantul areas).
