= Baru Öröba =

Traditional armor of the Nias people

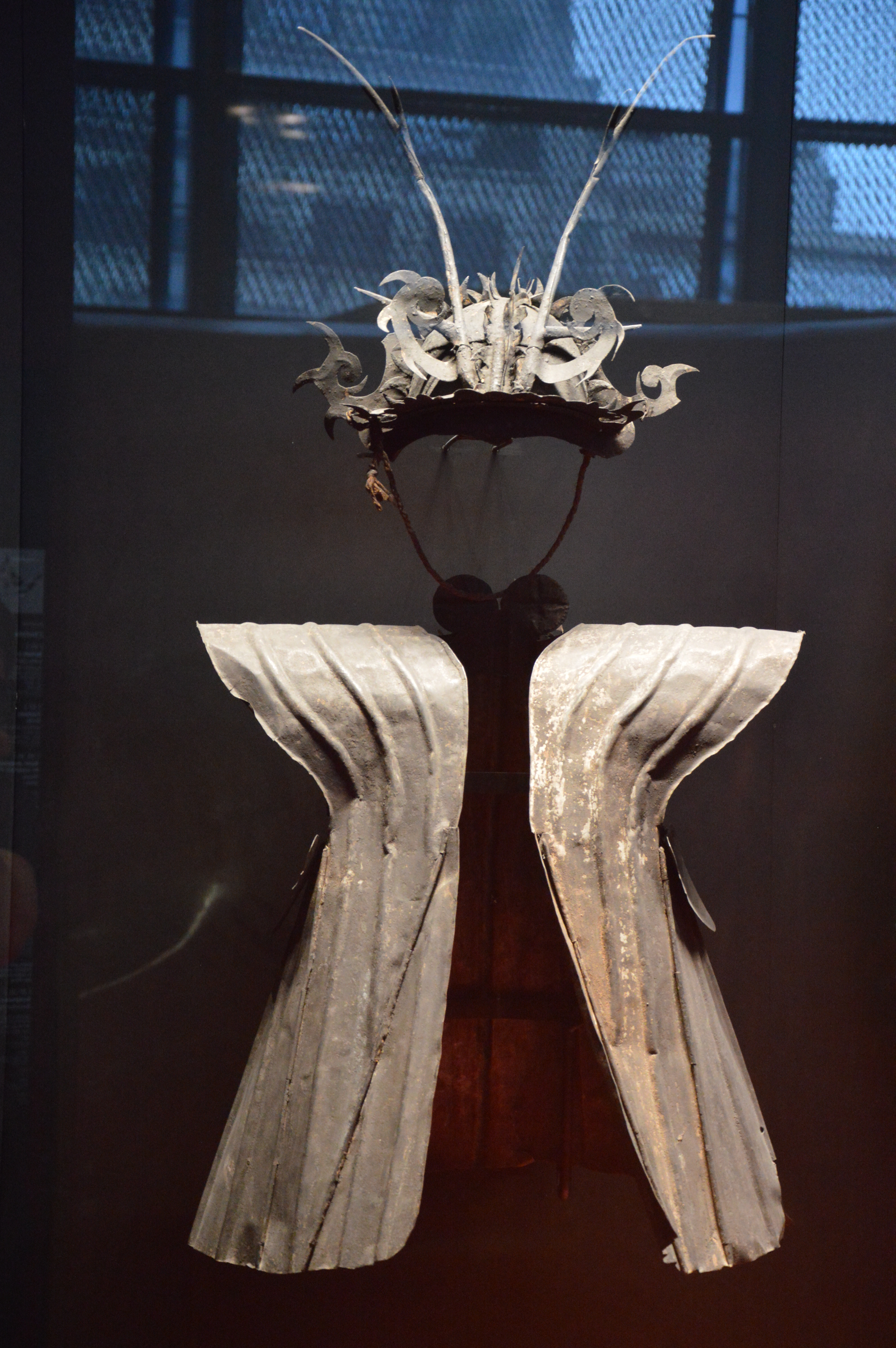
Baru Oroba display in Musée du Quai Branly – Jacques Chirac

Baru Öröba is the traditional armor of the Nias people in Indonesia. The earliest examples of this type of armor were made out of crocodile skin. After the crocodile can no longer be found on Nias, the material is replaced with hammered metal.

== Description ==
Oroba is a native vest-shaped armor from Nias Island. The older ones that were made from crocodile skin are called öroba uli mbuaya. They are made from 11 pieces of crocodile skin that are connected with the ösumö technique. A piece of crocodile's back skin with dermal frills becomes the main part because it is used as the backside material of the vest and its size is bigger than other pieces of skin. Two pieces of skin that are large enough become the cover of the chest to the waist, and two pieces of curved skin turn into a shoulder cover. Another pair of crocodile skin were used to cover the vest, starting from the side of the body, armpits, and backside of the neck. Through a certain process, the crocodile's skin becomes so hard and stiff that it is considered impenetrable by enemy weapons, except for the front, starting from the neck to the lower abdomen, which is not buttoned and protected.

Along with the decline in the number of crocodile populations in Nias, zinc or iron plates began to be used as a substitute for crocodile skin. The Nias war vest, made of zinc or a large plate, is named Öröba Si'öli, which means an iron vest. It is said that zinc or an iron plate is obtained by bartering with merchants called orang seberang (lit. oversea people) by Nias people. The war vest worn for a show is still made today for the purpose of shows and festivals. Made from black cloth, decorated with typical Nias ornaments, colored yellow, red, and black.

== Gallery ==
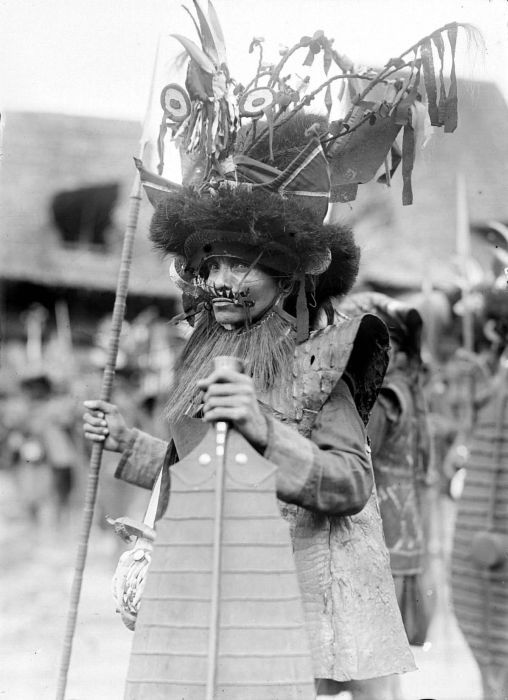
South Nias man with crocodile skin armor

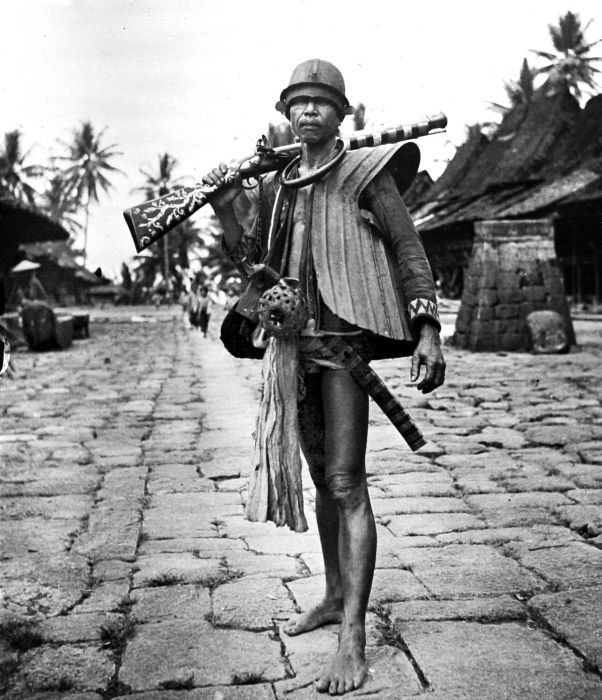
Nias warrior with blunderbuss

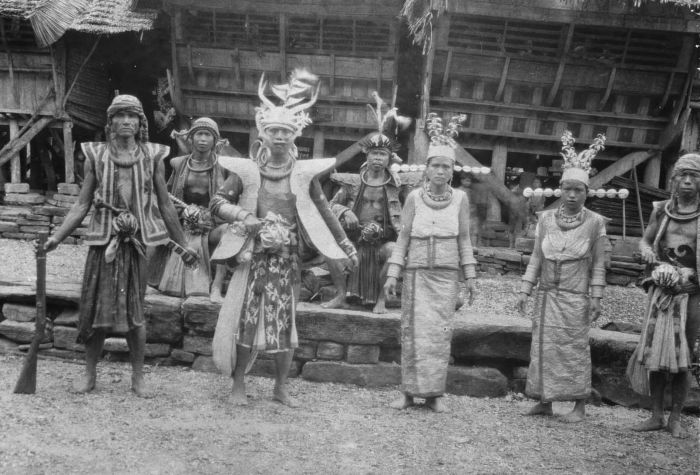
Men in military clothing and two women in ceremonial clothing in Bawodobara

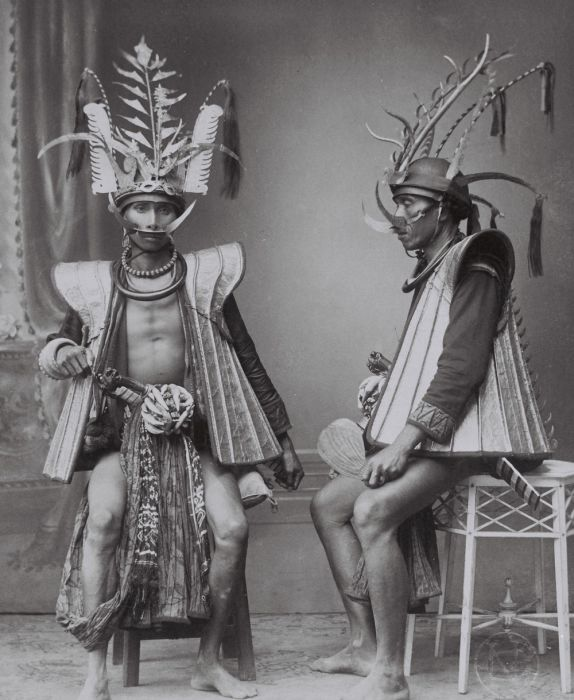
Two men with sheet metal Baru Öröba

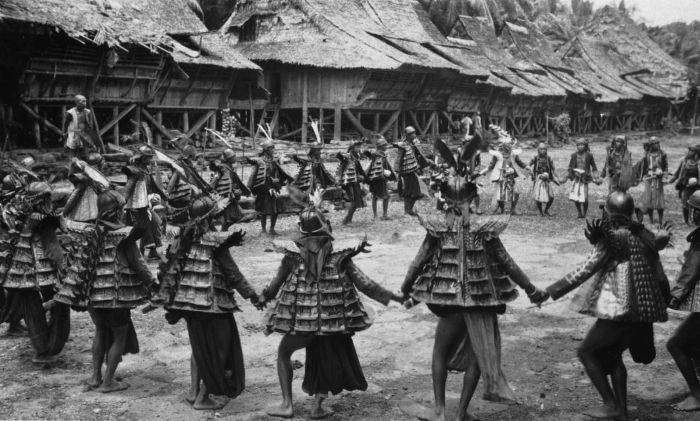
Warriors in Bawodobara performing war dance

== See also ==
- Baju lamina
- Baju empurau
- Baru Lema'a
- Baju rantai
- Takula tofao
- Karambalangan
- Kawaca
- Siping-siping
