= Mail and plate armour =

Type of armour

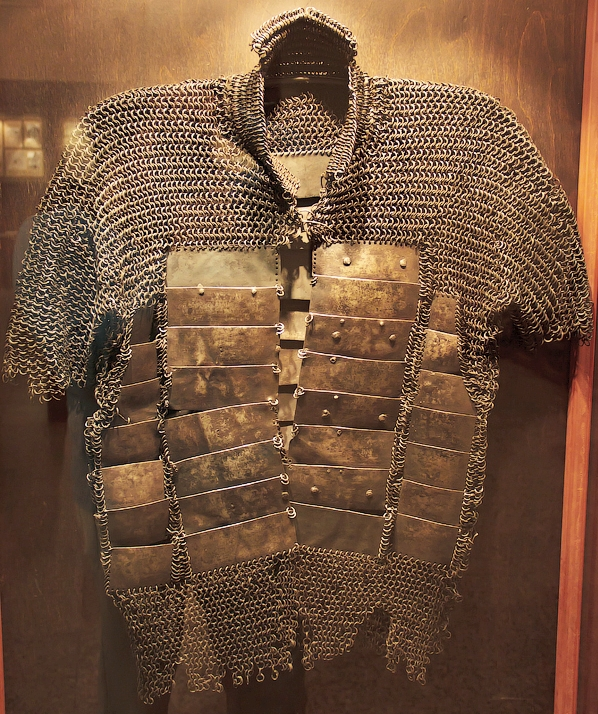
Russian mail and plate armour (behterets), Hermanni linn Museum, Narva, Estonia

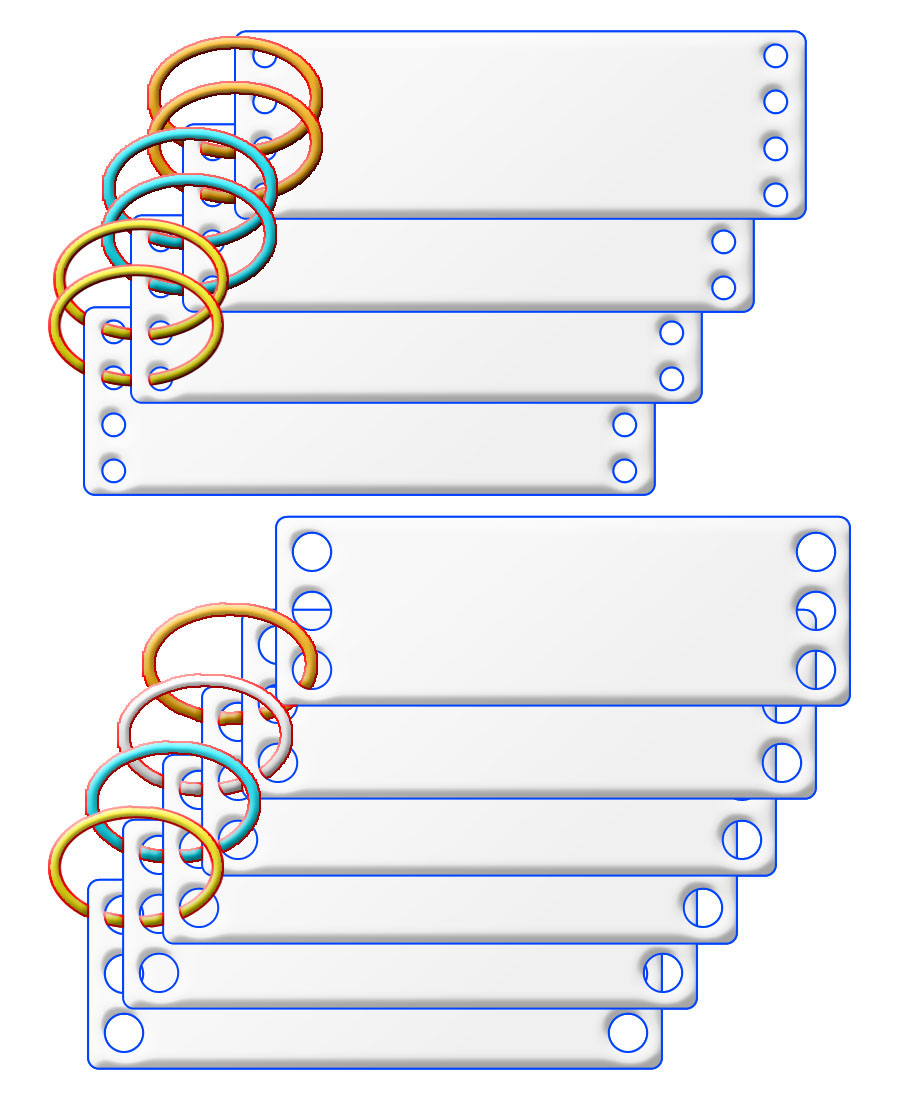
Polish: Bechter diagramm

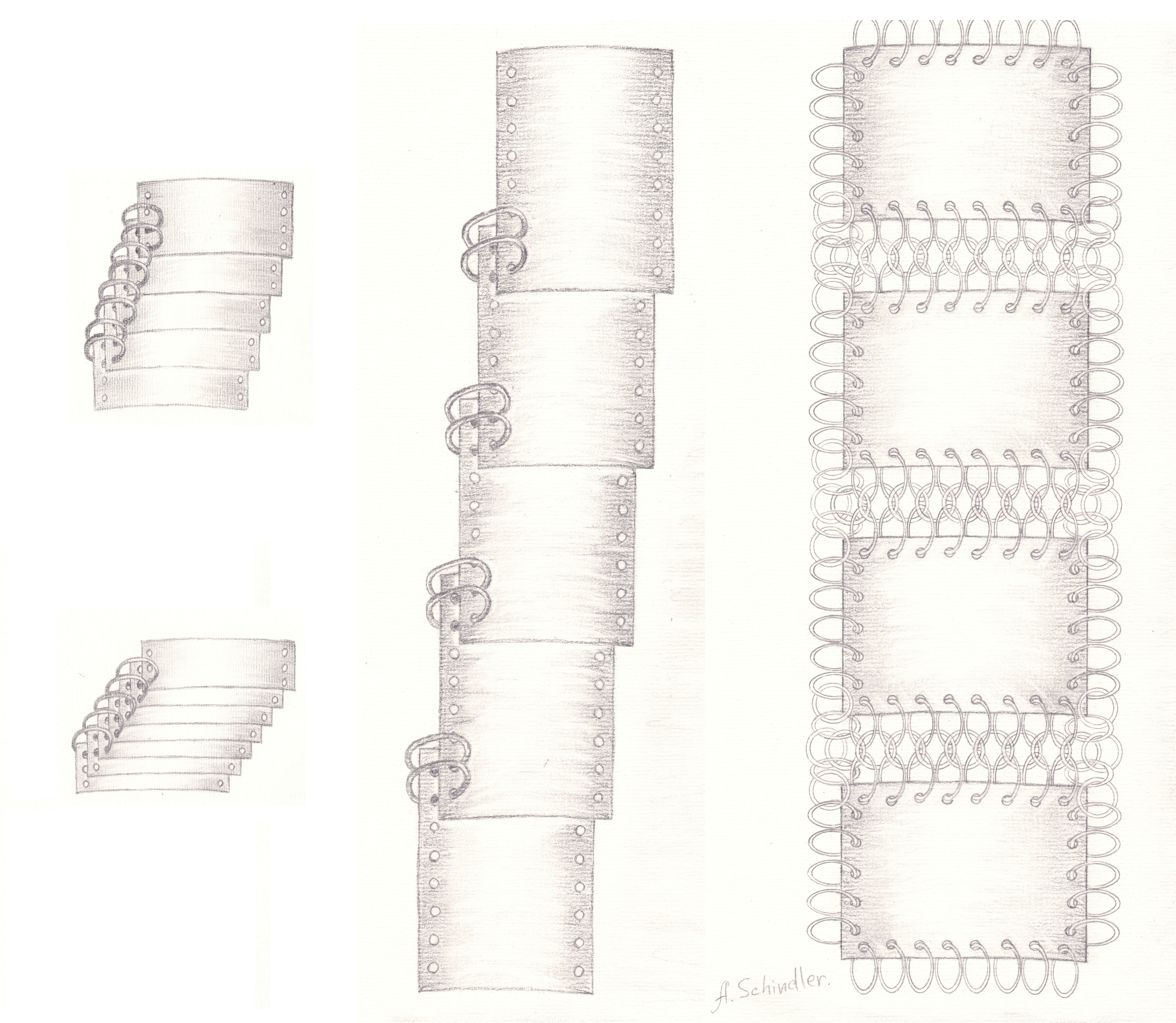
Different methods of joining plates to mail

Mail and plate armour (plated mail, plate mail, plated chainmail, splinted mail/chainmail) is a type of mail with embedded plates. This type of armour has been used by various civilizations throughout Central Asia, East Asia, Eastern Europe, Iran, Indian subcontinent, Middle East,North Africa, Nusantara, and Vietnam.

== Types ==
In Russia, there are three known varieties of mail and plate armour. These were adopted from Persian, initially as Persian exports, and have Persian names.

- Behterets (also spelled Bekhterets; Russian: Бехтерец), from Persian behter: small horizontal plates arranged in vertical rows without gaps, joined by rings, and embedded in mail.
- Yushman (Russian: Юшман), from Persian jawshan: long horizontal plates embedded in mail and resembling laminar armour (e.g. Roman lorica segmentata)
- Kalantar (Russian: Калантарь): square plates embedded in mail, very similar to the Japanese karuta tatami-do. The major difference is that kalantar are not sewn to a cloth backing as Karuta tatami-do are.

According to Bobrov the first mail and plate armor appeared as cuisses in the Middle East, and were imported by the Golden Horde. Persian miniatures of the first half of 15th century show different combinations of mail and plate armour with lamellar armor and brigandines sometimes worn with a single round mirror plate as breast re-enforcement. The first representation of mail and plate armour as body protection is shown in Persian miniatures, which show mail and plate armour composed of relatively large plates, worn with laminar pauldrons and skirt (formed from long, horizontal plates), re-enforced by a large round mirror plate. The first representation of classic mail and plate armour (without lamellar elements) can be seen in Baghdad's miniature which dates from 1465. From the end of the 15th century mail and plate armour began to fully replace lamellar armours. The main difference between eastern European (Russian) and Oriental mail and plate armor (according to Bobrov) is that eastern European versions usually do not have sleeves, while Oriental versions have sleeves (the forearms were protected by vambraces). In a heavy version these sleeves have embedded plates, and a light version (more widely used) has sleeves entirely made from mail.

In Kitab al-Durra al-Maknuna (The Book of the Hidden Pearl) Jābir ibn Hayyān describes mail and plate armour for use in armours (jawasin), helmets (bid), and shields (daraq).

Indian mail was constructed with alternating rows of solid links and round riveted links and it was often integrated with plate protection (mail and plate armour). It was used by the Mughals, Rajputs, Marathas, Afghans, Sikhs, and by other regional powers. Mail and plate armor, called baju lamina, was also used by some of the people of Southeast Asia, namely the Bugis, Torajans and Malay. An early reference of this armor type was mentioned by the son of Alfonso de Albuquerque in the 16th century.

In Japan, mail and plate armour is called "karuta", small square or rectangular rawhide or metal plates with the gaps between them filled with mail.

The first known use of iron plate mail in Korea was used by the Gaya Confederacy between 42 and 562 AD. A large number of iron and steel artifacts, including iron armor, iron horse armor such as helmets and bits, and smaller iron ingots (often used as money), have been found in the Daeseong-dong tombs in Gimhae. Gimhae (김해, 金海) literally means "Sea of Iron", as if the city's name symbolizes the abundance of iron in the area. Surviving examples are currently on display at the Gimhae National Museum in South Korea. The later Korean version of this armour is known as gyeongbeongap (경번갑/鏡幡甲). The most famous general who used this type of armor was General Chonji.

== Gallery ==
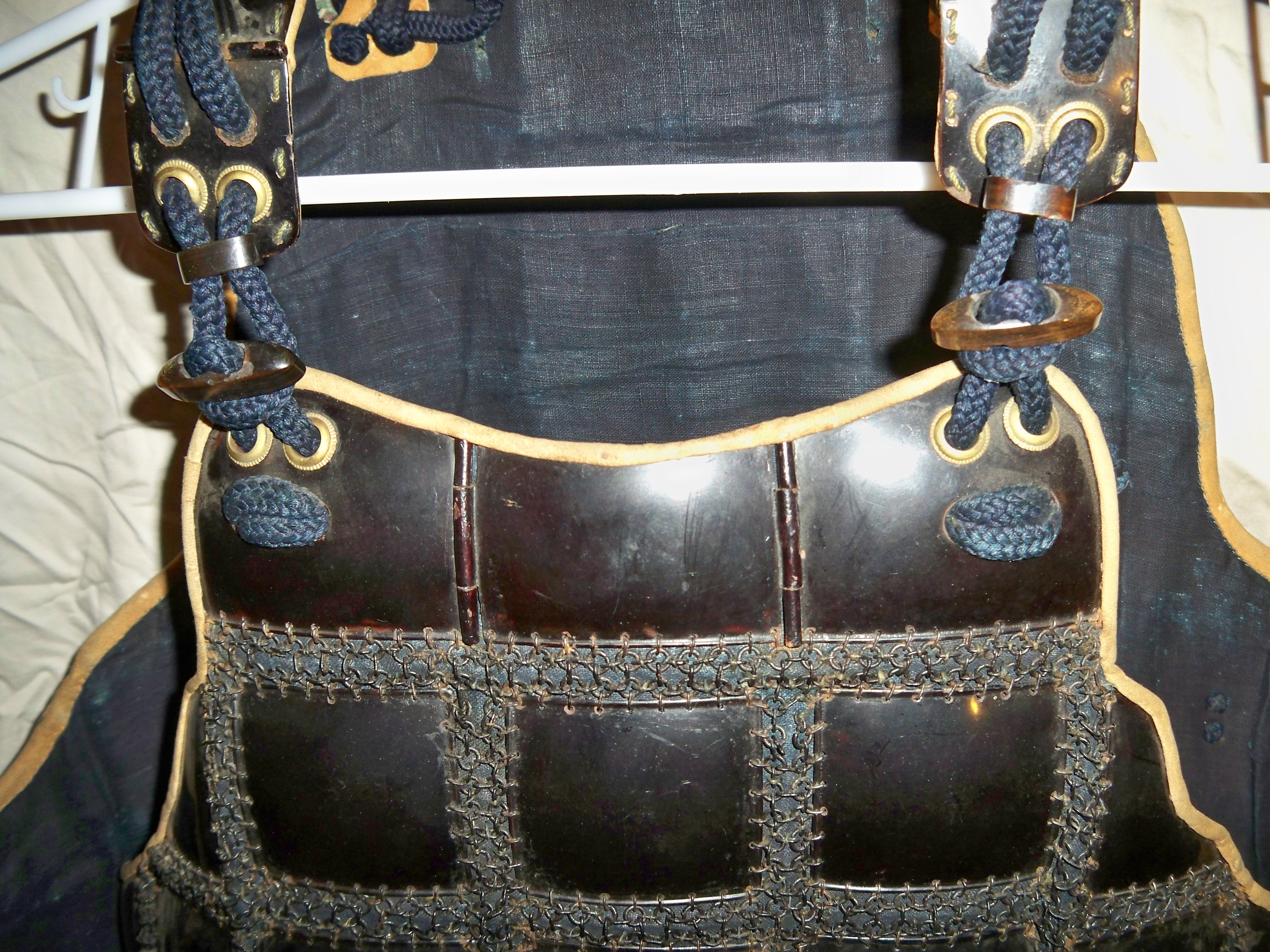
Japanese mail and plate armour in the form of a karuta tatami-do

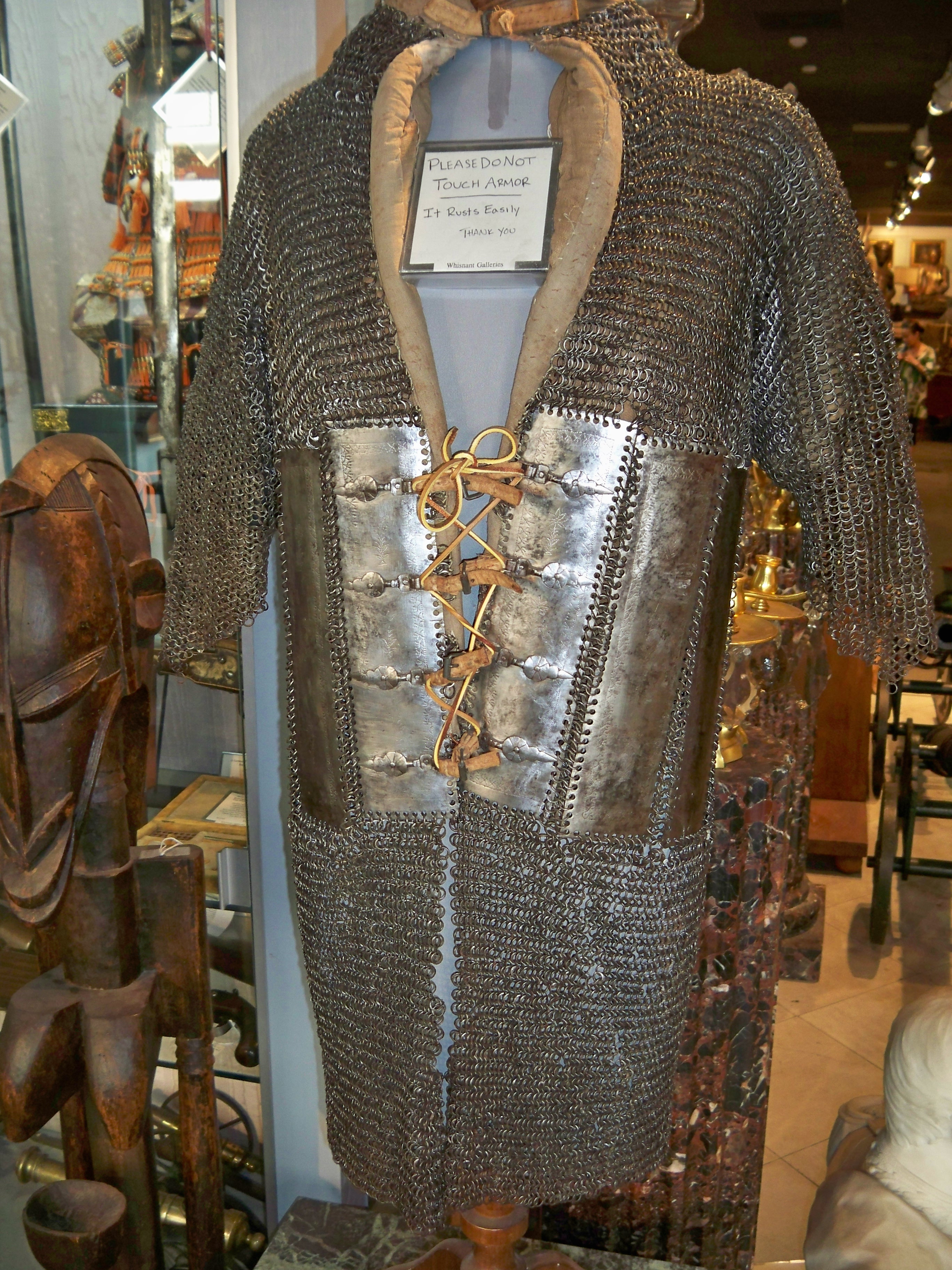
Indian (Mughal) riveted mail and plate coat zirah baktar. Armour of this type was introduced into India under the Mughals.

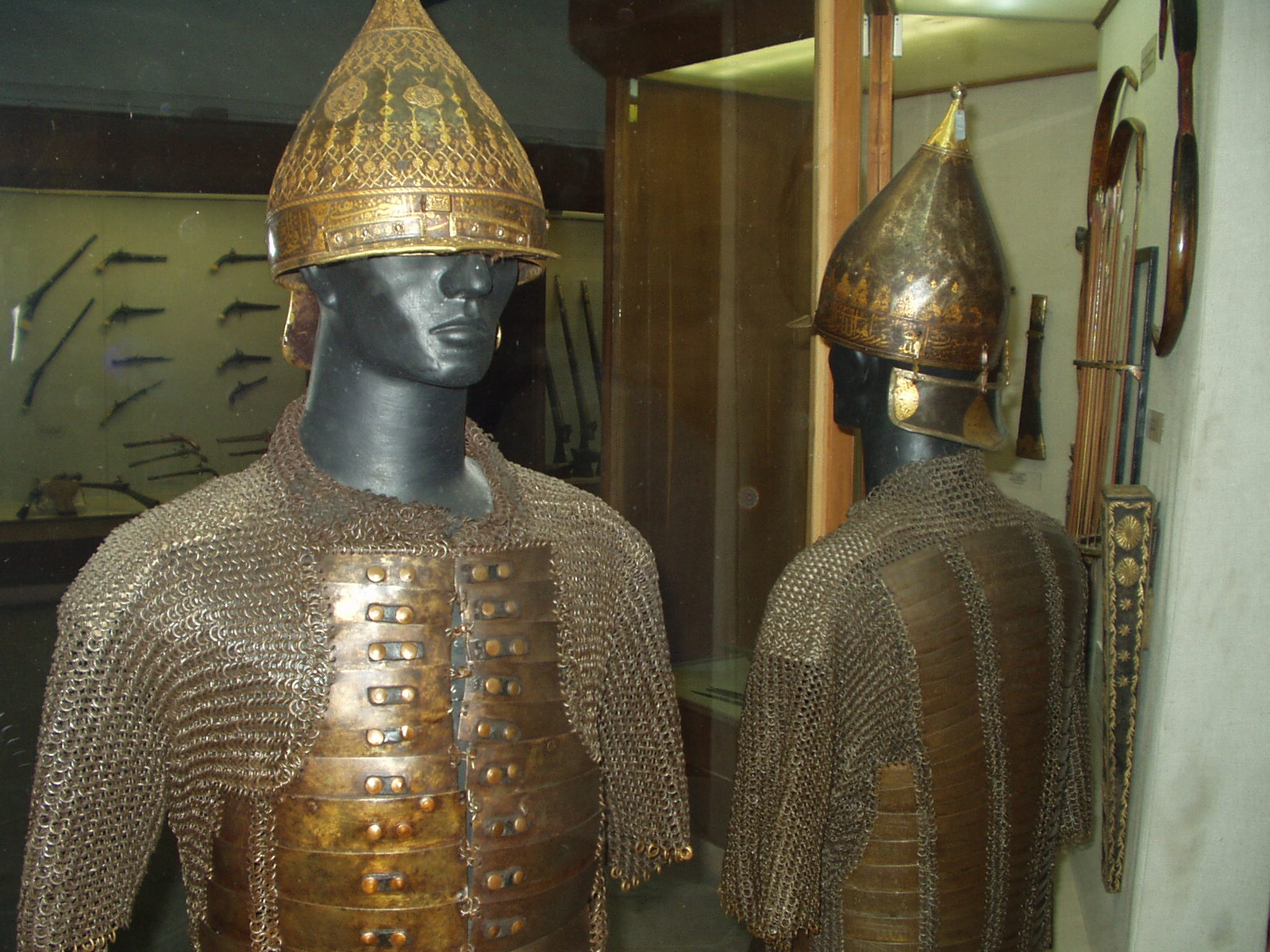
Ottoman (Turkish) mail and plate armor from the Topkapi Palace

Mail and plate armour from Kalhora Sindh

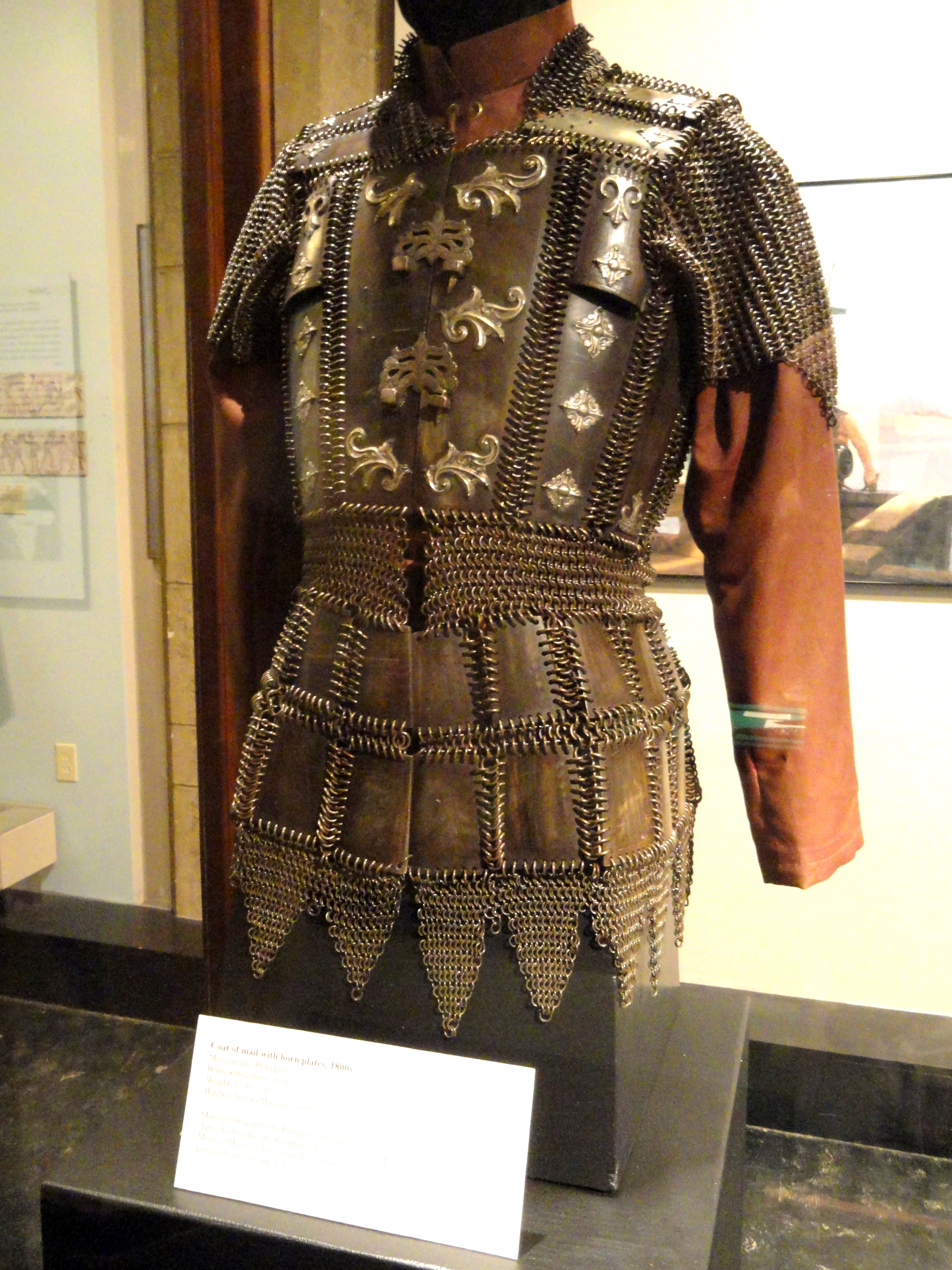
Coat of mail with horn plates, Philippines (Moro people), 1800s. Higgins Armory Museum.

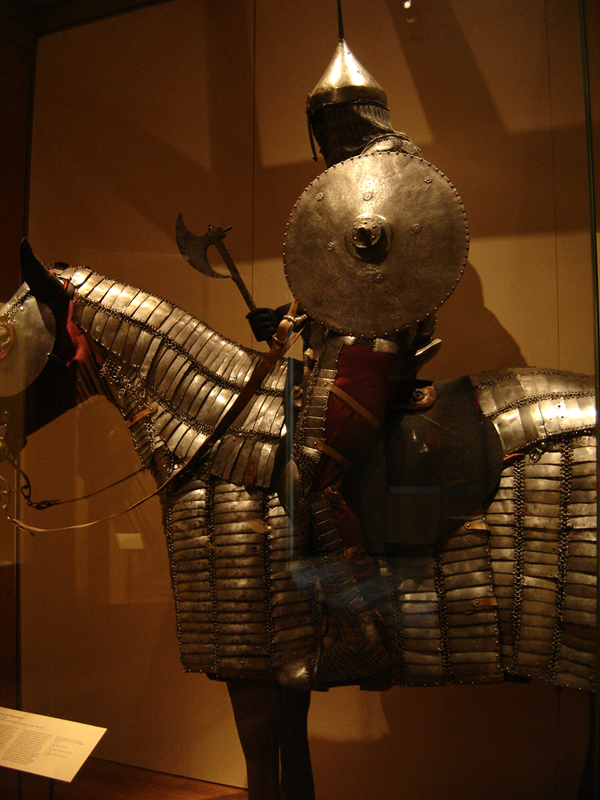
Persian (Iran) mail and plate armour dating from 1450, the New York Metropolitan Museum of Art

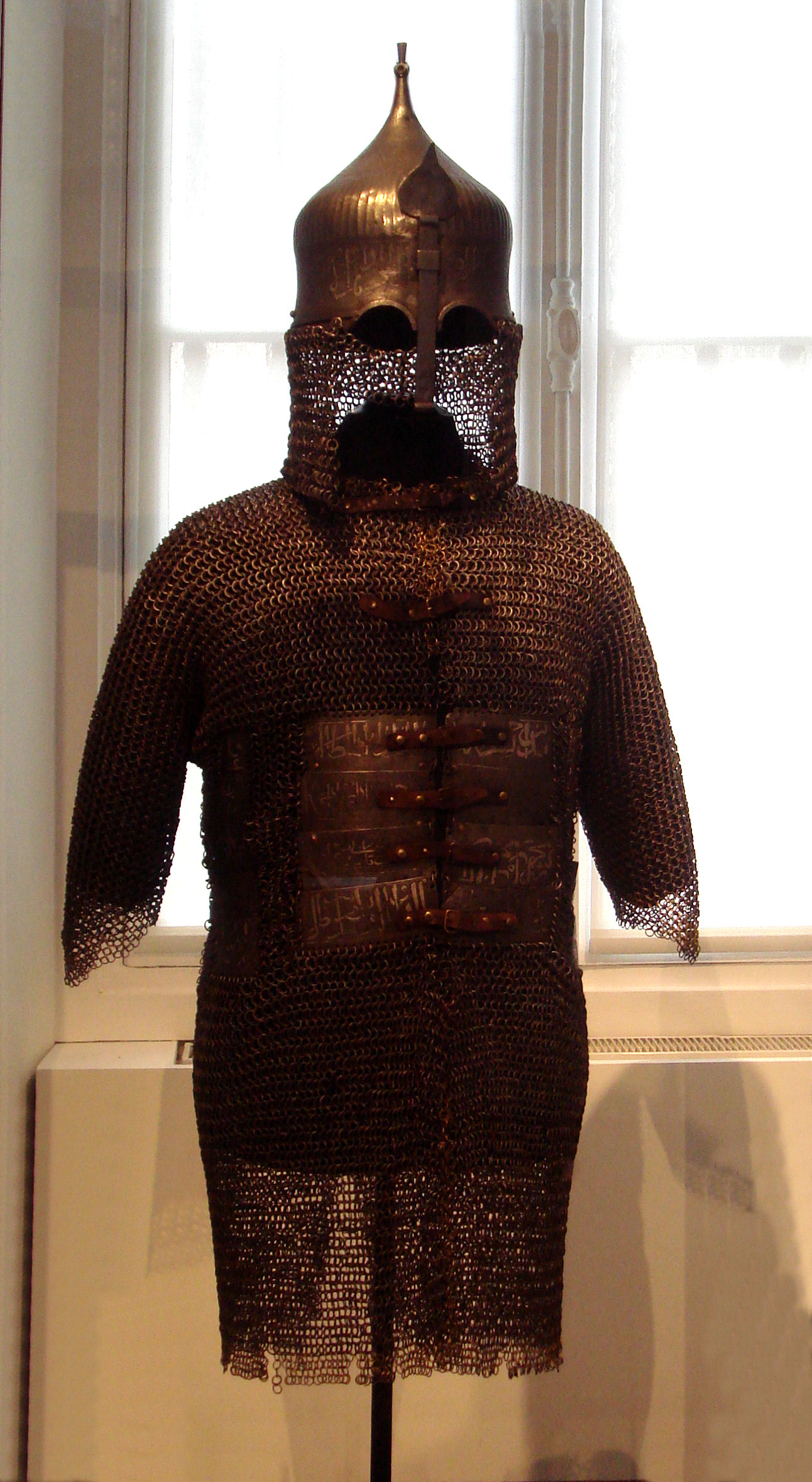
Ottoman Sipahi armour, 1480–1500

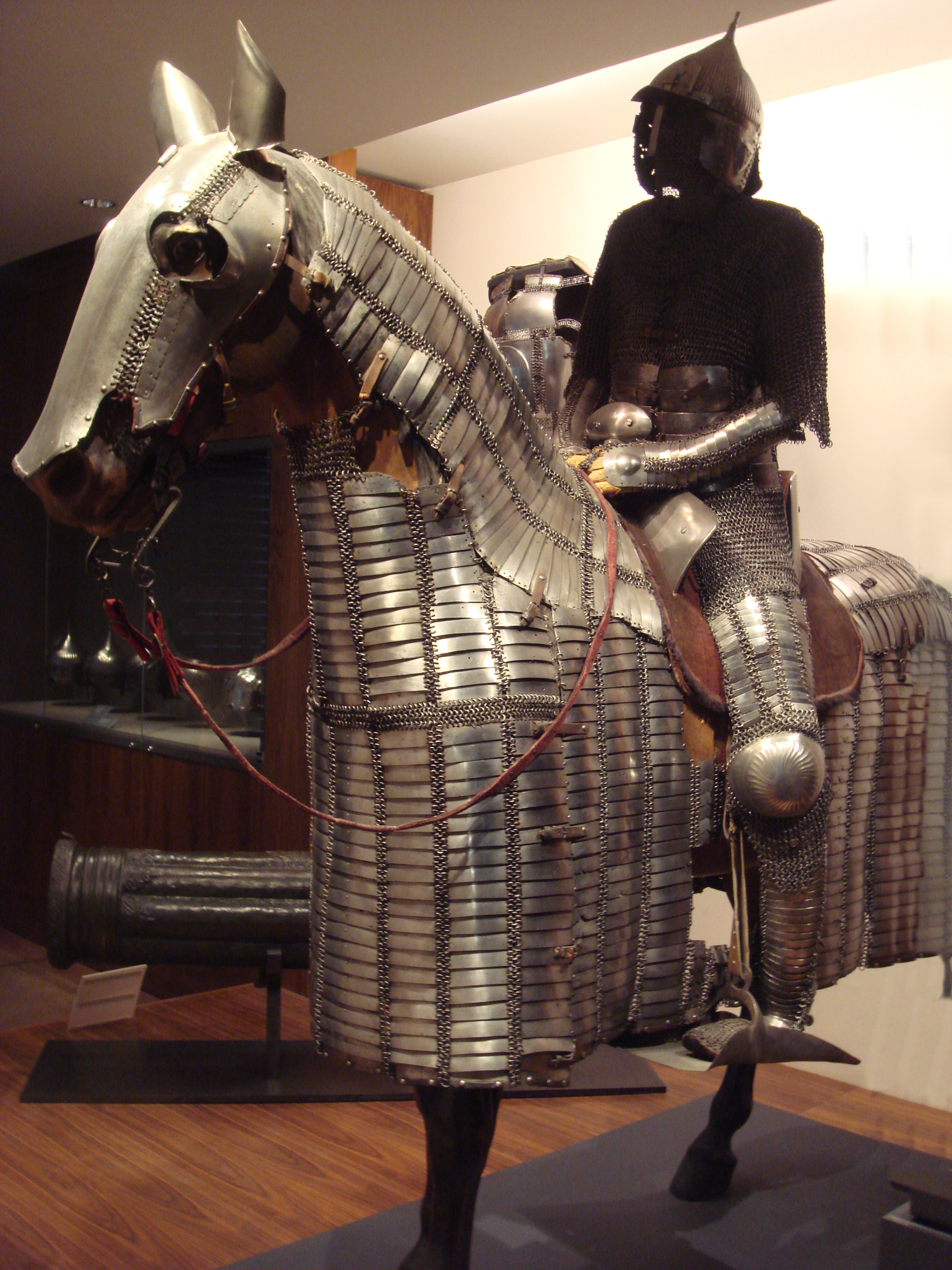
Ottoman Mamluk armour circa 1550

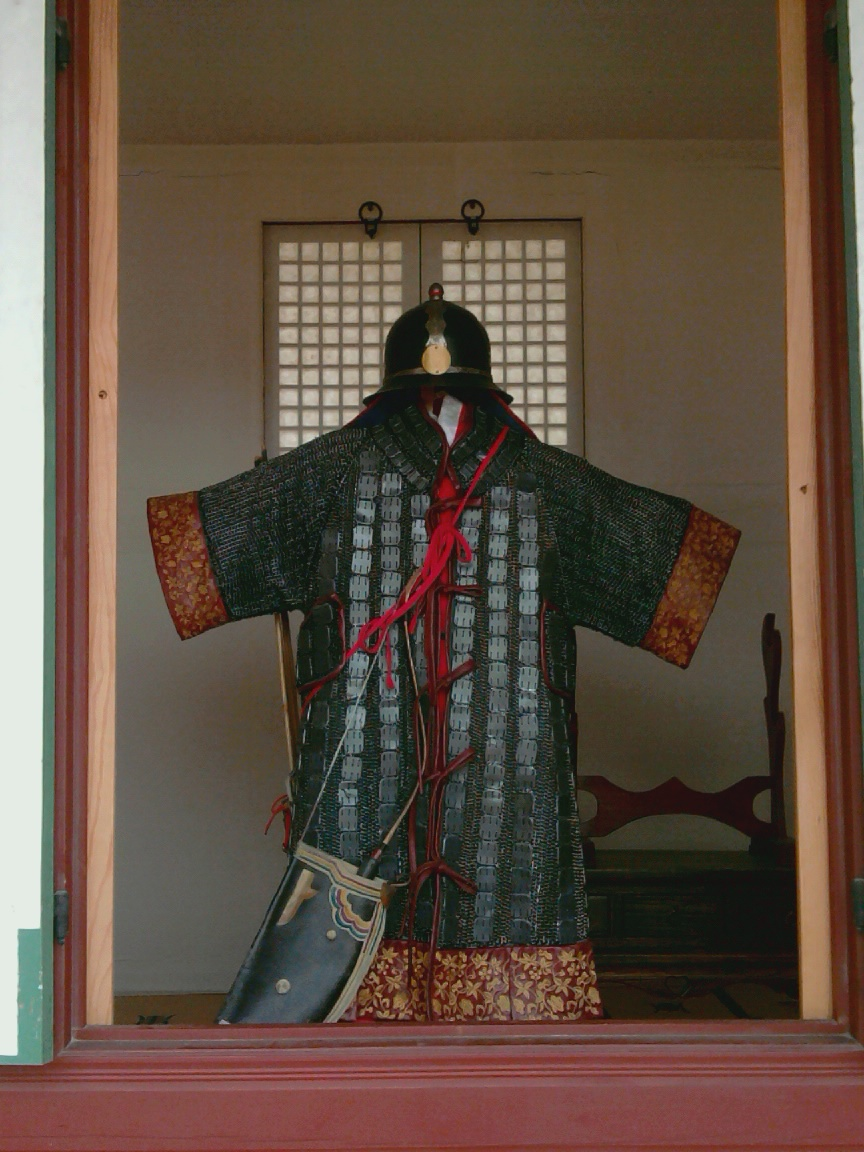
Korean: 조선의 경번갑 (Korean mail and plate armour)

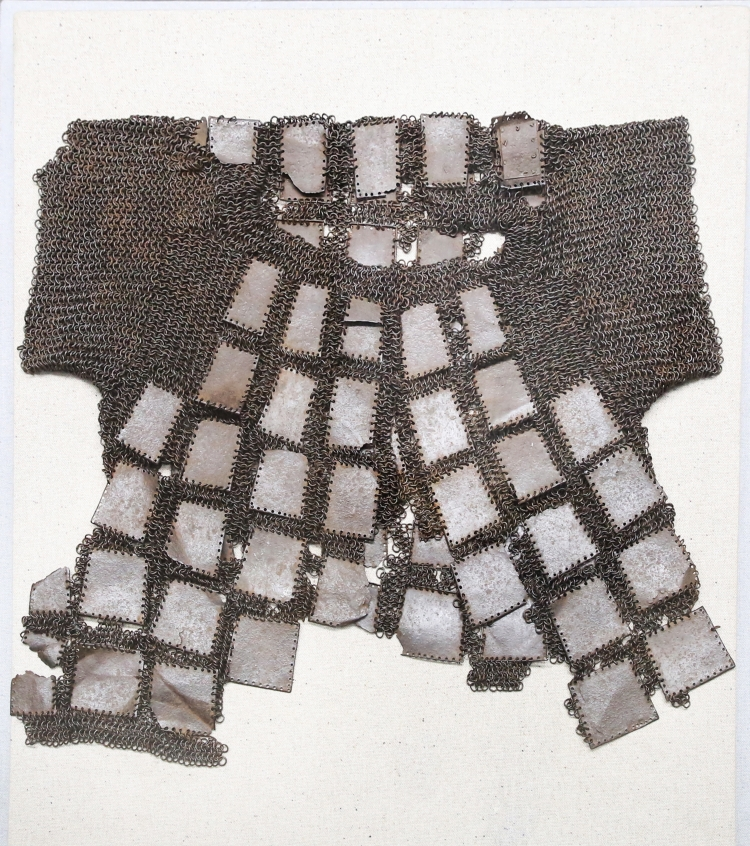
Mail and plate armour (경번갑), Goryeo, 14th c.

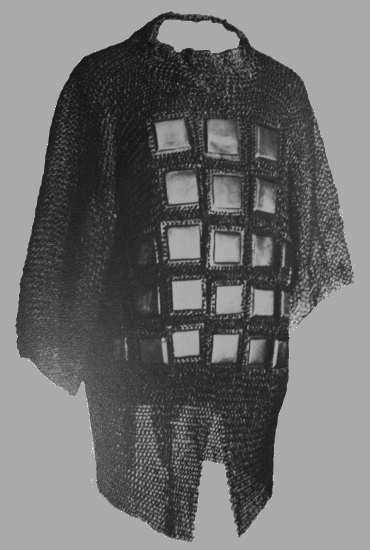
Kalantar Russian: Калантарь

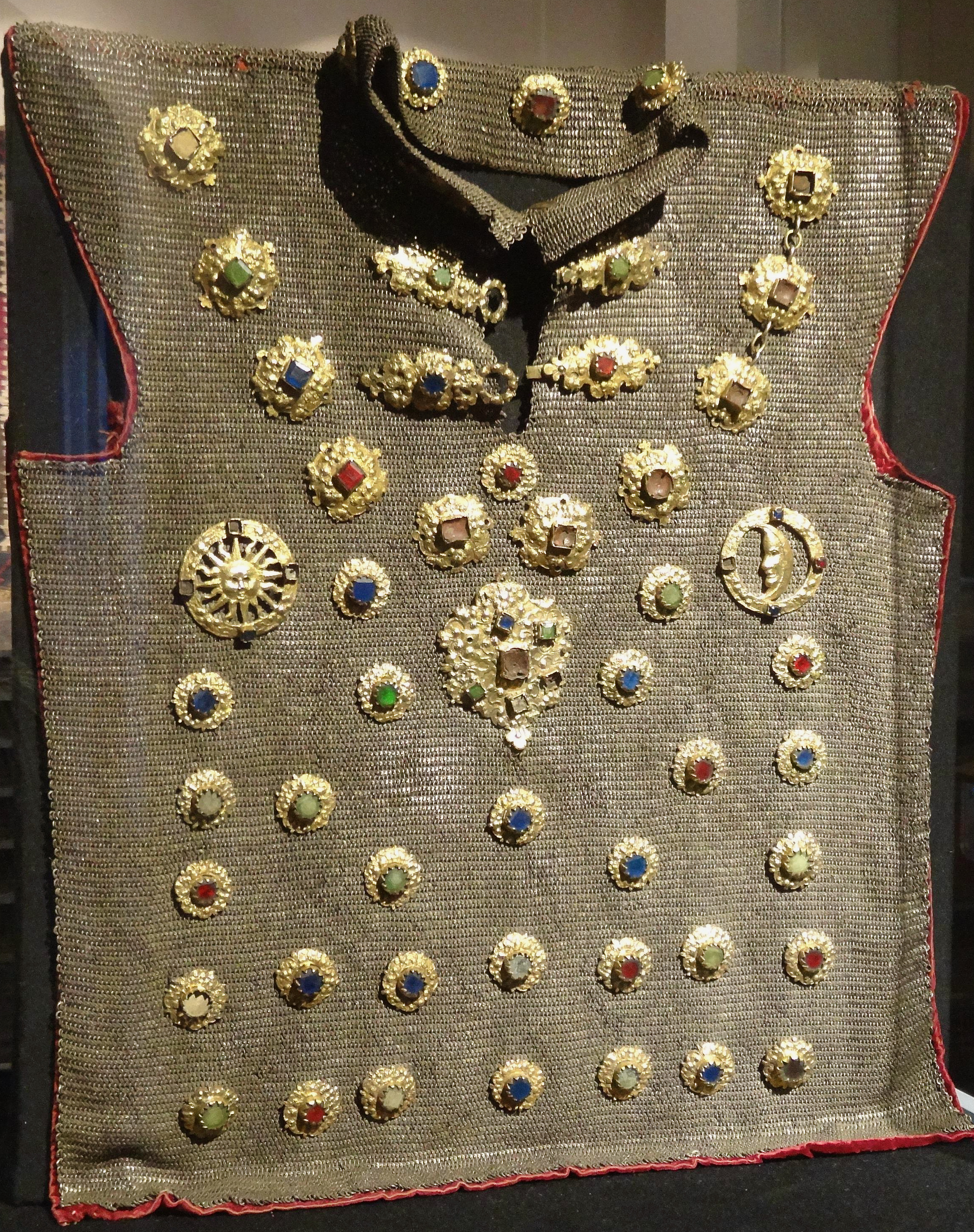
Georgian parade armour with golden plates

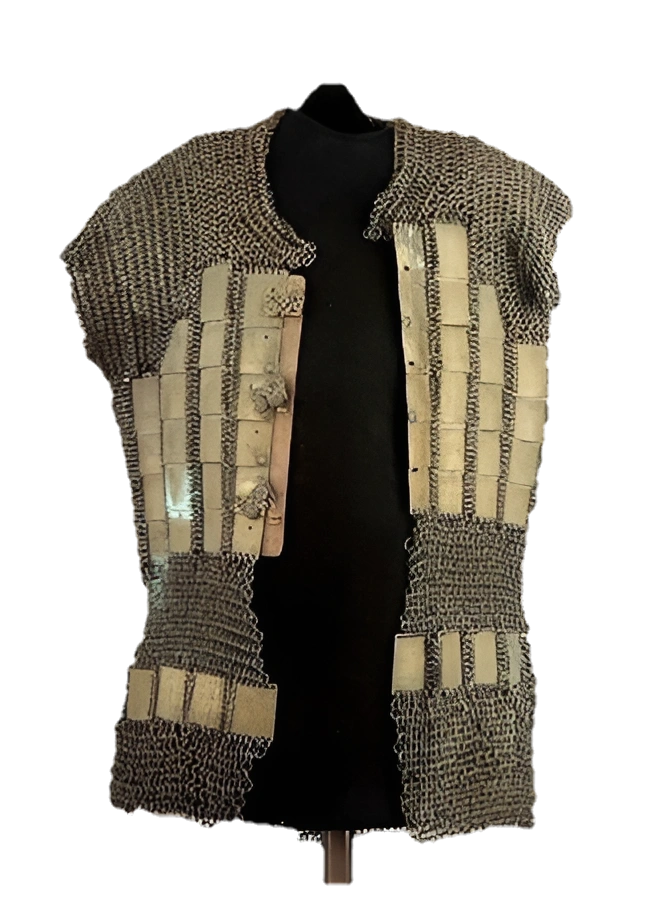
A lamena of Buginese (Indonesian) origin

== See also ==
- Kote - Japanese bracers which were often made from plated mail sewn to cloth backing
- pl:Bechter moskiewski (Muscovy Mail-and-Plate) - Russian type of mail and plate armour
- Tatami-do - Japanese type of mail and plate armour
- Baju Lamina - Indonesian type of mail and plate armour
- de:Moro-Rüstung - Philippine type of mail and plate armour
- Mail (armour)
- Splinted armour
- Lamellar armour
