= Baju Lamina =

Type of mail and plate armour from Nusantara archipelago

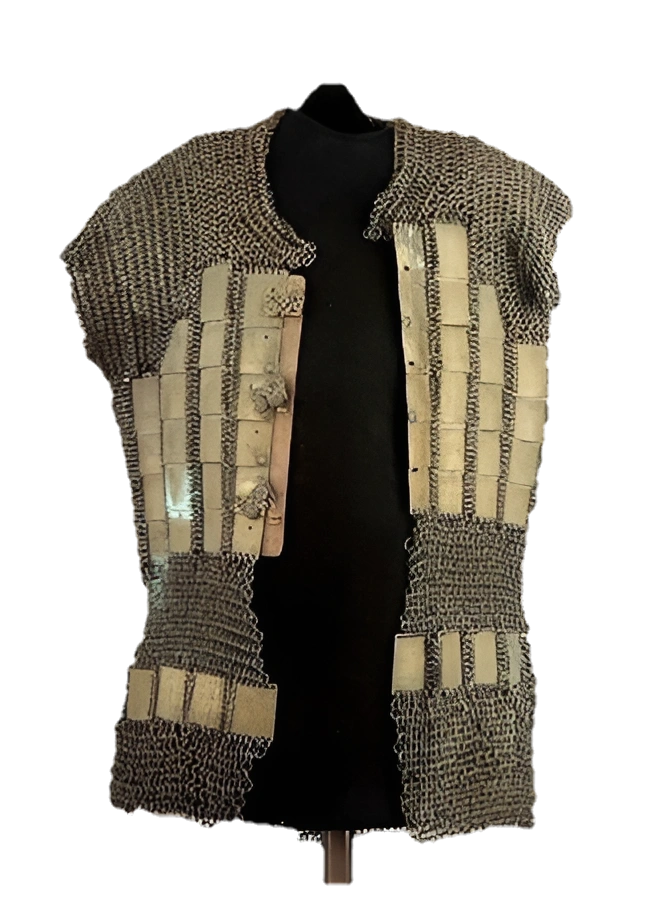
Traditional Bugis or Makassarese lamena armor.

The baju lamina (also known as lamena by Bugis, sa 'dan by Toraja, lamina or laminah by Malays) is a mail and plate armor from the Nusantara archipelago (Indonesia, Malaysia, Brunei, and Philippines).

== Description ==
The baju lamina is a chain armor that is worked in the form of a vest. The back portion consists of small rectangular brass plates, and the front part consists of brass rings. Several rectangular brass plates are attached to the brass rings, which extend from about the height of the collarbone to about the lower edge of the last rib cage. The brass plates serve to reinforce the chain armor at the level of the more vulnerable chest and pelvis. The baju lamina has neither sleeves nor a collar. One of the earliest references to this armor is after the conquest of Malacca by the Portuguese (1511). The son of Afonso de Albuquerque mentioned the armament of Malacca:

There are large matchlocks (Java arquebus), poisoned blowing tubes, bows, arrows, armor-plated dresses (laudeis de laminas), Javanese lances, and other sorts of weapons.

It is unknown whether Malaccan armor-plated dresses were used in battle, only used by the elites and nobilities, or if they were purely ceremonial dresses. Rui de Araújo reported that very few soldiers of the Malaccan army wore armor. Around the 17th century, the Bugis people started using mail and plate armor and they were still used until the 19th century.

== Gallery ==
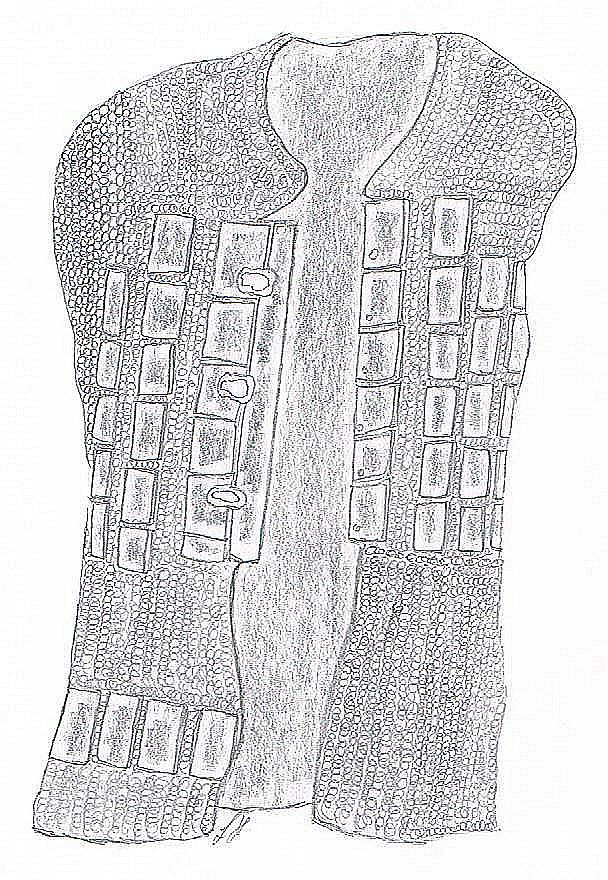
Sketch of a baju lamina

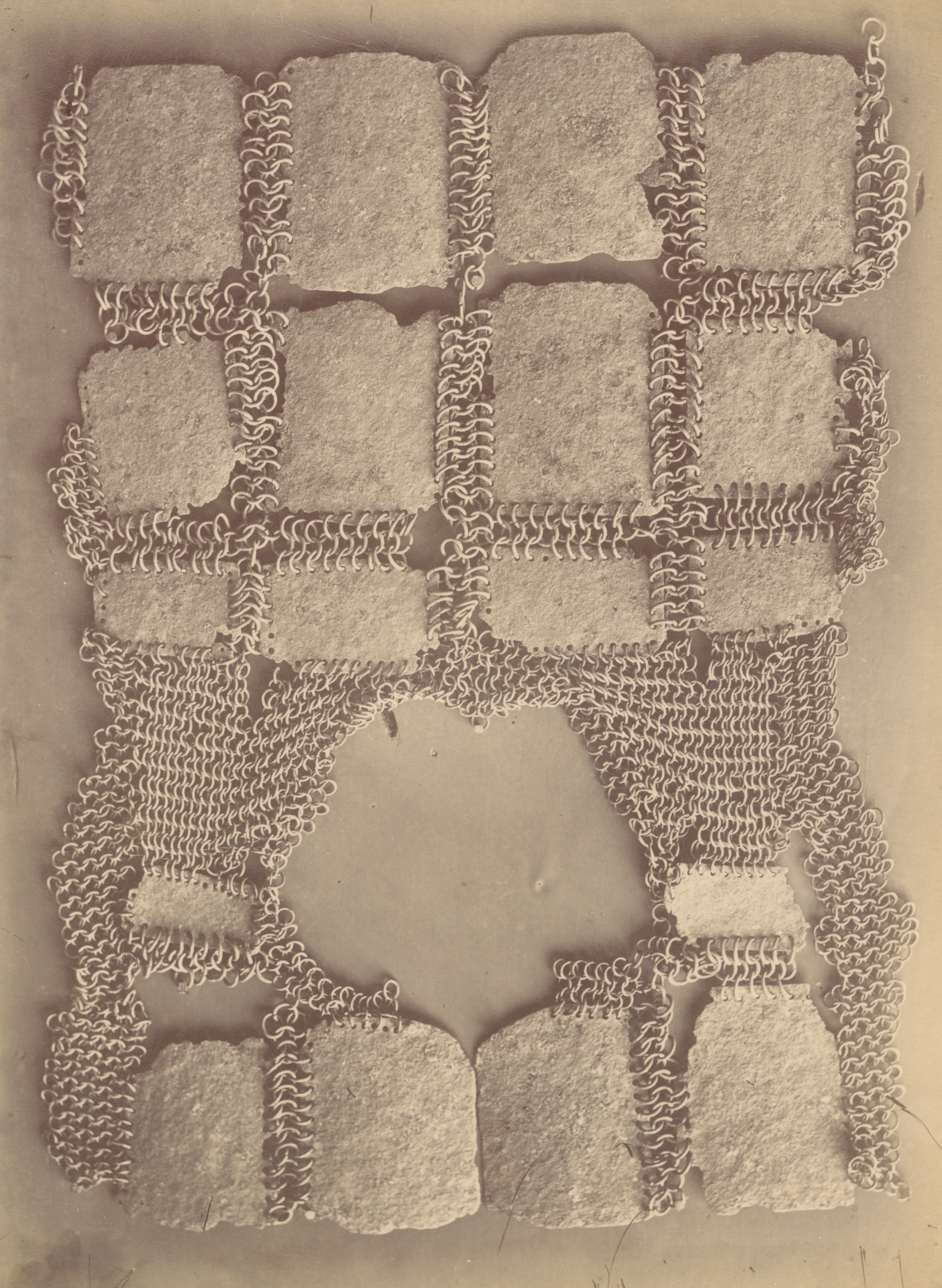
Armor at Telaga, Kuningan, West Java. Sundanese maille from the 13th to the 16th century AD.

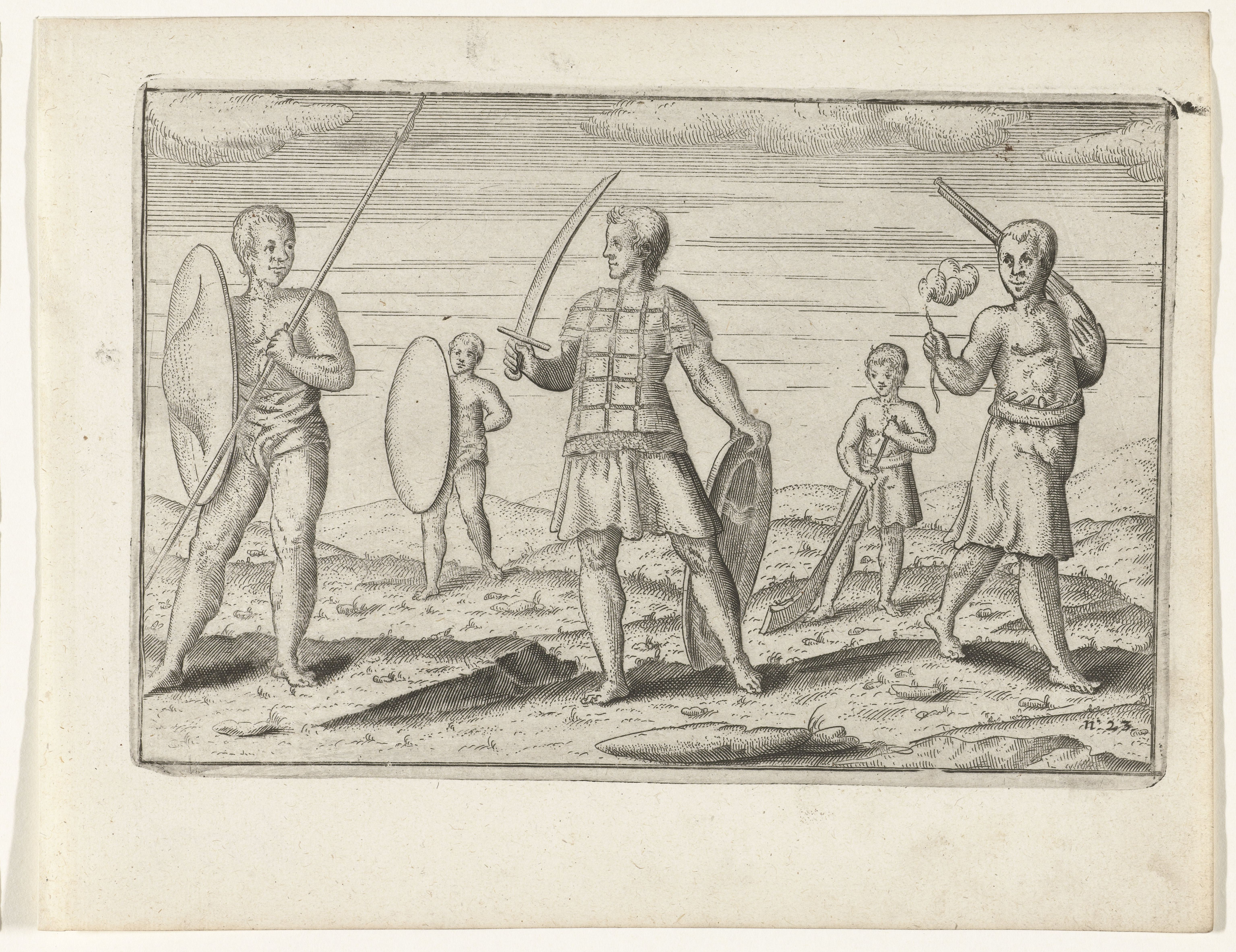
Warriors of Banten, 1596.

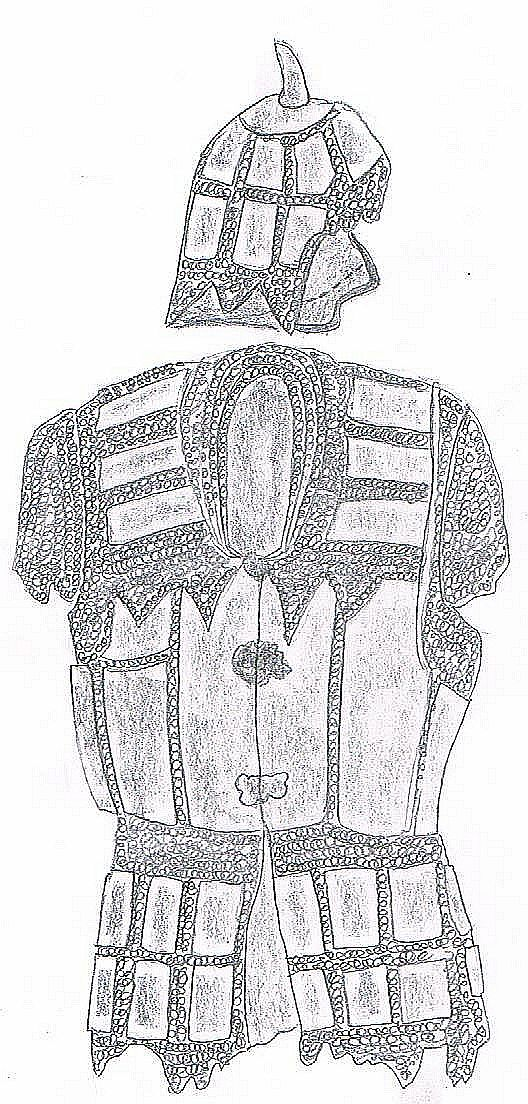
Baju lamina is similar to this Moro mail and plate armor (kurab-a-kulang).

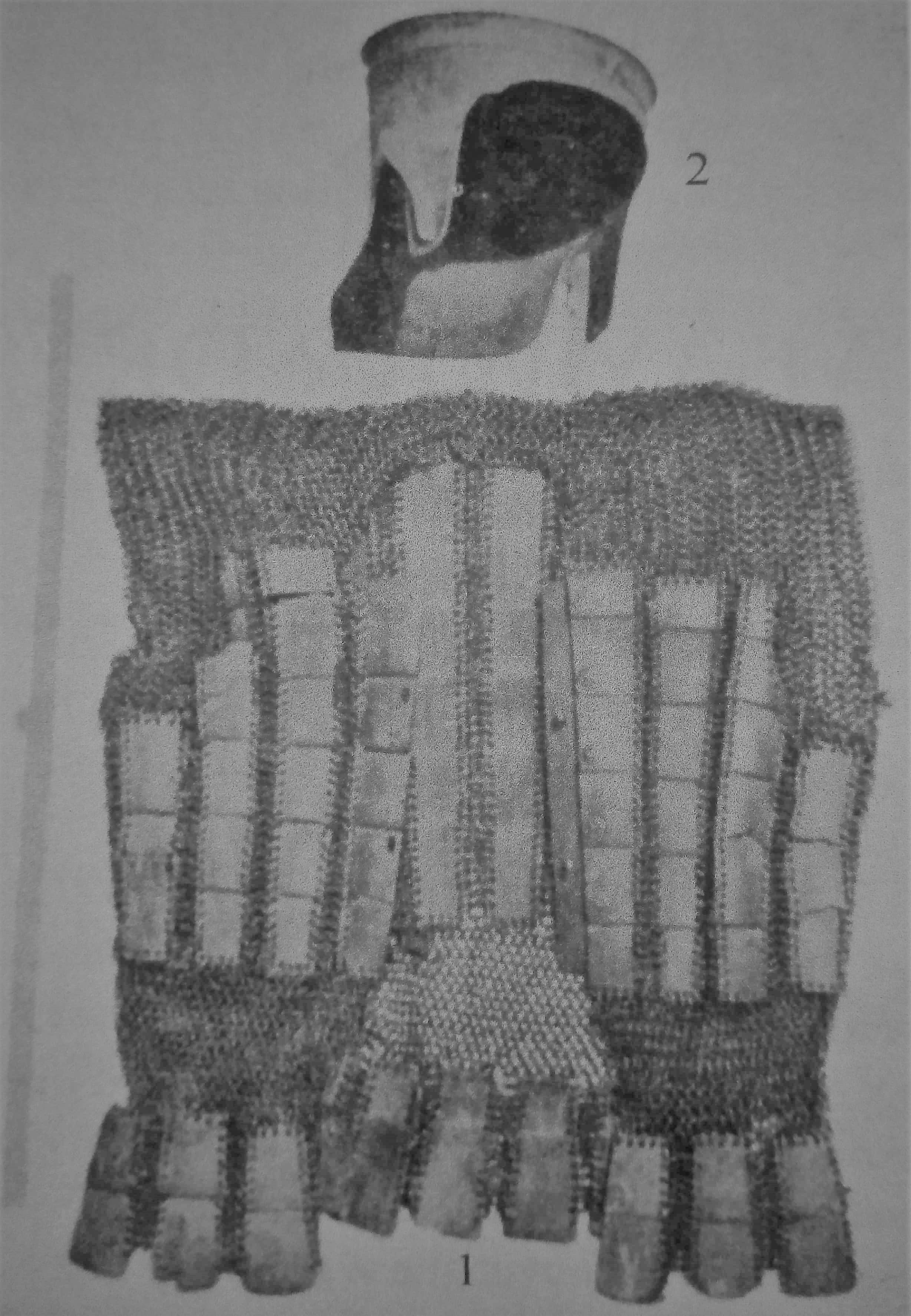
Malay baju lamina and kechubong helmet.

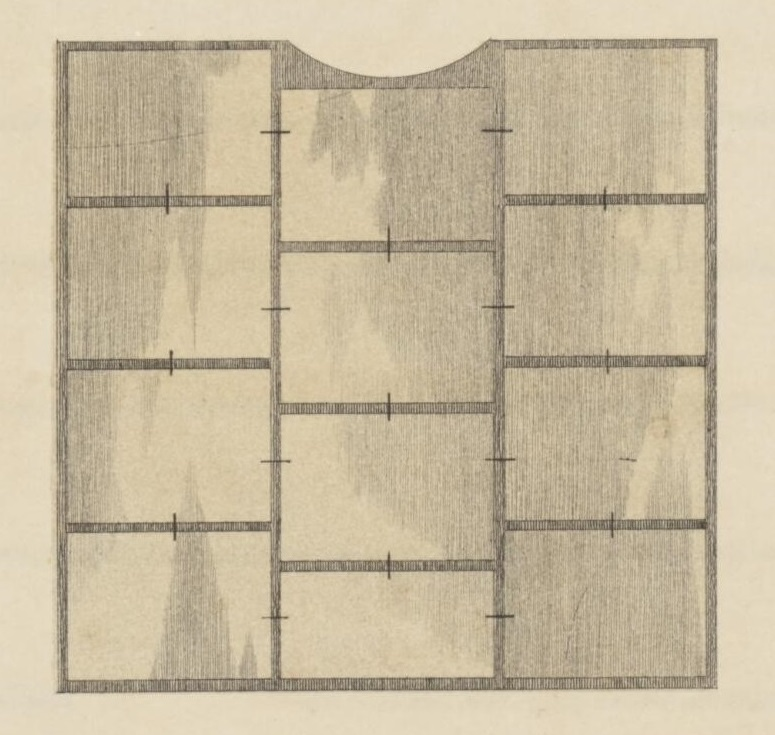
Bugis brass lamina, with large plates.

== See also ==
- Baju rantai
- Baju empurau
- Baru Öröba
- Baru Lema'a
- Chain mail
- Karambalangan
- Kawaca
- Siping-siping
