= Baju Empurau =

Traditional war jacket of Indonesia

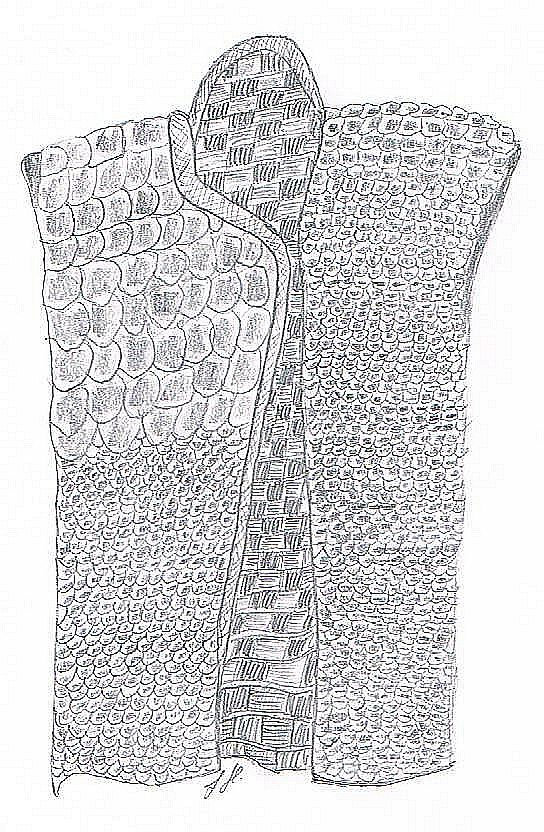
Sketch of Baju Empurau

The Baju Empurau (also known in English language as "war jacket") is an armour from Kalimantan, Indonesia.

== Description ==
The Baju Empurau is a kind of armor that is made of materials found in nature. It consists of fish scales and tree bark. The larger fish scales are attached to the lower vest with split rattan fibers, the smaller ones with a fixed string made from plant fibers. The lower vest consists of interwoven layers of tree bark. The vest has no sleeves, no collar and is provided with a semicircular shape in the neck area, which serves to protect the neck from blows. Its said this armor is meant to improve one’s vitality on the battlefield It is used by the Sea Dayak ethnic group.

== See also ==
- Baju lamina
- Baju rantai
- Baru Öröba
- Baru lema'a
- Karambalangan
- Kawaca
- Siping-siping
