= Kawaca =

Javanese term for war attire

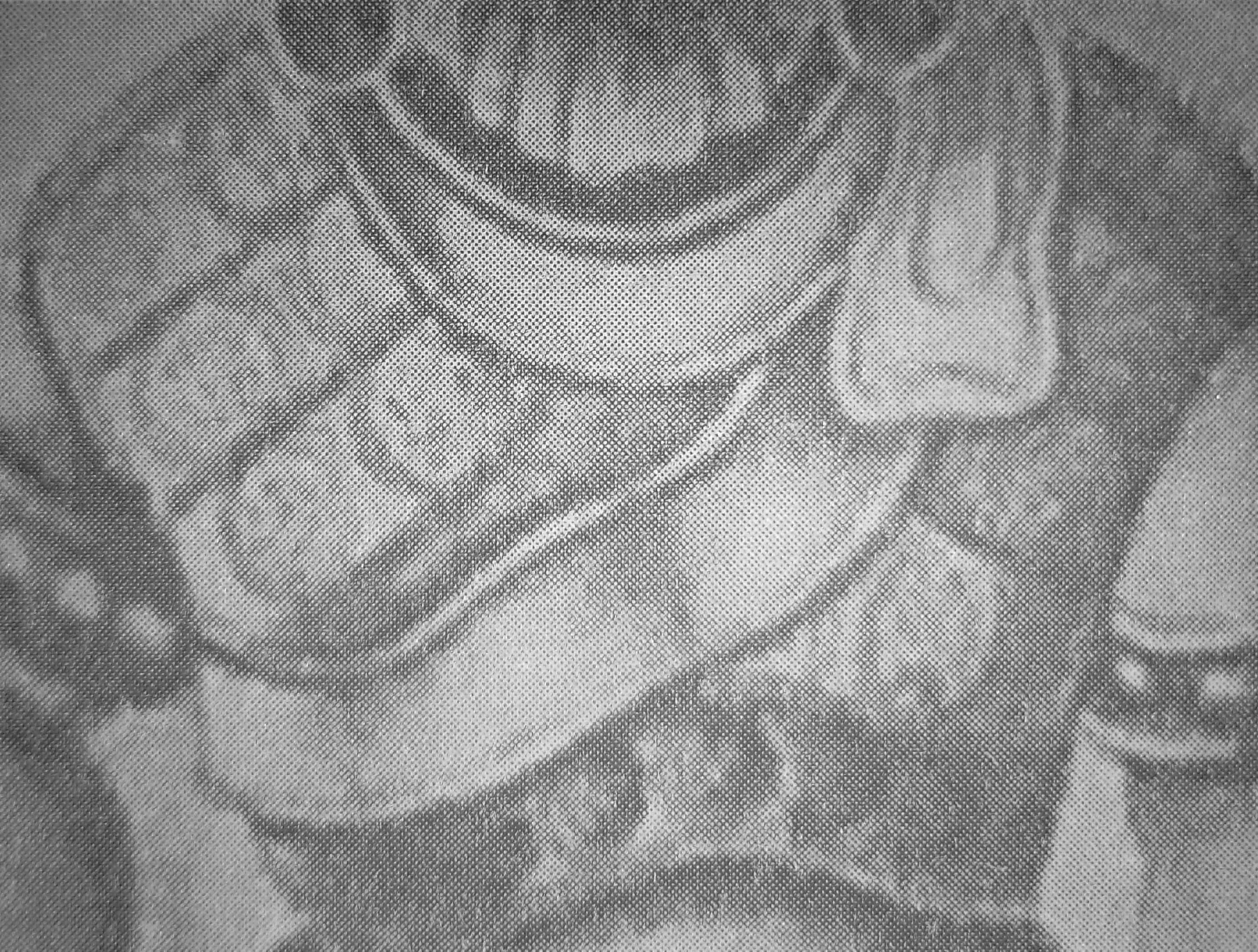
Close-up of a statue in Singhasari temple. According to I.D. Nugroho, this is an armor made of assembled plates.

Kawaca is a term for war attire mentioned in Old Javanese texts. Its name comes from the Sanskrit kawaca which means armor, cuirass, a type of chain mail, any kind of cover, corset, jacket.

== Description ==
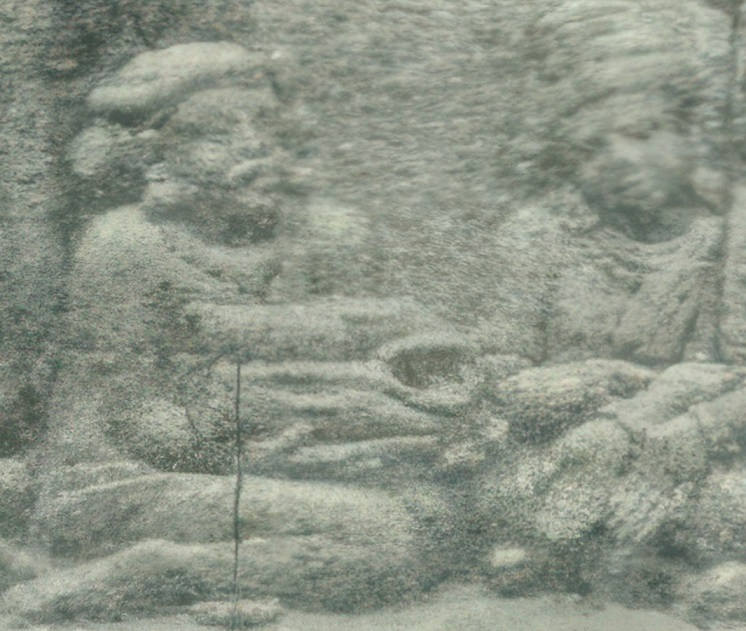
A cuirass being presented by a brahmin, depicted in the Borobudur temple.

Petrus Josephus Zoetmulder, in his Old Javanese-English dictionary, defines kawaca as a chain mail, possibly shaped like a jacket, which is made of metal. The word also has a second meaning, namely the shirt worn by the clergy. Irawan Djoko Nugroho argues that in a military context, kawaca means armor. It is shaped like a long tube and is made of cast copper. According to Jiří Jákl, kawaca was a metal breastplate worn on the upper body of a high-ranking soldier. In high Balinese language, kwaca or kuwaca is a general term for a jacket, although it used to mean armor in Old Javanese. In modern Javanese language, kawaca means cuirass or chain mail.

The Kakawin Ramayana (c. 870 AD), which is the Javanese version of Valmiki's epic Ramayana (c. 500 CE), mentions clothing and armor that reflect the era. A member of the royal family is said to wear crown, padaka (collar, medallion, or breastplate), karambalangan (girdle or plastron) and use gold-plated armor even in battle. Kakawin Ramayana also mentions the term watek makawaca, which means armored troops.

A suit of armor, or specifically cuirass, is depicted on the reliefs of the Divyavadana story in the Borobudur temple. In that story, it is said that Rudrayana sent a gift to king Bimbisara in the form of his famous cuirass which not only had miraculous powers but was also adorned with priceless gems. The cuirass is depicted as sleeveless and apparently closed in front.

== See also ==
- Baju rantai
- Baju lamina
- Baju empurau
- Baru Oroba
- Baru lema'a
- Siping-siping
- Karambalangan
