= Baru Lema'a =

Indonesian traditional armour

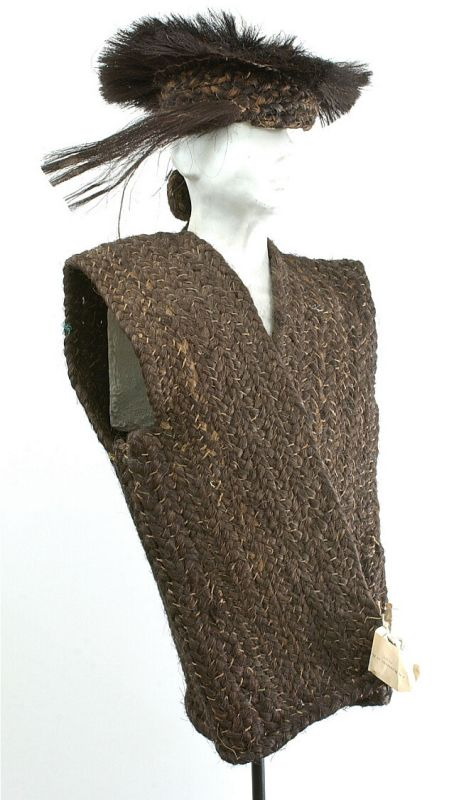
Baru lema'a on mannequin

The Baru Lema'a is a traditional armor from Indonesia.

== Description ==
The Baru Lema'a is made in the form of a vest. It consists of the braided, coarse fibers of the Iluk plant. The fibers are braided and the strands are connected again side by side. It has neither sleeves nor a collar. In the neck area a surface is protruding which is similar to two connected circles. This serves to protect the neck from blows. The vest is heavy and inflexible. It is used by ethnic groups from Indonesia.

== See also ==
- Baju lamina
- Baju empurau
- Baju rantai
- Baru Oroba
- Karambalangan
- Kawaca
- Siping-siping
