= Karambalangan =

Javanese body armor

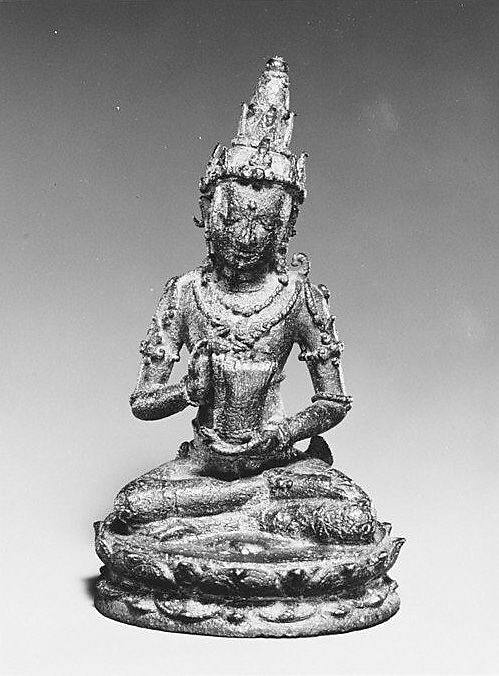
A cuirass being held by a deity, from 10–11th century Nganjuk, East Java.

Karambalangan is a type of personal armor from Java. It is a metal coating worn in front of the chest or breastplate.

== History ==
The Kakawin Ramayana (c. 870 AD), which is the Javanese version of Valmiki's epic Ramayana (c. 500 BC), mentions clothing and armor that reflect the era. A member of the royal family is said to wear crown, padaka (collar, medallion, or breastplate), karambalangan (girdle or plastron) and use gold-plated armor even in battle.

Karambalangan was recorded in the Kidung Panji Wijayakrama-Rangga Lawe (written as early as 1334 AD), which mentioned that Rangga Lawe wore karambalangan manik (jeweled karambalangan) when he rebelled against Majapahit (1295 AD). Emperor Raden Wijaya in that kidung was recorded using golden karambalangan manik.

In the Kidung Sundayana, it is written that Gajah Mada before the Bubat tragedy wore a karambalangan (a metal plate on the front of the chest—breastplate) decorated with gold emboss, armed with a gold-plated spear, and a shield decorated with diamonds.

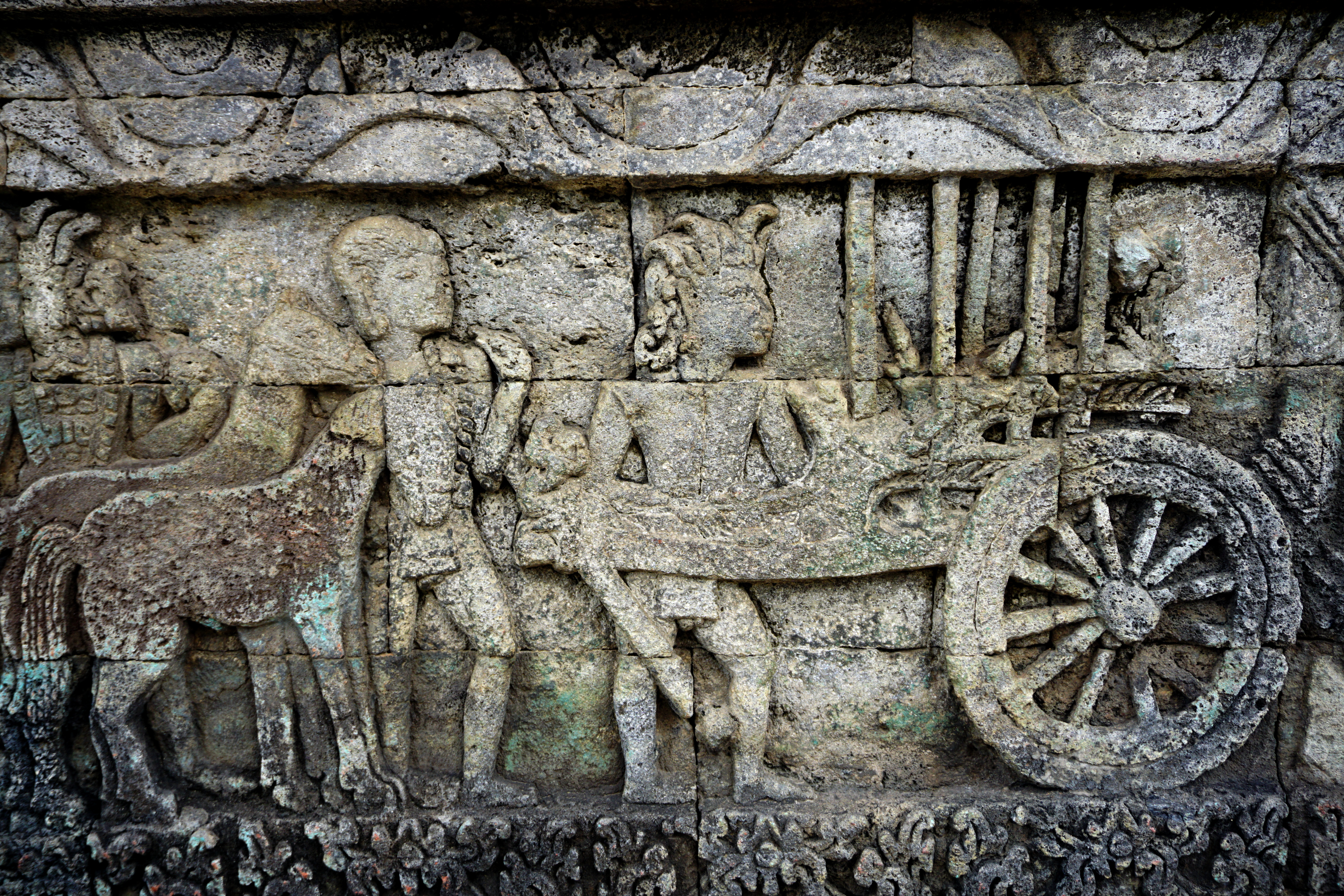
In the main temple of Candi Penataran temple complex, 1269 saka or 1347 AD.

== See also ==
- Baju rantai
- Baju lamina
- Baju empurau
- Baru Oroba
- Baru lema'a
- Siping-siping
- Kawaca
