= Siping-siping =

Scale armor from Java

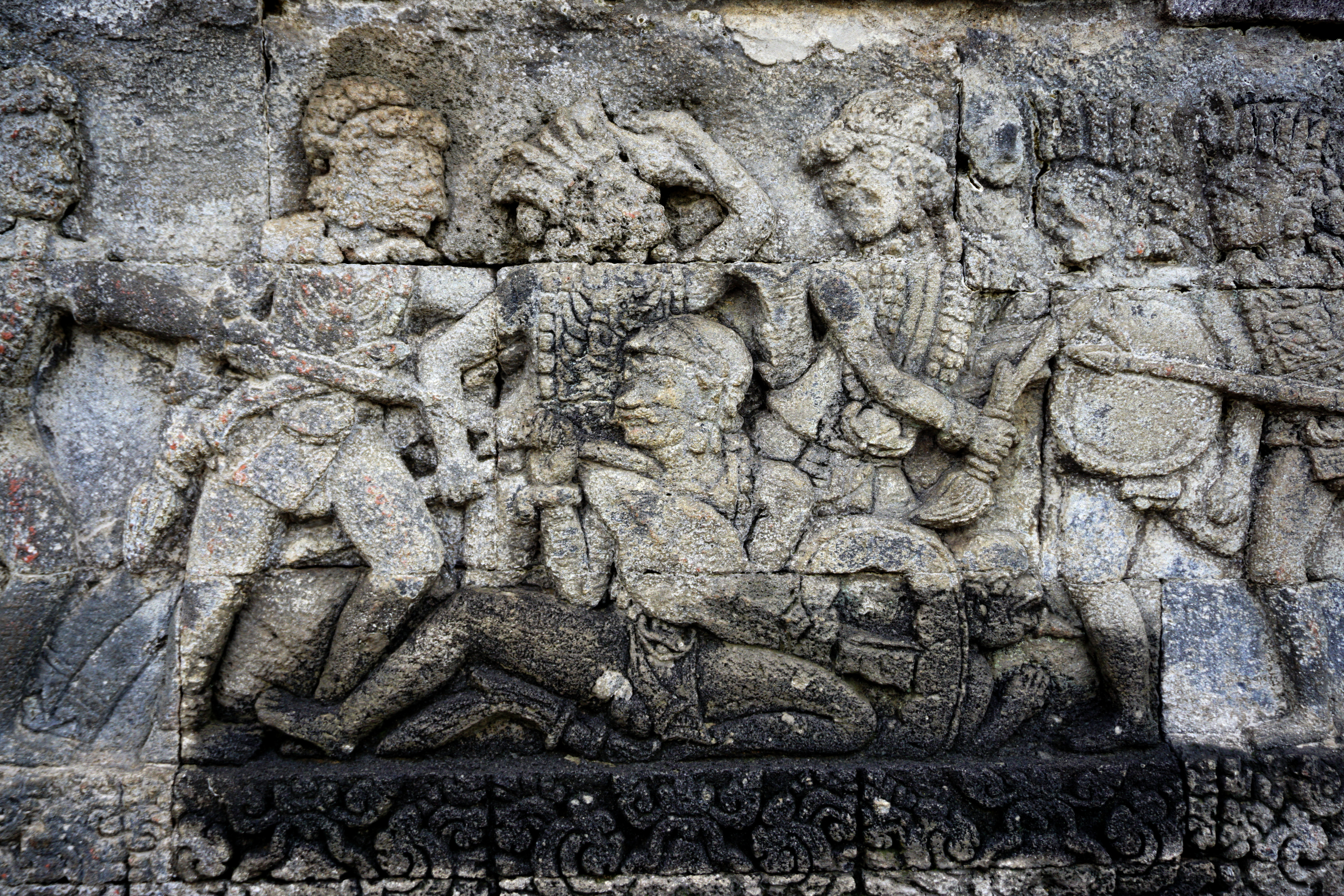
Battle relief from the main temple at Penataran temple complex, featuring scale-armored warriors, 1269 saka or 1347 AD.

Siping-siping, simping-simping, or sisimping, is a type of armor used in Java. It is a short sleeveless jacket made of scale-shaped metal plates.

== Description ==
Unlike the kawaca which was only worn by high-ranking warriors, this battle outfit was mostly worn by infantry soldiers. It is usually defined as scale armor, Suryo Supomo interprets it as a metal plated jacket. Those who proved themselves in battle mentioned in the Nawanatya (a court etiquette manual composed in the 14th century) had jackets "decorated with shell discs". Several Javanese text indicated that some are made of brass.

Due to the lack of surviving metal armor remains in the Javanese military, Jiří Jákl suggests that the siping-siping may have been made of buffalo hide reinforced with metal parts. Another possibility is that it was made from buffalo hide and reinforced with small discs of shells called siping-siping.

At first the word siping-siping referred to a type of shellfish and its shell. It first appeared in the Kadiri (1042–1222) texts. In Modern Javanese, the word simping still refers to a kind of oyster shell. According to the Great Indonesian Dictionary, simping is "a scallop whose shell is round, flat and thin, one shell is red and more convex than the other shell which is white" or Amusium pleuronectes.

The Pitt River Museum has a Javanese scale armor made of horns. It is sleeveless and designed to resemble pangolin scales.

At the time of the Bubat tragedy (1357), it was noted that the Sundanese elite troops under the command of the patih Anepaken wore armor (sisimping or siping-siping). As written in the Kidung Sunda:

Jajakanirabagus kadi ring surat, saha watang jininjring, asisimping emas, alancingan bot sabrang, pantes olahe prajurit, wangsya amenak, tus ning Sunda sinaring.

His guards were handsome, just like in the picture; they had spears of jring wood, wore gold-worked armor (sisimping) and trousers (lancingan) of fine manufacture. They know how to show themselves as noble warriors from a good family, the flower of Sundanese youth.

Likewise the Majapahit party in the Kidung Sunda, Javanese soldiers are recorded as using golden siping-siping.

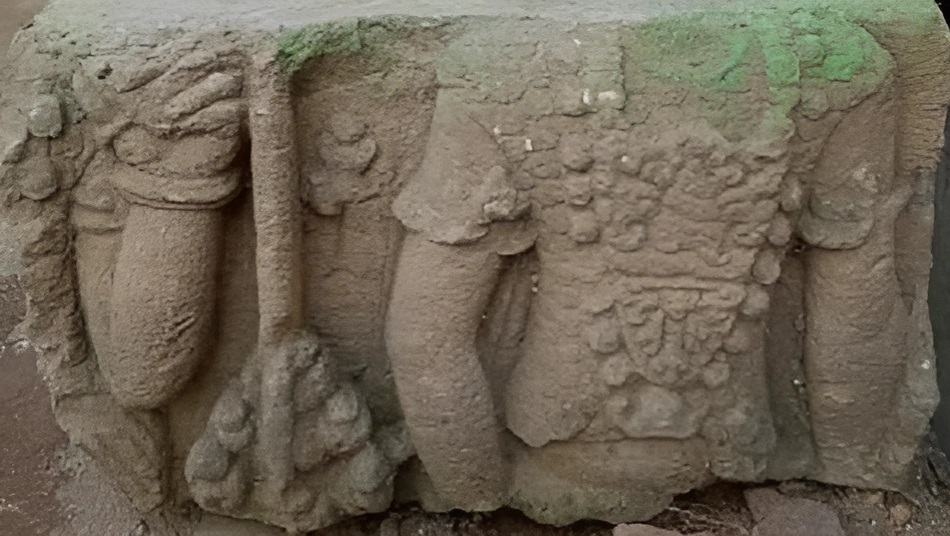
A relief showing scale armor, probably from Penataran temple complex

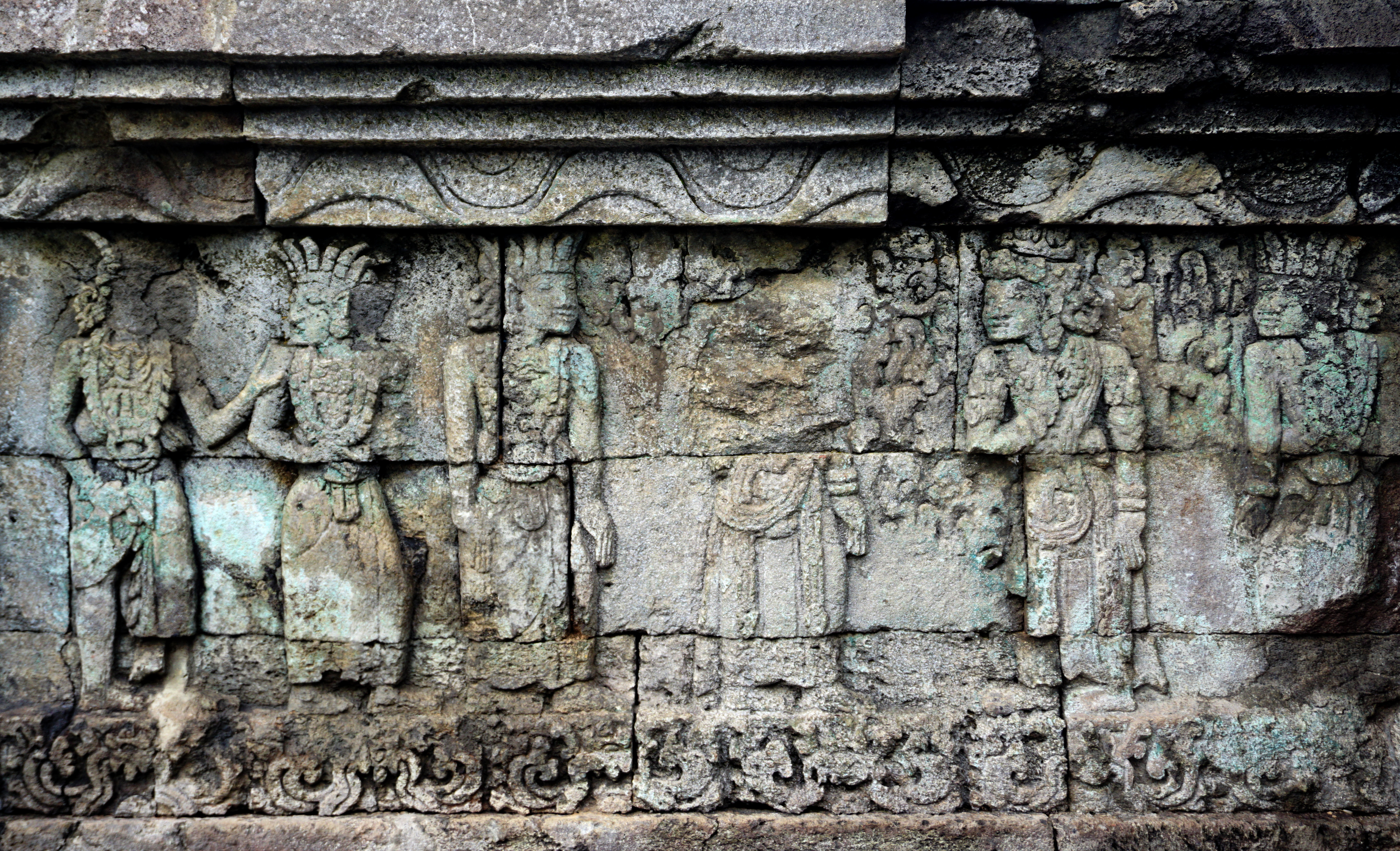
Reliefs at the Penataran temple complex.

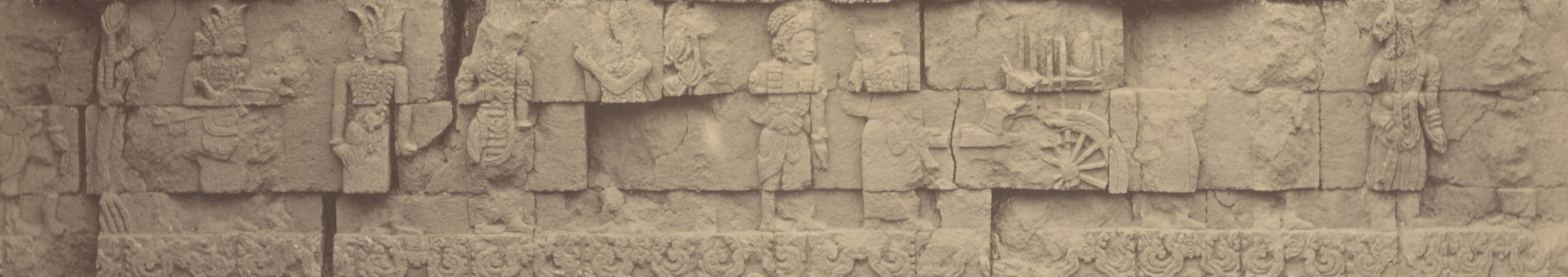
Worn-out reliefs in Candi Penataran, showing an armored horse rider, armored warriors, and a chariot.

== See also ==
- Baju rantai
- Baju lamina
- Baju empurau
- Baru Oroba
- Baru lema'a
- Karambalangan
- Kawaca
