= Baju Rantai =

Southeast Asian chainmail armor

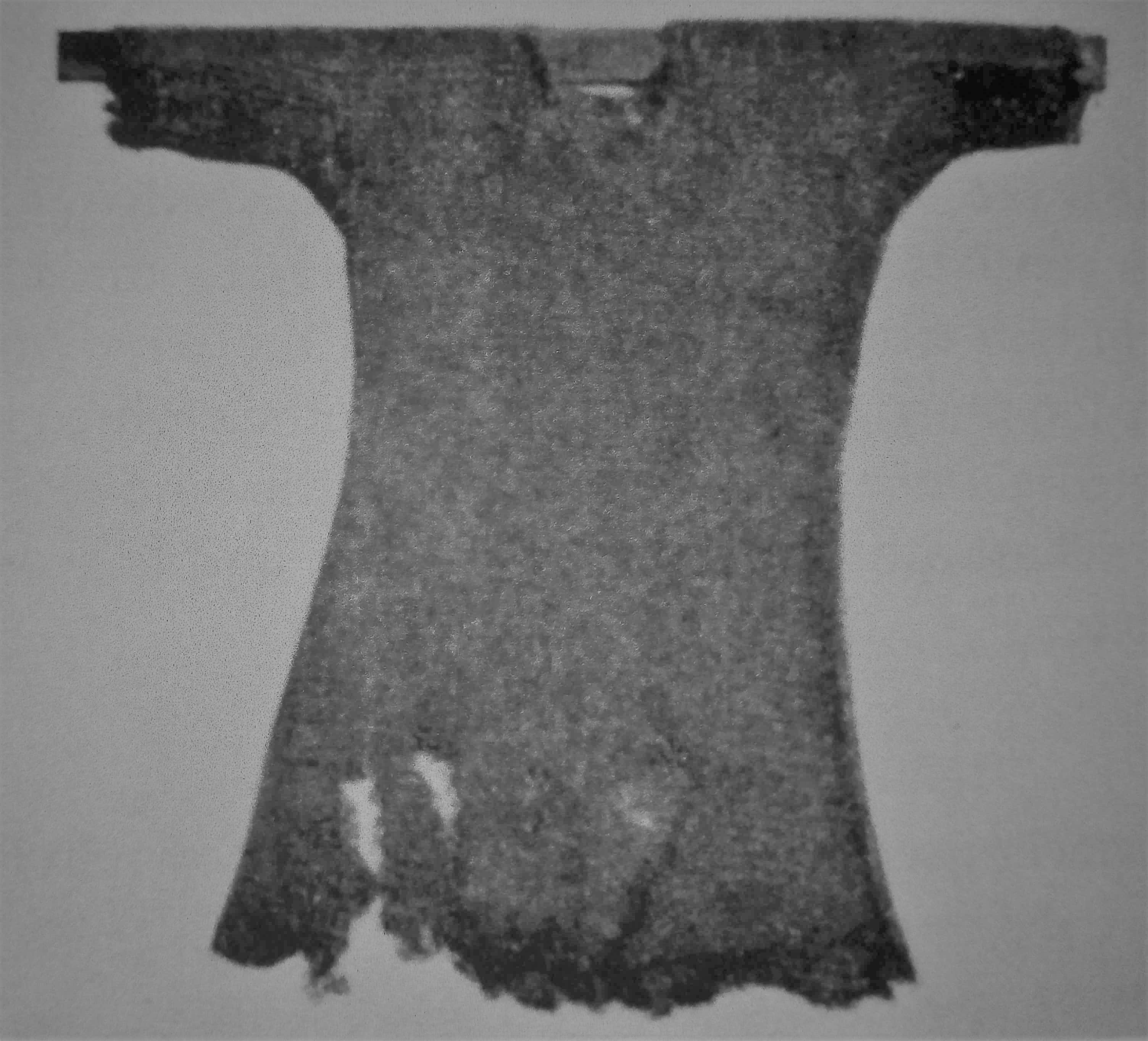
A baju rantai or baju besi.

The baju rantai (Note: also known as badjoe-rante, baju besi, baju rante, wadjoe-rante, and waju rante) is a type of chain armor found in islands of Southeast Asia (including Indonesia, Malaysia, Brunei, and the Philippines) that is worked from small iron rings into the form of a shirt. It has no collar and sleeves that reach about to the elbow. The lower end is approximately at the height of the thighs.

== Etymology ==
The name originates from old Javanese words, baju comes from waju meaning jacket, clothing or apparel, meanwhile rantai comes from rante, rantay, or ranti which mean chain, string, or wreath.

== History ==
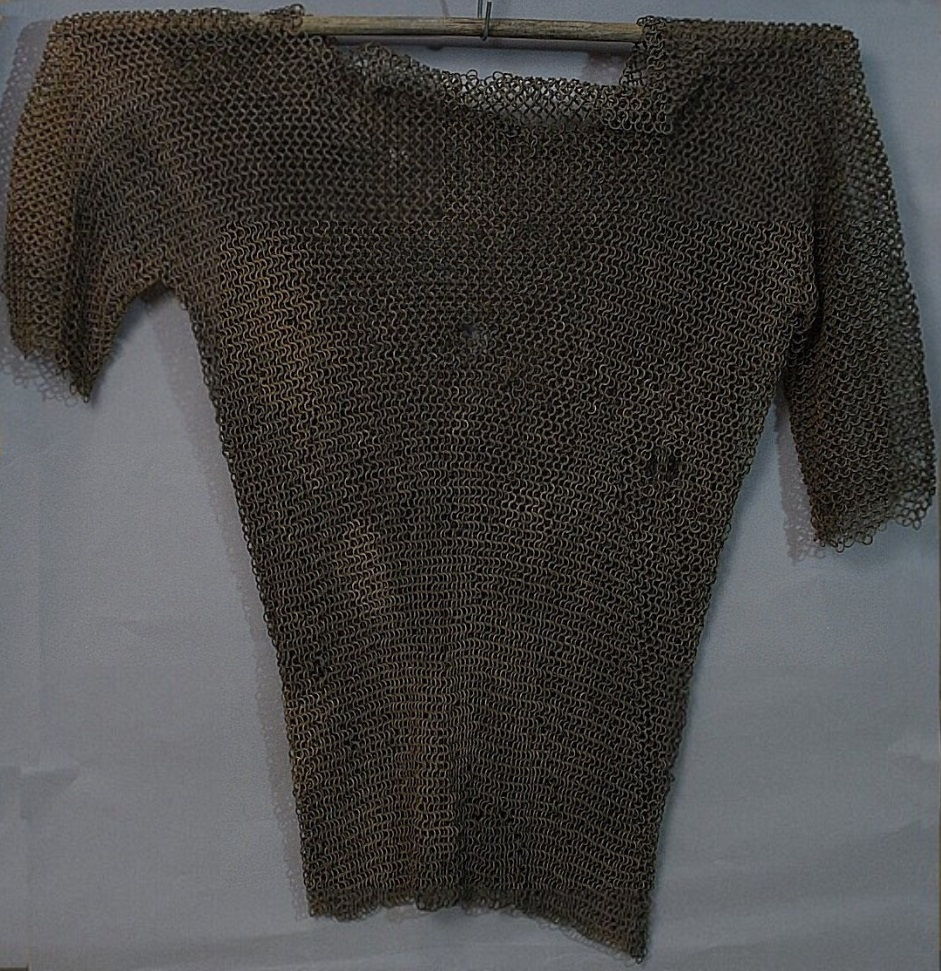
A baju rantai from Southern Sulawesi.

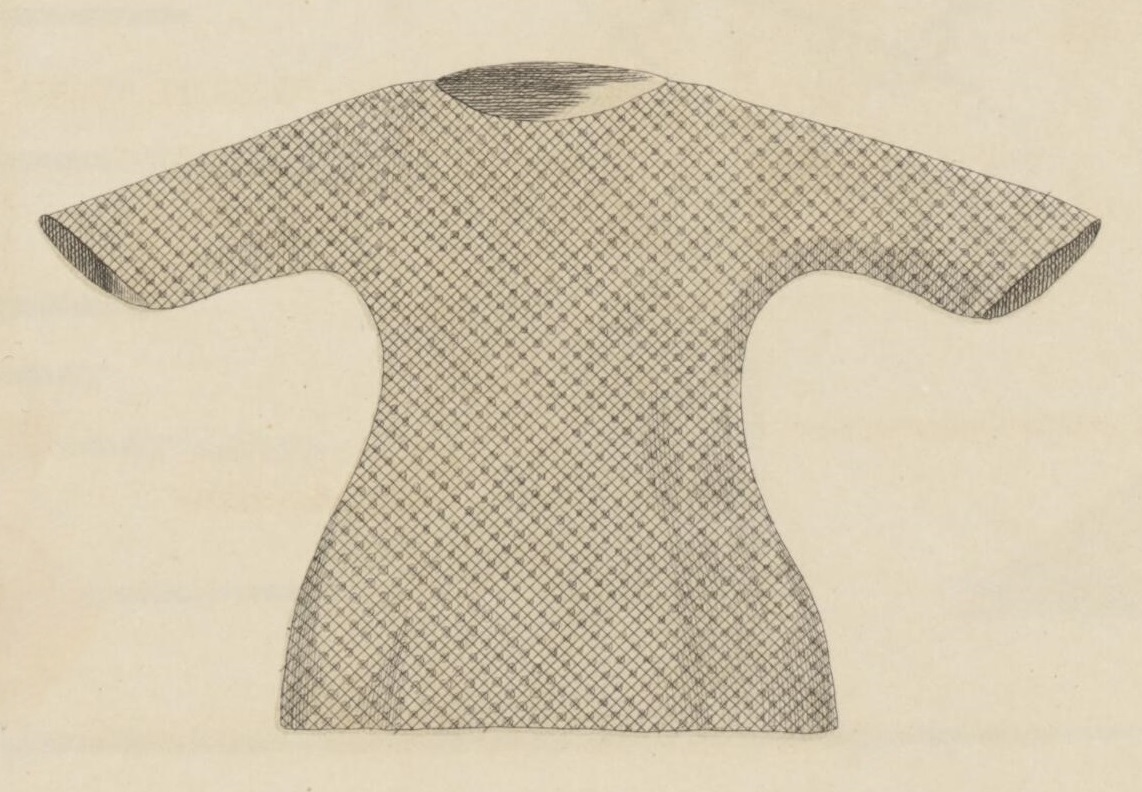
A bugis chainmail armor.

One of the earliest mentions of this armour is in the Tamblingan Pura Endek I Lempeng Besar I inscription from Bali dated the year 844 Saka (922 AD) recording the existence of armour makers in the island, saying:

...thani anteken ya parmasan ulih juru pande, apan khu tumkap baju besi.
...they are not subject to parmasan fees by the master smiths (juru pande) because they make armor (baju besi).

The Kidung Panji Wijayakrama-Rangga Lawe, a javanese kidung text that tells about the rebellion of Rangga Lawe against Majapahit in 1295 A.D. mentioned waju rante, which means apparel consisting of iron chains. Petrus Josephus Zoetmulder, a scholar of Old Javanese, noted the use of special apparel for soldiers with the phrase bala winaju gangsa ranti or "soldiers dressed in bronze chains" (gangsa ranti). (Note: gangsa refers to a kind of copper and lead alloy, while ranti means "chain".)

The Hikayat Banjar noted the Bhayangkara equipments in the Majapahit palace, which includes:

Maka kaluar dangan parhiasannya orang barbaju-rantai ampat puluh sarta padangnya barkupiah taranggos sakhlat merah, orang mambawa astenggar ampat puluh, orang mambawa parisai sarta padangnya ampat puluh, orang mambawa dadap sarta sodoknya sapuluh, orang mambawa panah sarta anaknya sapuluh, yang mambawa tumbak parampukan barsulam amas ampat puluh, yang mambawa tameng Bali bartulis air mas ampat puluh.
So came out with their ornaments men with chain mail numbered forty alongside their swords and red kopiah [skull cap], men carrying astengger [arquebus] numbered forty, men carrying shields and swords numbered forty, men carrying dadap [a type of long parrying shield] (Note: Dadap in Java seems to refer to a long shield which is quite heavy, probably with protruding ends.) and sodok (Note: broad-bladed spear-like weapon) numbered ten, men carrying bows and arrows numbered ten, (men) who carried gold-embroidered tiger spears (Note: pikes or lances used in the blood sport of spearing tigers (rampokan macan).) numbered forty, (men) who carried Balinese shields with golden water engraving numbered forty.
— Hikayat Banjar, 6.3

Two related ethnic communities of South Sulawesi, the Bugis and Makassarese, also adopted chain mail armor which they call as waju rante or waju ronte. The armor is made by string of iron rings tied together, which makes it similar to knitwork. The Bugis and Makassarese soldiers were known for using chain mail and muskets which they made themselves.

In the 17th century, Javanese cavalry is commonly equipped with chain mail armor, for example in 1678 Captain Tack met 240 horsemen who all wore armor, who were lancers with chainmail. Trunajaya cavalry was composed of about 150 men armed with lances and most of them wore chain mails. Bantenese royal vessels are noted to have rowers wearing chain mail.

== See also ==
- Baju lamina
- Baju empurau
- Baru Öröba
- Baru Lema'a
- Karambalangan
- Kawaca
- Siping-siping
